= Dean Street station =

Former New York City Subway station in Brooklyn

Dean Street
- Former New York City Subway station
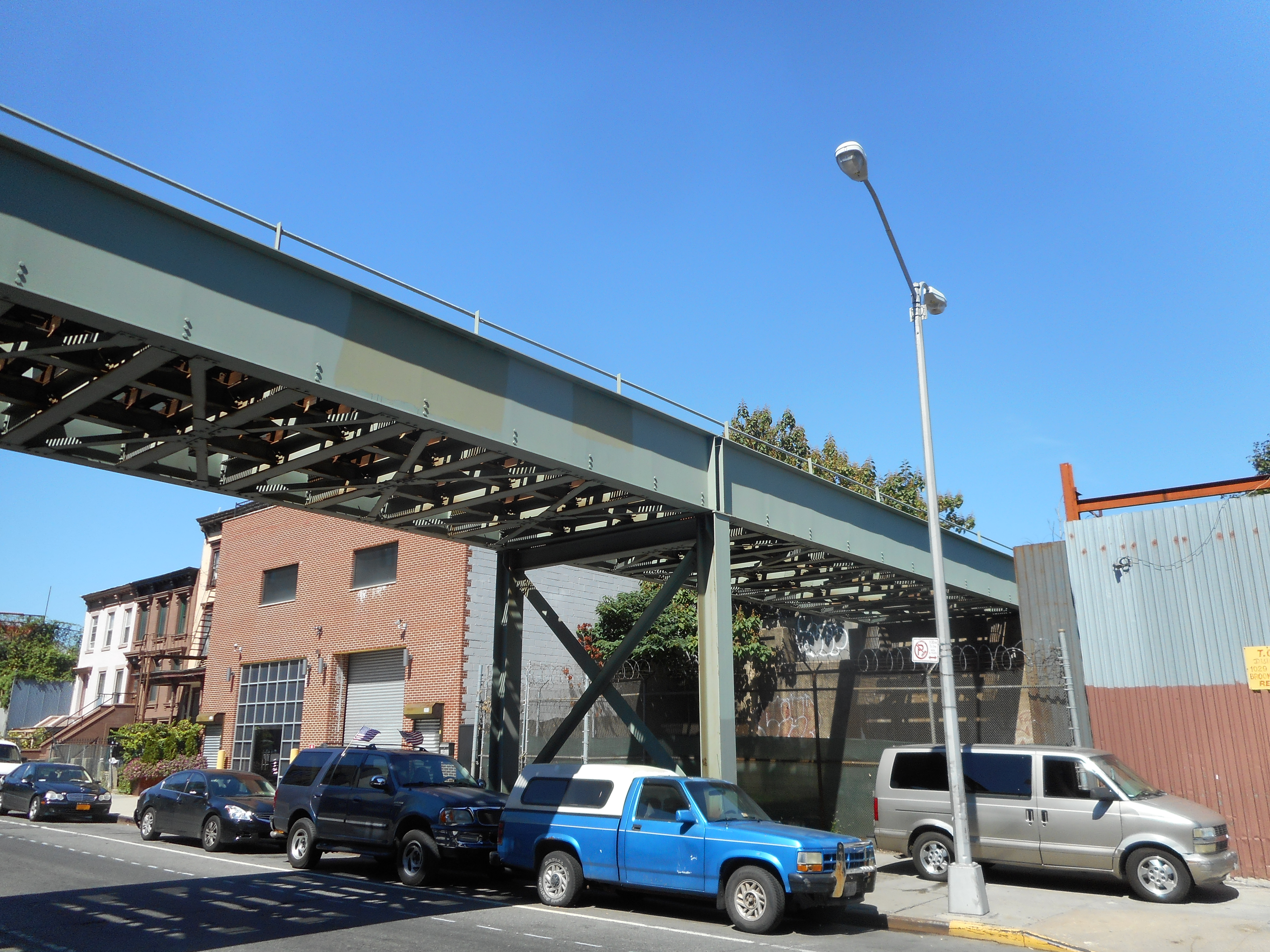
- Looking at the northeast corner of the bridge over Dean Street where the former BMT Franklin Avenue Line station was located. The shorter lamp is the only evidence of the Dean Street station's existence.

Station statistics
- Address: Dean Street and Franklin Avenue; Brooklyn, New York
- Borough: Brooklyn
- Locale: Crown Heights
- Coordinates: 40.6778°N 73.9565°W
- Division: B (BMT)
- Line: BMT Franklin Avenue Line
- Services: None (demolished)
- Structure: Elevated
- Platforms: 2 side platforms
- Tracks: 2 while open, 1 at location today

Other information
- Opened: Initial: August 15, 1896; 129 years ago Reopening: October 28, 1901; 124 years ago
- Closed: First closing: c. 1899; Final closing: September 10, 1995; 30 years ago
- Former/other names: Bergen Street

Station succession
- Next north: Franklin Avenue
- Next south: Park Place
Location

Street map

The Dean Street station was a New York City Subway station on the BMT Franklin Avenue Line. Located on Dean Street west of Franklin Avenue in the Crown Heights neighborhood of Brooklyn, it was serviced by the Franklin Avenue Shuttle. The Dean Street station opened and closed twice in its history, though the line it served continues in operation.

== History ==
The Kings County Elevated Railway was connected to the Brighton Beach Line in 1896 by means of a ramp and short elevated line from a point south of the latter railroad's terminal at Atlantic and Franklin Avenues in Brooklyn. The local property owners were promised a station on the elevated structure near the old Bedford Terminal, and one was established by 1897 at Dean Street, nearly adjacent to the former terminal, which was closed. The station was not well patronized and the elevated company closed it c. 1899. An uproar ensued, including appeals to the State Railroad Commission. By November 1899, one John Costello of Brooklyn had filed a complaint with the New York State Board of Railroad Commissioners. On October 28, 1901, Dean Street was opened for the second time. The station continued to be poorly patronized, as it was only a few hundred feet from the Franklin Avenue station, which was located at the busy intersection of Fulton Street and Franklin Avenue. Nevertheless, Dean Street was upgraded to handle six-car subway trains with the rest of the Franklin Avenue Line in 1924.

Through the 1970s and 1980s, the Dean Street station deteriorated, along with other stations on the line. In 1985, the station had only 133 paying daily riders (i.e., not counting farebeaters) on a typical weekday, making it one of the least used stations in the system. In 1995, the New York City Transit Authority closed the station permanently as part of service cuts. The TA cited low patronage (the lowest on the subway system), its decrepit condition, and its close proximity to Franklin Avenue station. At the time of its closing, Dean Street and Franklin Avenue were the two closest stations on the system, located just three blocks from each other at their closest points. It was charged that many who used Dean Street station jumped over the turnstiles, a major problem at the time, lowering the passenger count even further.

== Remnants ==
The line that once served the Dean Street station, the BMT Franklin Avenue Line, still operates as the Franklin Avenue Shuttle. The elevated portion of the line was completely rebuilt in the late 1990s, reopening in 1999. Nothing visible remains of the former station, except for an oddly placed lamppost at street level.
