= Park Place station (BMT Franklin Avenue Line) =

New York City Subway station in Brooklyn

Park Place
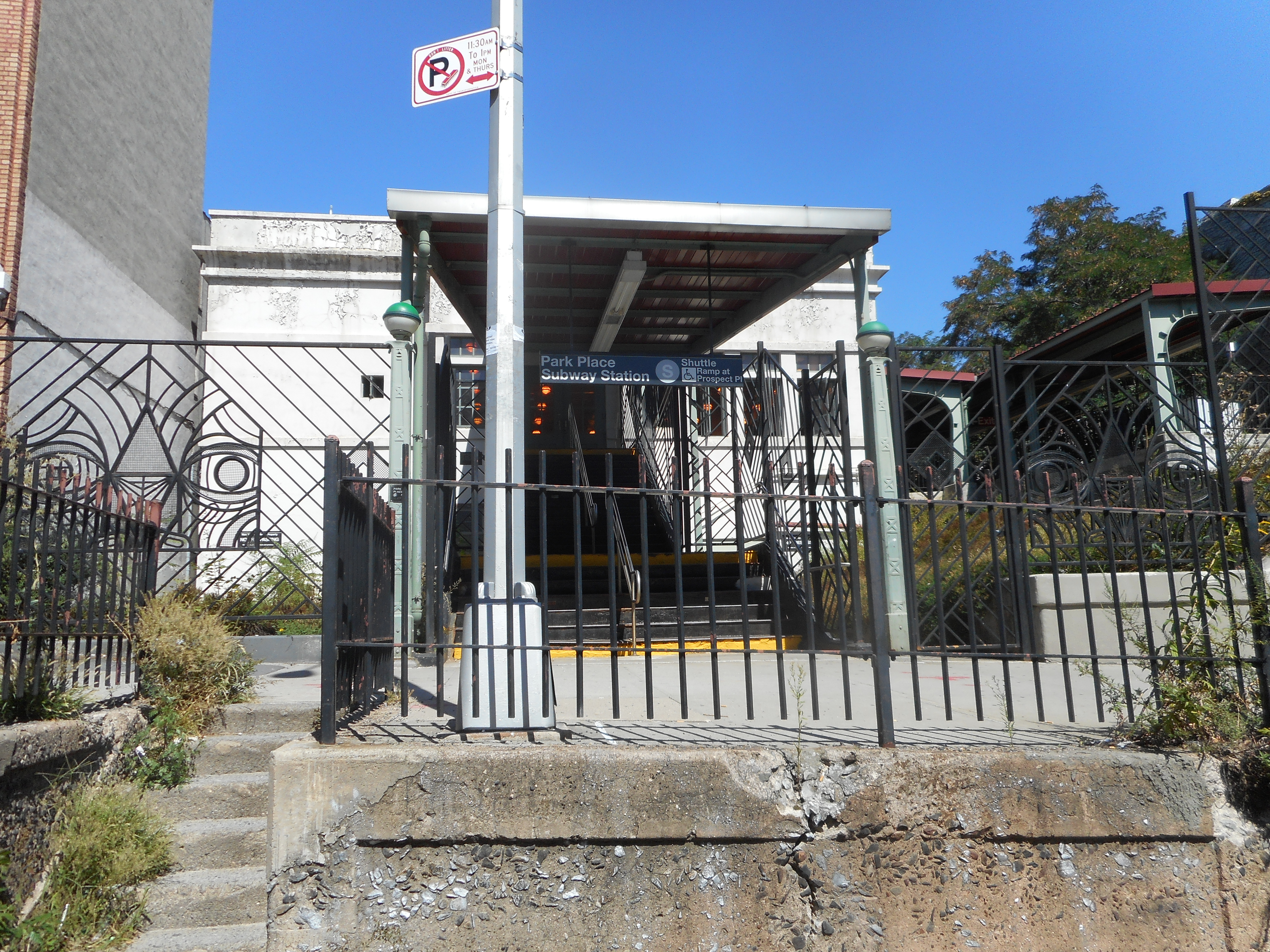
- Station entrance from Park Place

Station statistics
- Address: Park Place & Franklin Avenue; Brooklyn, New York
- Borough: Brooklyn
- Locale: Crown Heights
- Coordinates: 40.674357°N 73.957858°W
- Division: B (BMT)
- Line: BMT Franklin Avenue Line; BMT Brighton Line (Until 1920)
- Services: S (all times)
- Transit: NYCT Bus: B45, B48, B49, B65
- Structure: Embankment
- Platforms: 1 side platform
- Tracks: 1

Other information
- Opened: June 19, 1899
- Rebuilt: April 4, 1905; 121 years ago (elevated railway); October 18, 1999; 27 years ago (shuttle refurbishment)
- Accessible: Yes
- Former/other names: Butler Street; Sterling Place

Traffic
- 2025: 417,490 ▲15.8%
- Rank: 403 out of 423
Services
Preceding station	New York City Subway	Following station
Franklin Avenue Terminus	Franklin Avenue	Botanic Garden toward Prospect Park
Non-revenue services and lines
Preceding station	New York City Subway	Following station
Dean Street demolished	no service	
Location
Location within New York City Subway
Location within New York City
Location within New York
Track layout
Street map
Station service legend
Symbol	Description
Stops all times	Stops all times

The Park Place station is a station on the BMT Franklin Avenue Line of the New York City Subway in Crown Heights, Brooklyn. Served by the Franklin Avenue Shuttle at all times, it is the only solitary station in the subway system to be served solely by a shuttle service without any connections to non-shuttle services. It is also the only single-track station in the subway system that is not a terminal station.

== History ==
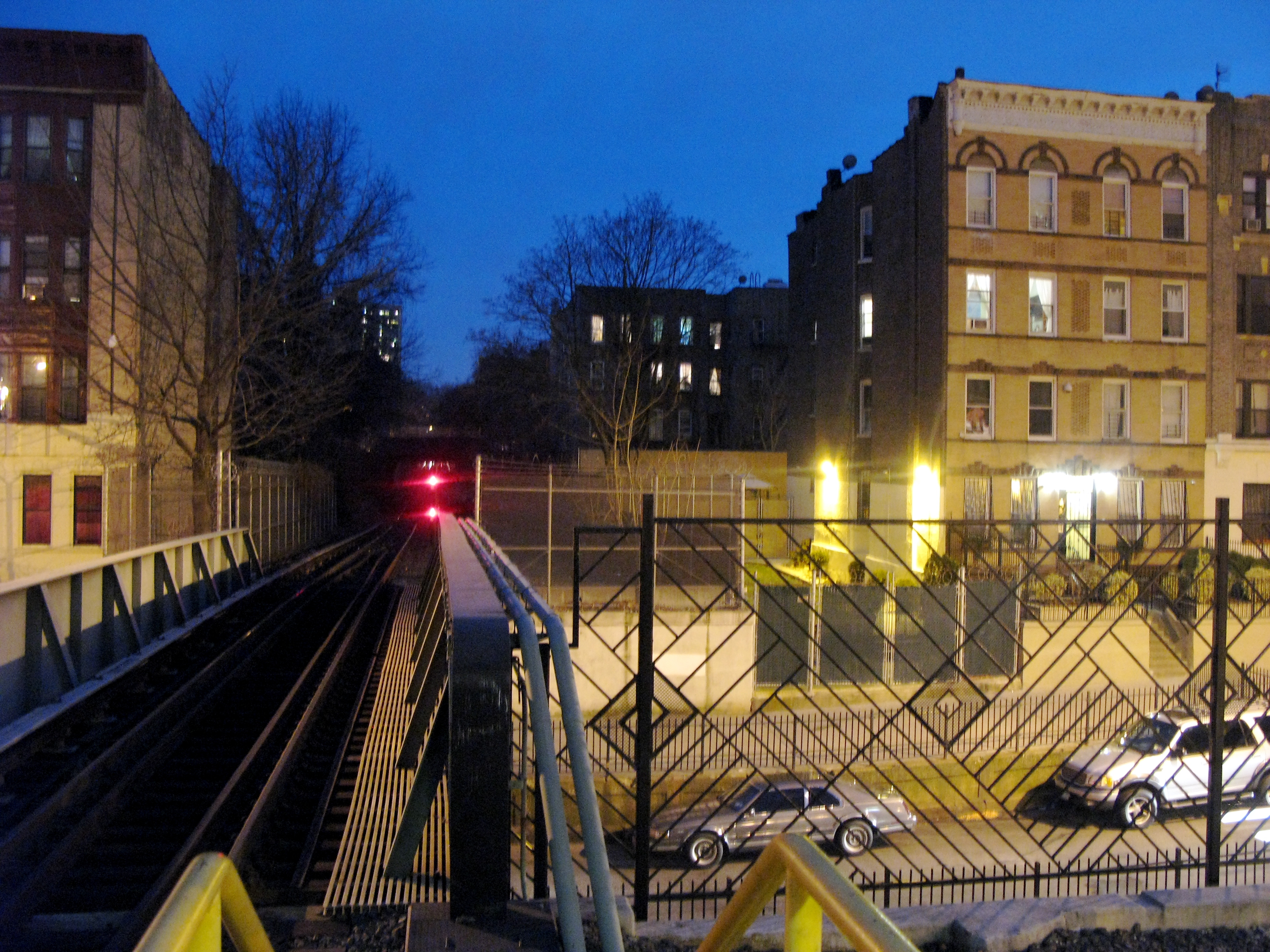
View from the station, with the Arts for Transit installation on the railings

The station is located at the point where the tracks of the original Brooklyn, Flatbush & Coney Island Railway left the street surface and began running in an open-cut right-of-way on its route to Brighton Beach and Coney Island. The Kings County Elevated Railway (KCER) had begun serving the line in 1896.

A station was established at this spot on June 19, 1899, to provide local residents access to KCER trains. This station consisted of two simple compacted earth platforms at the side of each track running south of Park Place.

During 1905–1906, this portion of the line was rebuilt as a raised elevated railway and embankment structure, and a new station was built at this location, with a single floor-level island platform and a station house between the tracks. The new station was located with the station house over Park Place and the platform extending north from that point.

In April 1993, the New York State Legislature agreed to give the MTA $9.6 billion for capital improvements. Some of the funds would be used to renovate nearly one hundred New York City Subway stations, including Park Place. The station had deteriorated over the years as the New York City Transit Authority considered whether to abandon or rehabilitate the station and the line. Community support in the Bedford–Stuyvesant and Crown Heights communities persuaded the city to rebuild the line. The station closed in 1998, was completely rebuilt, and reopened in 1999.

== Station layout ==
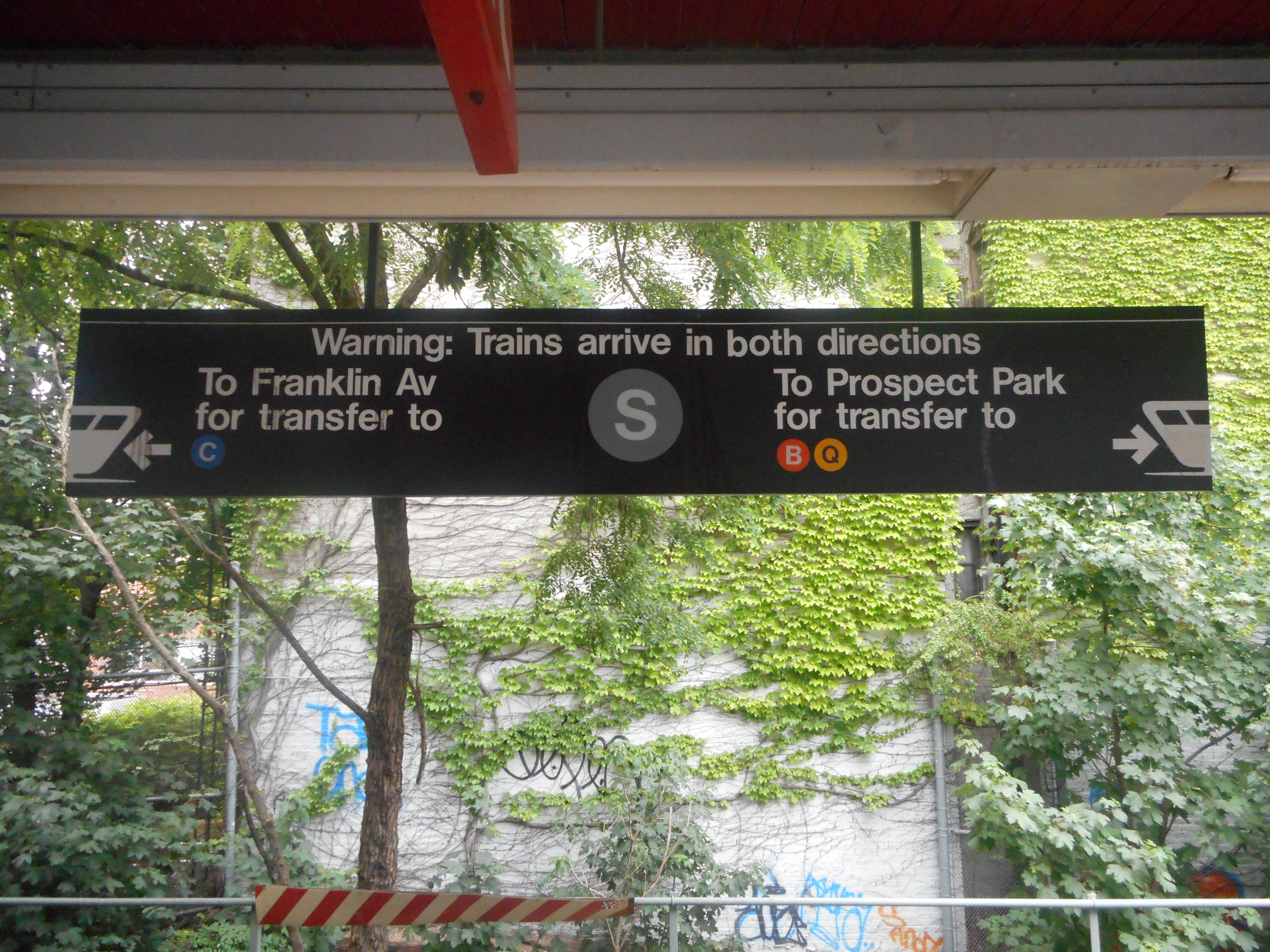
Train information sign above the platform

The rebuilt 1999 station consists of a single side platform and a single track serving trains traveling in both directions. The new, wider, station platform was built partly over the former southbound track. The large station house is built in a style reminiscent of station houses built in the World War I era on the BMT Brighton Line such as Parkside Avenue and a number of stations on the BMT Sea Beach Line.

=== Exit ===
The station has a turnstile bank, token booth, a short staircase on the south side going down to the north side of Park Place, and a long ADA-accessible ramp and staircase going to the south side of Prospect Place on the north side of the station house.
