= BMT Franklin Avenue Line =

New York City Subway line

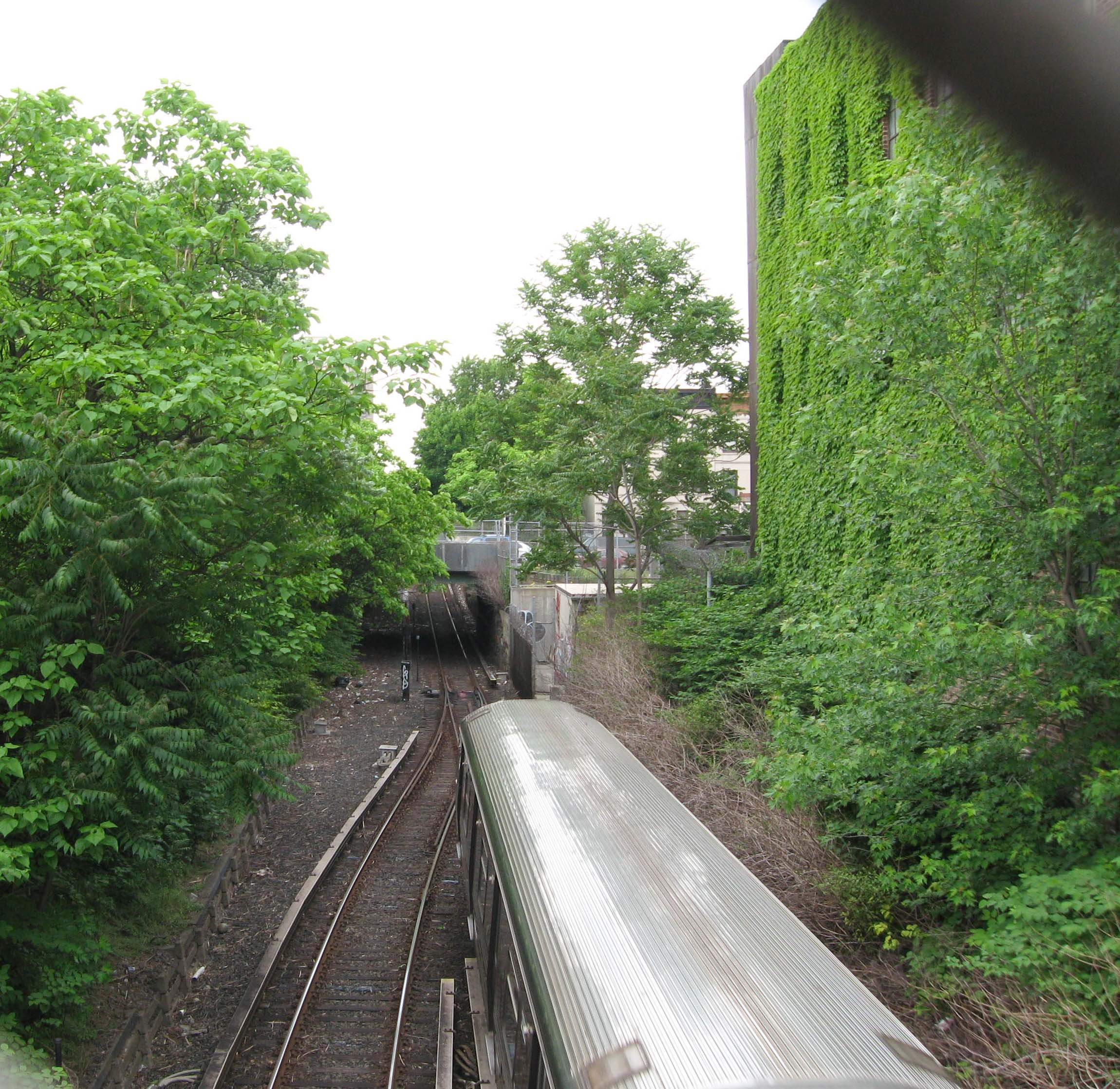
- The Franklin Avenue Shuttle train serves the entire BMT Franklin Avenue Line at all times.

Overview
- Owner: City of New York
- Locale: Brooklyn, New York City
- Termini: Franklin Avenue; Prospect Park
- Stations: 4

Service
- Type: Rapid transit
- System: New York City Subway
- Operator: New York City Transit Authority
- Daily ridership: 19,118

History
- Opened: July 2, 1878; 148 years ago

Technical
- Num of tracks: 1–2
- Character: Elevated, Embankment; Open cut
- Track gauge: 4 ft 8 1/2 in (1,435 mm)
- Electrification: 600V DC third rail

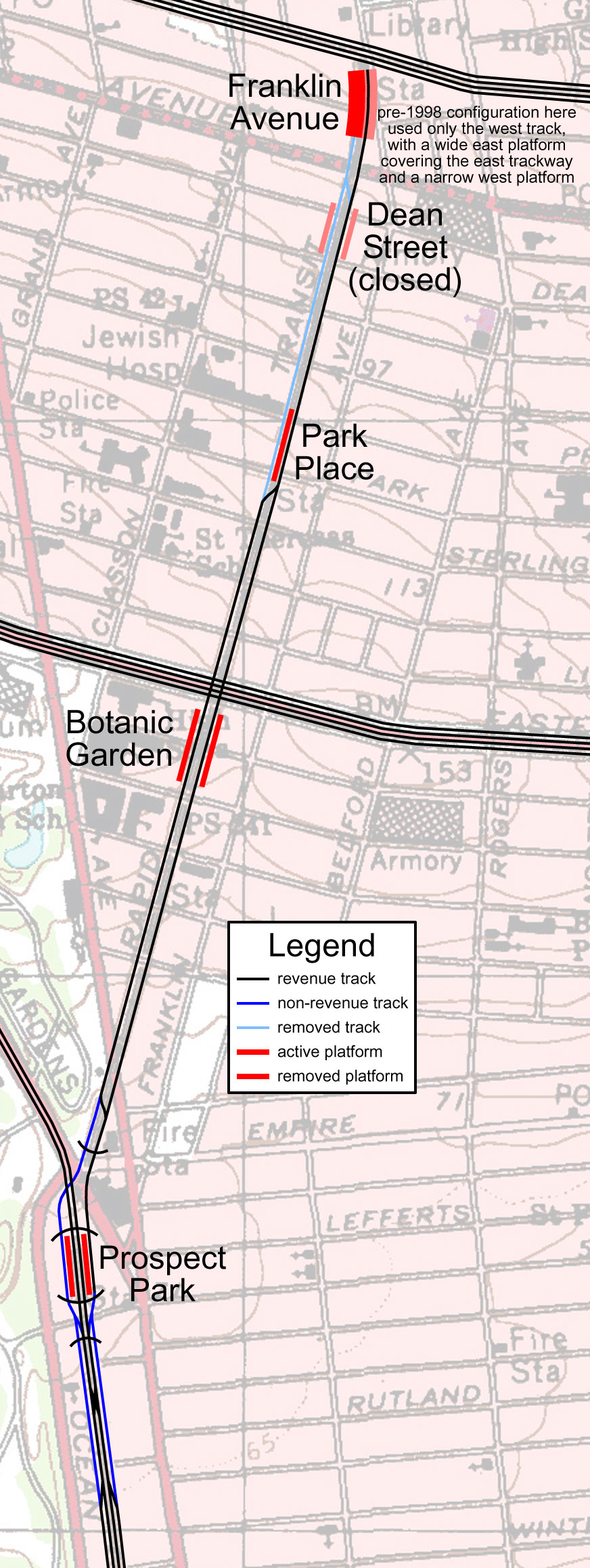
Franklin Avenue Shuttle track map

The BMT Franklin Avenue Line (also known as the Brighton–Franklin Line) is a rapid transit line of the New York City Subway's B Division in Brooklyn, New York, running between Franklin Avenue and Prospect Park. Service is full-time, and provided by the Franklin Avenue Shuttle. The line serves the neighborhoods of Bedford-Stuyvesant, Crown Heights and the Prospect Lefferts Gardens subsection of Flatbush and allows for easy connections between the IND Fulton Street and the BMT Brighton lines.

The line was originally part of the Brooklyn, Flatbush, and Coney Island Railway, which was created to connect Downtown Brooklyn with Coney Island. This Franklin Avenue Line opened in 1878 as part of the railway. Trains continued via the Long Island Rail Road to get to Downtown Brooklyn. In 1896, a connection was built with the Fulton Street Elevated, providing direct service to Manhattan. In 1905 and 1906, the line was elevated near Park Place to eliminate the last remaining grade crossings.

In 1913, the line was acquired by the Brooklyn Rapid Transit (BRT), which consolidated various railroad lines in Brooklyn. As part of the Dual Contracts of 1913, the BRT planned to connect the Brighton Line to a more direct subway route under Flatbush Avenue as part of Contract 4. The worst rapid transit wreck in the New York City Subway's history, the Malbone Street Wreck, occurred on November 1, 1918, when a five-car wooden elevated train derailed while approaching the Prospect Park station, killing at least 93 people. In 1920, the Franklin Avenue Line was severed from the Fulton Street Elevated, and Brighton Line trains started using the new subway under Flatbush Avenue.

The line's condition deteriorated in the 1980s and 1990s, and as a result it was nearly abandoned. One station, Dean Street, was closed in 1995 due to low ridership. After pleas from the local community and transit advocacy groups, the MTA agreed to spend $74 million to rehabilitate the line. The line was closed for eighteen months in 1998 and 1999, during which the track layout was changed and the stations were rebuilt.

== History ==
=== Origins ===
What is now the Franklin Avenue Line was part of the modern-day Brighton Beach Line until 1920, when the two lines were split north of Prospect Park. The Brooklyn, Flatbush, and Coney Island Railway (BF&CI), which built the Brighton Line, was incorporated in 1877 in order to connect Downtown Brooklyn with the hotels and resorts at Coney Island, Manhattan Beach, and Brighton Beach. The line opened on July 1, 1878, originally running from the Willink Plaza entrance of Prospect Park at Flatbush Avenue and Ocean Avenue to the Brighton Beach Hotel. However, the railroad desired to get the line closer to downtown Brooklyn. There was a problem: the line could not pass through Prospect Park, since the park had been built specifically as a retreat from the busyness of New York City. Therefore, the line was to be built in a trench through the hill in Crown Heights, connecting with the tracks of the Long Island Rail Road (LIRR) at Atlantic Avenue. The route was built on the surface between Bedford Terminal (at Atlantic Avenue) and Park Place, and was built in an open cut to Prospect Park and beyond to Church Avenue in Flatbush in order to avoid grade crossings and to placate the local community. This portion of the Brighton Beach Line represented a routing compromise, since the bypass route through Crown Heights was 2.3 miles (3.7 km) long, while the BF&CI's preferred direct routing to Downtown Brooklyn would have measured only 1.7 miles (2.7 km). The Crown Heights routing took the BF&CI north to the Bedford station of the LIRR. This portion of the BF&CI's mainline would become the Franklin Avenue Line. Later on, in order to accommodate larger locomotives for LIRR through-service, the open cut had to be dug deeper.

This portion formally opened on August 19, 1878, about six weeks after the rest of the Brighton Line opened. This portion of the Brighton Beach Line went north to the LIRR's Bedford station, where Brighton trains could merge onto LIRR tracks and operate to the Flatbush Avenue Terminal at Flatbush Avenue and Atlantic Avenue. However, the LIRR later gained control of the New York and Manhattan Beach Railway, a competitor of the BF&CI, and on December 14, 1883, ended the agreement to provide equal access to the Flatbush Avenue Terminal. The BF&CI was forced to end its trains at Bedford, a situation which led to its bankruptcy in 1884. Three years later, the BF&CI line was reorganized as the Brooklyn and Brighton Beach Railroad.

The Kings County Elevated Railway (KCER) wanted to link the Brighton Beach Railroad, running west of Franklin Avenue, to its elevated railway above Fulton Street. However, there was a problem: the LIRR's Atlantic Branch right-of-way, running along Atlantic Avenue, separated the Brighton Beach Railroad's Bedford Terminal to the south and the Fulton Street Line to the north. The LIRR vigorously defended its right to prevent any other railroad companies from crossing its right-of-way, and it only backed down after the KCER brought litigation against the LIRR. Moreover, store owners on Franklin Avenue and Fulton Street opposed the creation of an additional elevated link between the Brighton Beach Railroad and the Fulton Street elevated. The BF&CI won its lawsuit against the LIRR in 1889, but the victory was largely symbolic since the Brighton Beach Railroad had replaced the BF&CI.

In February 1896, the railroad was leased by the KCER. On August 15, 1896, the railroad gained a connection with it by means of a ramp and short elevated railway. The connection linked to the Fulton Street Elevated, which ran from Downtown Brooklyn to City Line at the border with Queens County at Liberty and Grant Avenues and had been completed in 1893. From there the line bridged over Atlantic Avenue, where the LIRR was still operating at-grade. As part of the Atlantic Avenue improvement program, this portion of the LIRR was placed in a tunnel between 1903 and 1905. Additionally, provisions were provided for a future two-track connection in Downtown Brooklyn near the current Atlantic Terminal, leading from the Atlantic Branch to the Brighton Line.

Also in 1896, a new entity, the Brooklyn Rapid Transit Company (BRT), was created to consolidate the surface and elevated lines in Brooklyn. This enabled the KCER to operate its steam-powered elevated trains on the Brighton Line via the Franklin Avenue Line's right-of-way, providing Brighton riders with direct service to downtown Manhattan via the Brooklyn Bridge. Brooklyn and Brighton Beach Railroad trains continued to run from Bedford Terminal, but this service was soon abandoned, though the track connections were retained. In 1899, elevated trains began to run via the Brighton Line in addition to steam service. All steam service stopped running by 1903.

The first electrification of the Brighton Line, including the Franklin Avenue Line, was accomplished in 1899 using trolley wire. Trains that used third rail in elevated service raised trolley poles at Franklin Avenue station. Some of the line poles that held up the wire required for the operation still exist along the line. In 1905 and 1906, the last remaining grade crossings were eliminated in the vicinity of Park Place by building an elevated structure to connect the old elevated structure and the open-cut portion. In the ensuing years, some existing bridges were strengthened or replaced and some of the elevated trackage was placed on concrete-retained embankment.

A series of leases and mergers at the beginning of the 20th century ended the independent existence of a number of elevated and suburban railroads, including the Kings County Line and the bankrupt Brooklyn and Brighton Beach. Brooklyn was consolidated into the City of Greater New York in 1898. The new city turned its attention to subway building and the Interborough Rapid Transit Company had a leg up in landing the first two contracts. The Brooklyn interests, represented by the BRT, sought to win new subway contracts to integrate its system of elevated and suburban roads into new subways to be built. One such subway connection would bypass the Franklin Avenue route by funneling the Brighton Line through a direct subway route under Flatbush Avenue as part of Contract 4 of the Dual Contracts of 1913. Construction for the connection required the Coney Island-bound track to be diverted in a new tunnel to cross over the new subway connection and enter the rebuilt four-track Prospect Park station as an outside track. This track has a sharp curve that, coming from the north, has a sharp S-curve to the right and then to the left.

The construction of this new connection directly contributed to the Malbone Street Wreck on November 1, 1918, which became at the time the worst rapid transit wreck in world history. A five-car wooden elevated train, heading southbound along the Franklin Avenue Line passed the Consumers Park station without stopping, left the tracks and crashed into one of the new tunnel walls, killing 97. The collision was found to be caused by an inexperienced motorman who was speeding down the line into the southbound S-curve at an estimated 30 to 40 miles per hour into the curve, which had a 6 mph speed restriction. It remains the deadliest crash in the New York City Subway's history, as well as one of the worst rapid-transit crashes in the history of the United States.

=== Brighton subway connection ===
On August 1, 1920, the Brighton Beach Line was connected to the Broadway subway in Manhattan via the Montague Street Tunnel under the East River, as well as a tunnel connection underneath Flatbush Avenue. At the same time, track connections to the Fulton Street Elevated were severed so that through service to Brooklyn Bridge was no longer possible. Subway trains from Manhattan and elevated trains from Franklin Avenue shared operations to Coney Island. A connection and cross-platform interchange between the Brighton Beach and Franklin Avenue Lines was made at Prospect Park, where Franklin Avenue trains used the outer tracks and Brighton Beach trains used the inner tracks. South of Prospect Park, there are switches between all four tracks, allowing southbound trains from either line to run either local or express to Coney Island, as well as permitting northbound local and express trains from Coney Island to access either line. On the four-track Brighton Beach main line south of Prospect Park, the inner pair of tracks are for express trains, and the outer pair of tracks are for local trains.

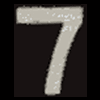
Route designation on BMT Triplex equipment

The line continued to operate elevated train service on the Brighton Beach main line until 1928, after which similar services were continued with steel subway cars. For the summer excursion season of 1924, the Franklin Avenue Line was upgraded for the operation of six-car subway trains, and was assigned the BMT number 7. This service used the Brighton Line during most daytime hours. During warm weather, express service ran to Coney Island on weekends during the day.

In the 1920s, transportation officials discussed the possibility of an extension of the line. It was proposed that the line would be extended beyond Fulton Street, run across central Brooklyn, and link up with other BRT lines in Long Island City. Provisions for this line were made in the elevated structure at Queensboro Plaza, but no other parts of the line were built as the plan never left the talking stages. A crosstown line would eventually be built in the 1930s; however, it was part of the city-operated Independent Subway System, not the BRT.

The Fulton Street Elevated, to which the Franklin Avenue line was originally connected, closed in 1940 and was replaced by the IND Fulton Street Line. A free transfer was instituted between the Fulton Street subway and the Franklin Avenue elevated.

In 1958, a new switch was installed north of Prospect Park, allowing trains to reverse ends at the easternmost track at Prospect Park, which had formerly served northbound Franklin Avenue Line trains. This eliminated a traffic bottleneck in which southbound Franklin Avenue Line trains, arriving on the westernmost track at Prospect Park, reversed directions by crossing over two active Brighton Line tracks to the northbound Franklin Avenue Line track, thereby delaying train traffic. As a result, most trains avoided negotiating the sharp S-curve where the Malbone Street Wreck had occurred. Trains that are being taken out of service continue to use the old route.

Prior to the Brooklyn Dodgers' relocation to Los Angeles for their 1958 season, the Franklin Avenue Line was one of the busiest routes to their games at Ebbets Field, located in Flatbush near the southern end of the line. A 1982 New York Times article described the line as the "gateway to Ebbets Field".

=== Decline ===
After the city gained ownership of the line in 1940, Brighton-Franklin services gradually declined. A major blow to the viability of through-service occurred in 1954 when the D train of the IND Division was extended to Coney Island via the Culver Line, deprived the Franklin of a major source of transfer traffic, consisting of passengers from Harlem and the Bronx, who now had a more direct route to Coney Island. Brighton-Franklin express service ended in 1954, and the Franklin Avenue Line became a full-time shuttle in 1963. On November 1, 1965, when R27 subway cars started going into service, this service was named SS. In 1985, when the practice of using double letters was eliminated, this service became the S.

On December 1, 1974, a southbound shuttle train of R32s was approaching the tunnel portal en route from Franklin Avenue when it derailed on the crossover and smashed the same place where BRT car 100 had hit in the Malbone Street Wreck. This derailment resulted in some injuries, but there were no fatalities, because time signals limited the speed of trains coming down the hill from Crown Heights.

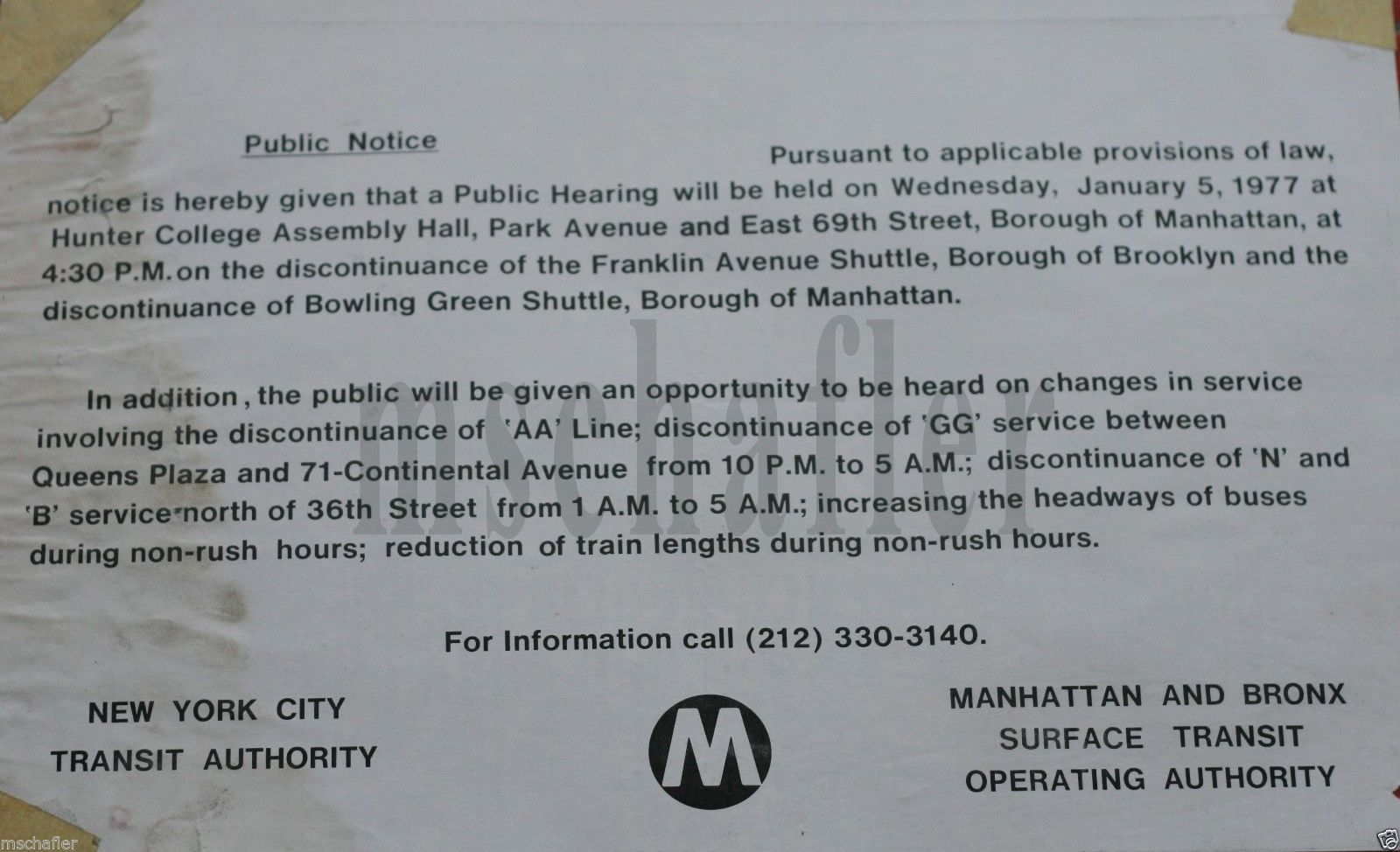
Poster announcing the public hearing that was held in 1977 to discuss the planned closure of the Franklin Avenue Line and other service cuts.

In January 1977, the Metropolitan Transportation Authority (MTA)'s Emergency Financial Control Board proposed abandoning the severely deteriorated line due to cutbacks in city funding. The local community was outraged at the plan and was successful in saving the shuttle for the meantime. A coalition of about 5,000 passengers, including local businessmen, the Jewish Hospital and Medical Center, staff workers of the Bureau of Child Welfare and representation from local high schools, showed up to a meeting on January 5 to protest the planned cut. They were aided by Congress members Shirley Chisholm and Fred Richmond, who issued a statement in support of the riders of the shuttle, including 2,000 students.

In 1981, the MTA proposed abandoning the severely deteriorated line under the failed Program for Action. At the time, only 10,000 daily passengers used the line. It was proposed that bus service along nearby Franklin Avenue could substitute for the line. During the winter, the line would often be closed because there was fear that trains would derail. Stations were in horrible condition; portions of the wooden platforms were sealed off because they had burned or collapsed. From January to March 1982, the line needed to be closed for emergency repair work because a retaining wall along the line was in danger of collapse. An MTA spokeswoman said that the repairs would only last for three years and $38 to $60 million would be needed to rebuild the line. She said that the MTA was considering ending service on the line permanently.

In 1986, the New York City Transit Authority launched a study to determine whether to close 79 stations on 11 routes, including the entire Franklin Avenue Line, due to low ridership and high repair costs. Numerous figures, including New York City Council member Carol Greitzer, criticized the plans.

By the 1990s the Franklin Avenue Shuttle was known as the "ghost train" and the Franklin Avenue Line was very dilapidated. Shuttle trains' lengths were shrunk from four to two cars, and the platforms were so poorly maintained that they were literally crumbling. However, the MTA was still lacking the funds to renovate the line from end to end. The Dean Street station, which had 50 paying riders per day, was closed in 1995. The entire line was under consideration for abandonment, and community leaders were opposed to the move. They showed up to town hall meetings, news conferences and they sat down with transit officials. They also formed the committee to Save the Franklin Avenue Shuttle. The coalition included the Straphangers Campaign, a local church, local community boards and the New York City Environmental Justice Alliance. They argued that subway station repair work occurred elsewhere, when no attention was paid to the Franklin Avenue Shuttle.

=== Restoration ===
The civic groups ultimately convinced the New York State Assembly to force the MTA to rebuild rather than abandon the line, and at its April 26, 1996 board meeting, it announced that the shuttle would be closed for eighteen months so that the line could be rehabilitated for $63 million. As a result, most of the supporting infrastructure and stations were completely rehabilitated for eighteen months, between July 1998 and October 1999 at a cost of $74 million. Closing the shuttle full time was estimated to save time and $22 million. While the closure of the line started in July 1998, work began in September 1997. The contract on the bid was out in February 1997. During the renovation, a temporary shuttle bus and the B48 bus replaced train service. The line reopened on October 18, 1999, three months ahead of schedule.

As part of the rehabilitation, three stations were rebuilt, elevators were installed at the Fulton Street station, tracks and bridges were replaced, and security cameras and new artwork were added. 0.4 miles (640 m) of double track on the elevated portion of the structure, deemed unnecessary, was removed, and 1.4 miles (2,300 m) of track was replaced. The signal system between the Botanic Garden and Franklin Avenue stations was replaced and rehabilitated. The transfer to the IND Fulton Street Line had required an out-of-system paper transfer, but an enclosed transfer was built with two elevators and an escalator. Prior to this enclosed transfer, a portion of the Fulton Street Elevated line was left standing so passengers could use a staircase to transfer to the Fulton Street Line. The closed Dean Street station was demolished as part of the project. The local community agreed to close the station in exchange for the construction of a new passageway to provide transfers to the IRT Eastern Parkway Line at Botanic Garden. MetroCard vending machines and improved speakers were also installed in the stations.

Once the line was reopened there were still calls to restore the Dean Street station, and there were complaints that the Botanic Garden and Prospect Park stops were not made ADA accessible. Prospect Park was made accessible in a later project. The bridge carrying the line above St. Marks Avenue was replaced in 2024, marking the first major modification to the line since its 1998 reconstruction.

== Description ==
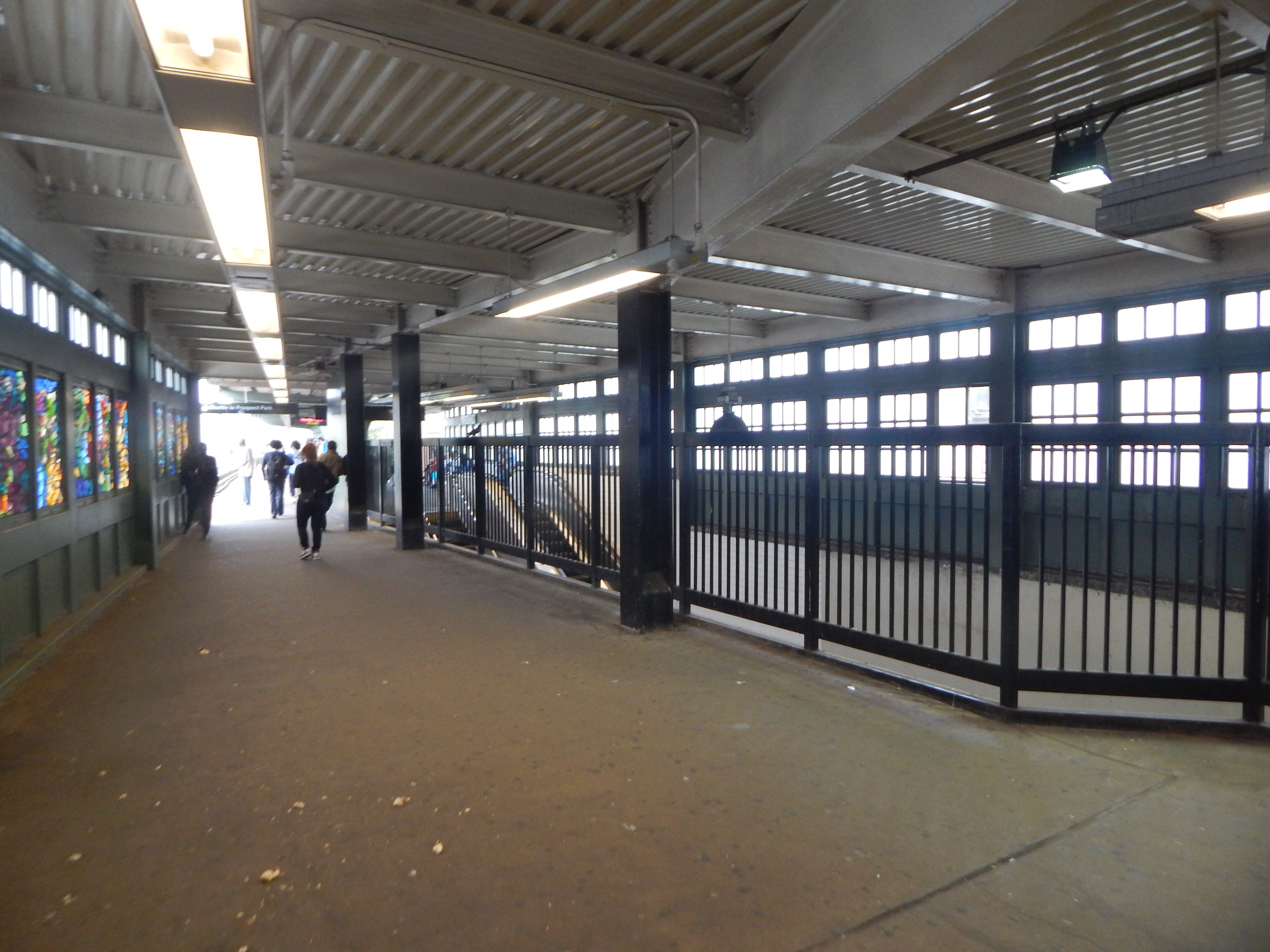
Transfer passageway to the Franklin Avenue Line platform at Fulton Street/Franklin Avenue

At Fulton Street and Franklin Avenue, where the Fulton Street Elevated had given way to the IND Fulton Street Line subway, a large station is present with modern conveniences, elevators and escalators, providing an easier transfer between the Fulton Street Line and the Franklin Avenue Line. From that station, most of the original steelwork from elevated days has been removed and replaced with heavier construction. The line runs on a single track from Franklin/Fulton to another new station at Park Place. This elevated section, opened in 1896 to connect the original line to the Fulton Street Elevated, was rebuilt along the original line's old right-of-way to reduce costs. Though this portion of the line uses much of the reinforced viaduct from 1903 to 1905, it was totally reconstructed in 1999. There was once a stop at Dean Street, between the Fulton Street and Park Place stations. The Dean Street station closed in 1995 because it was one of the least used stations in the system, and because it was in very poor condition. The station still had wooden platforms, which were a safety hazard, as well as incandescent lighting, although all other stations had been upgraded with fluorescent lamps. The station was demolished upon its closure, and the only visible remnant of the station is a sidewalk street lamp which used to illuminate the staircase leading from the station platform.

The line then crosses a bridge over Park Place. Park Place was placed at a lower elevation in 1905 in order to eliminate the grade crossing. To allow vehicular traffic to pass under the line, the street descends to as much as 3 feet (0.91 m) below its elevation on either side of the Franklin Avenue Line overpass. Since the sidewalk remains at the same elevation as on either side, stairs are provided between the road's curb and the sidewalk.

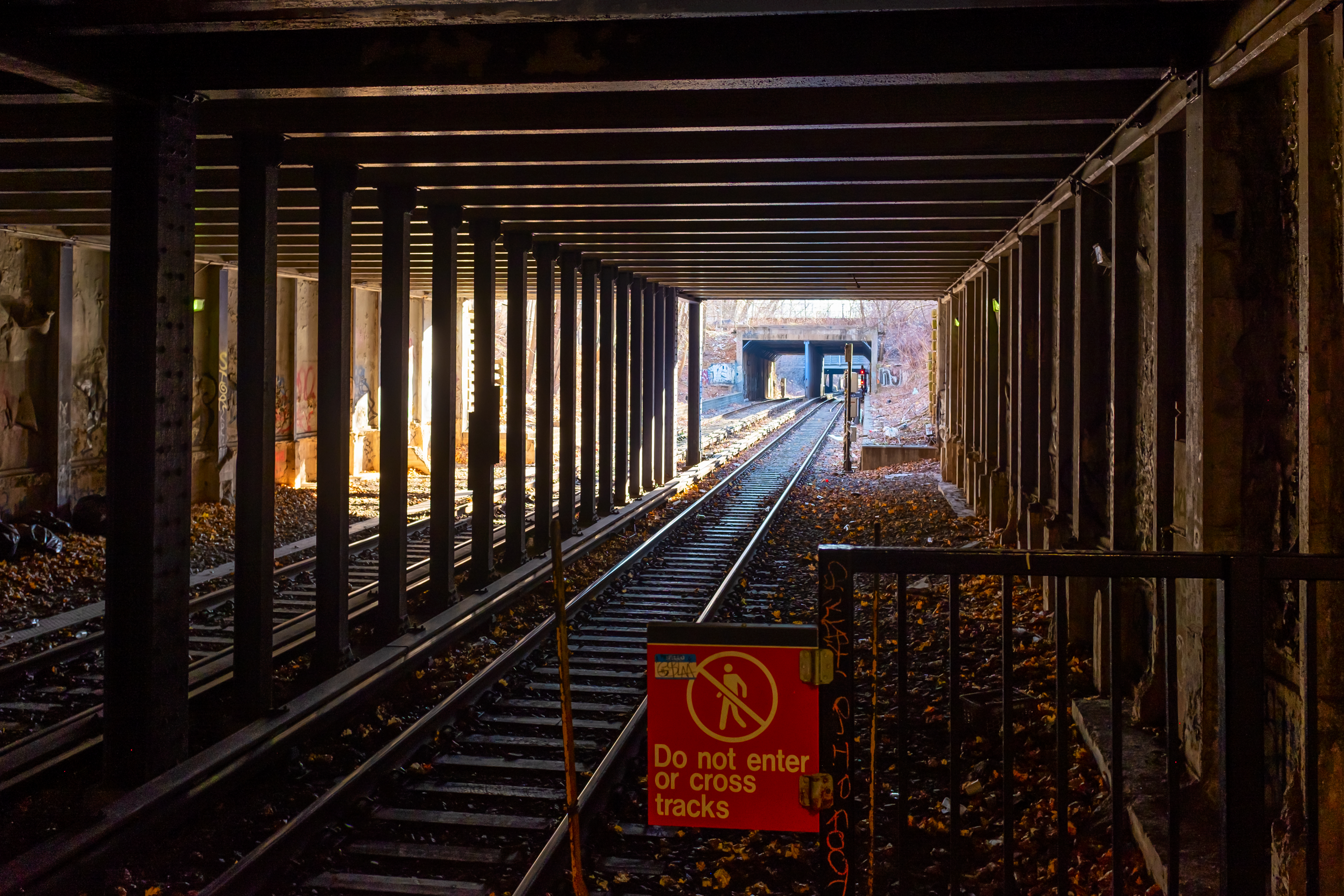
Trackage looking south from Botanic Garden station

After Park Place, the line broadens from one to two tracks Between Park Place and Sterling Place, the line descends to an open cut along a ramp that opened in 1896 as part of the Fulton Street Elevated connection project and enters the near-original 1878 right-of-way, including the original railroad-style tunnel under Eastern Parkway. The south end of the tunnel contains the rehabilitated Botanic Garden station, originally built in 1928. All three stations between Franklin Avenue and Botanic Garden were rebuilt or renovated with elements such as distinctive artwork, masonry and ironwork funded by New York City Transit's "Arts in Transit" program. From Botanic Garden, the line continues on its original 1878 roadbed and connects with the main part of the Brighton Line at Prospect Park. Before entering Prospect Park, trains switch to the northbound track, which continues straight and enters a tunnel. The shuttle terminates on the northbound outer track of the four-track Prospect Park station. The rarely used (Note: Every night, the 10:45 pm train from Franklin Avenue terminates on the southbound local track at Prospect Park. In addition, on the rare occurrence that the northbound track has to be taken out of service for work, the southbound track will become an absolute block the entire length of the line, with one train operating in both directions. Signals will be bagged, and stop arms will be held down for this operation.) southbound track (where the Malbone Street Wreck took place) also enters a tunnel, curving sharply west and then south to swing around the Brighton Beach Line tracks, which approach Prospect Park from the northwest and feed into the station's two inner tracks. The southbound Franklin Avenue Line track then connects to the southbound outer track at Prospect Park.

The line's signals are controlled by the DeKalb Avenue Tower, located at the DeKalb Avenue station in Downtown Brooklyn. The BMT Franklin Avenue Line is exclusively served by the Franklin Avenue Shuttle at all times.

== Station listing ==
Station service legend
Stops all times	Stops 24 hours a day
Time period details
Disabled access	Station is compliant with the Americans with Disabilities Act
↑	Station is compliant with the Americans with Disabilities Act in the indicated direction only
↓	Station is compliant with the Americans with Disabilities Act in the indicated direction only
	Elevator access to mezzanine only

Neighborhood (approximate)	Disabled access	Station	Services	Opened	Transfers and notes
Bedford–Stuyvesant	Disabled access	Franklin Avenue	S	August 15, 1896	A C (IND Fulton Street Line)
Bedford–Stuyvesant		Bedford		August 19, 1878	Replaced by Franklin Avenue in 1896. The location was then served by Dean Street (now closed). Track connection and some facilities retained until disconnected during 1904–1905 rebuilding.
Crown Heights		Dean Street		August 15, 1896	Closed c. 1899; (Note: The exact date of closure is unknown, but by November 1899, one John Costello of Brooklyn had filed a complaint with the New York State Board of Railroad Commissioners. According to a 1901 report, the Brighton Beach Railroad had applied for abandonment of the Dean Street station.) re-opened October 28, 1901. Closed again in 1995; now demolished
Crown Heights	Disabled access	Park Place	S	June 19, 1899	
Crown Heights		Botanic Garden (2nd iteration)	S	September 30, 1928	2 3 4 5 (IRT Eastern Parkway Line at Franklin Avenue–Medgar Evers College)
Crown Heights		Consumers Park		June 19, 1899	Renamed Botanic Garden (1st iteration) c. 1924. Closed and demolished in 1928 and replaced by the second iteration of Botanic Garden
Flatbush	Disabled access	Prospect Park	S	July 1, 1878	B Q (BMT Brighton Line); normally uses northbound platform
merges with BMT Brighton Line to become its local tracks (no regular service)
