= Franklin Avenue/Botanic Garden station =

New York City Subway station in Brooklyn

Franklin Avenue/Botanic Garden
- New York City Subway station complex
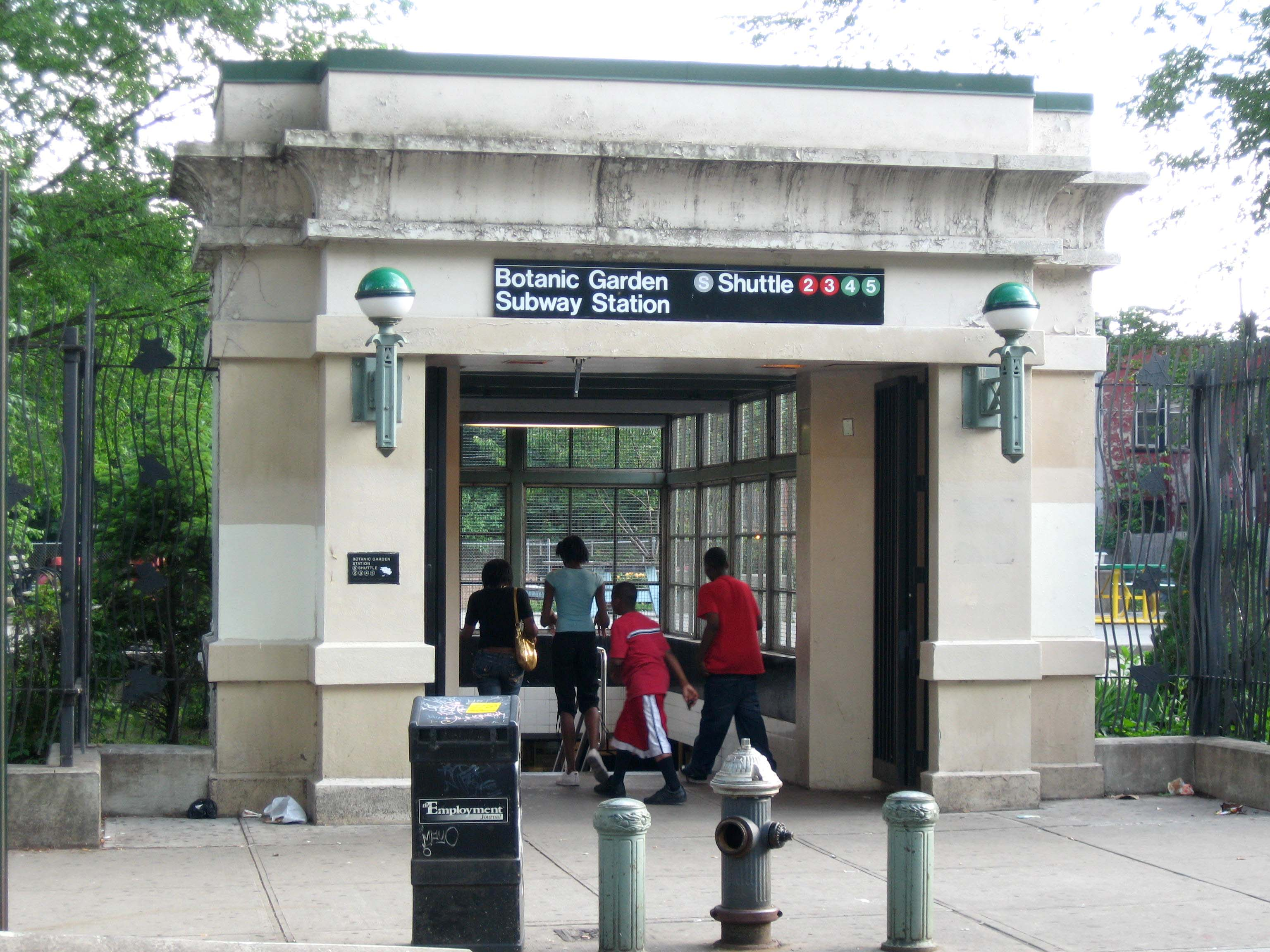
- Entrance to the BMT station

Station statistics
- Address: Franklin Avenue & Eastern Parkway; Brooklyn, New York
- Borough: Brooklyn
- Locale: Crown Heights
- Coordinates: 40.670711°N 73.958545°W
- Division: A (IRT), B (BMT)
- Line: IRT Eastern Parkway Line; BMT Franklin Avenue Line
- Services: 2 (all times); 3 (all except late nights); 4 (all times); 5 (weekdays only); S (all times)
- Transit: NYCT Bus: B45, B48
- Levels: 2

Other information
- Opened: 1999
- Accessible: No; planned

Traffic
- 2025: 3,663,237 ▲6%
- Rank: 97 out of 423
Location
Location within New York City Subway
Location within New York City
Location within New York
Street map
Station service legend
Symbol	Description
Stops all times except late nights	Stops all times except late nights
Stops all times	Stops all times
Stops late nights only	Stops late nights only
Stops weekdays during the day	Stops weekdays during the day

The Franklin Avenue/Botanic Garden station is a New York City Subway station complex shared by the IRT Eastern Parkway Line and the BMT Franklin Avenue Line. Located at the intersection of Franklin Avenue and Eastern Parkway in the Crown Heights neighborhood of Brooklyn, the complex consists of two distinct stations, connected by a passageway within fare control, and is named for its proximity to the Brooklyn Botanic Garden. The Eastern Parkway Line station is served by the 2 and 4 trains at all times, the 3 train at all times except late nights, and the 5 train on weekdays only. The Franklin Avenue Line station is served by Franklin Avenue Shuttle (S) at all times.

The BMT station has two side platforms and two tracks, while the IRT station has two island platforms and four tracks. The free transfer between the Eastern Parkway and Franklin Avenue shuttle platforms was added in 1999 using a passageway that had existed since October 1928, when the BMT Botanic Garden station opened.

== History ==
=== Development of IRT station ===
Franklin Avenue station was constructed as part of the Eastern Parkway Line. The line's section to Atlantic Avenue was part of Contract 2 of the Interborough Rapid Transit Company (IRT)'s plan to construct an extension of the original subway, Contract 1. Contract 2 extended the original line from City Hall in Manhattan to Atlantic Avenue in Brooklyn. The Board of Rapid Transit Commissioners approved the route on September 27, 1900, and the contract was signed on September 11, 1902. Construction commenced on Contract 2 on March 4, 1903. The first section opened on January 9, 1908, extending the subway from Bowling Green to Borough Hall. On April 28, 1908, the IRT formally applied with the New York Public Service Commission for permission to open the final section of the Contract 2 line from Borough Hall to Atlantic Avenue near the Flatbush Avenue LIRR station. The application was approved, and the IRT extension opened on May 1, 1908.

On March 19, 1913, New York City, the Brooklyn Rapid Transit Company, and the IRT reached an agreement, known as the Dual Contracts, to drastically expand subway service across New York City. As part of Contract 3 of the agreement, between New York City and the IRT, the original subway opened by the IRT in 1904 to City Hall, and extended to Atlantic Avenue in 1908, was to be extended eastward into Brooklyn. The line was to be extended along Flatbush Avenue and Eastern Parkway to Buffalo Street as a four-track subway line, and then along East 98th Street and Livonia Avenue to New Lots Avenue as an elevated two-track line, with provisions for the addition of a third track. In addition, a two-track branch line along Nostrand Avenue branching off east of the Franklin Avenue station was to be constructed. The underground portion of the line became known as the Eastern Parkway Line, or Route 12, while the elevated portion became known as the New Lots Line.

The IRT Eastern Parkway Line was built as part of Route 12 from 1915 to 1918. On August 23, 1920, the Eastern Parkway Line was extended from Atlantic Avenue to Crown Heights–Utica Avenue, with the Franklin Avenue station opening at this time. The new trains would be served by trains from Seventh Avenue.

The New York City Board of Transportation announced plans in November 1949 to extend platforms at several IRT stations, including Franklin Avenue, to accommodate all doors on ten-car trains. Although ten-car trains already operated on the line, the rear car could not open its doors at the station because the platforms were so short. Funding for the platform extensions was included in the city's 1950 capital budget.

=== Development of BMT station ===
There was no station on the BMT Franklin Avenue Line at this location until October 1, 1928, when the new station that had been authorized in December 1926 to replace Consumers Park station was opened. Consumers Park had been renamed Botanic Garden on December 30, 1919. The new station assumed this name upon opening on September 30, 1928, and the old station closed at the same time.

=== Creation of a free transfer ===
In April 1993, the New York State Legislature agreed to give the MTA $9.6 billion for capital improvements. Some of the funds would be used to renovate nearly one hundred New York City Subway stations, including Botanic Garden. The station had deteriorated over the years as the New York City Transit Authority considered whether to abandon or rehabilitate the station and the Franklin Avenue Line. Support in the Bedford-Stuyvesant and Crown Heights communities persuaded the city to rebuild the line from July 1998 to September 1999. A transfer to Franklin Avenue on the IRT Eastern Parkway Line was added via a passageway that connects the Franklin Avenue-bound platform to the IRT mezzanine. Prior to the rehabilitation project, only a portion of the station was in the tunnel, as the platforms were longer and continued outdoors.

In July 2025, the MTA announced that it would install elevators at 12 stations, including both Franklin Avenue–Medgar Evers College and Botanic Garden, as part of its 2025–2029 capital program. The elevators would make the stations fully compliant with the Americans with Disabilities Act of 1990.

== Station layout ==
=== Exits ===
Due to the free transfer passageway, all exits serve all platforms. From the Franklin Avenue Line station, there is a staircase to the south side of Eastern Parkway between Franklin Avenue and Classon Avenue, above the right-of-way. From the Eastern Parkway Line station, there are staircases to the northeast and southeast corners of Eastern Parkway and Franklin Avenue, and to the north and south side malls of Eastern Parkway to the east of Franklin Avenue.

== BMT Franklin Avenue Line platforms ==
Botanic Garden
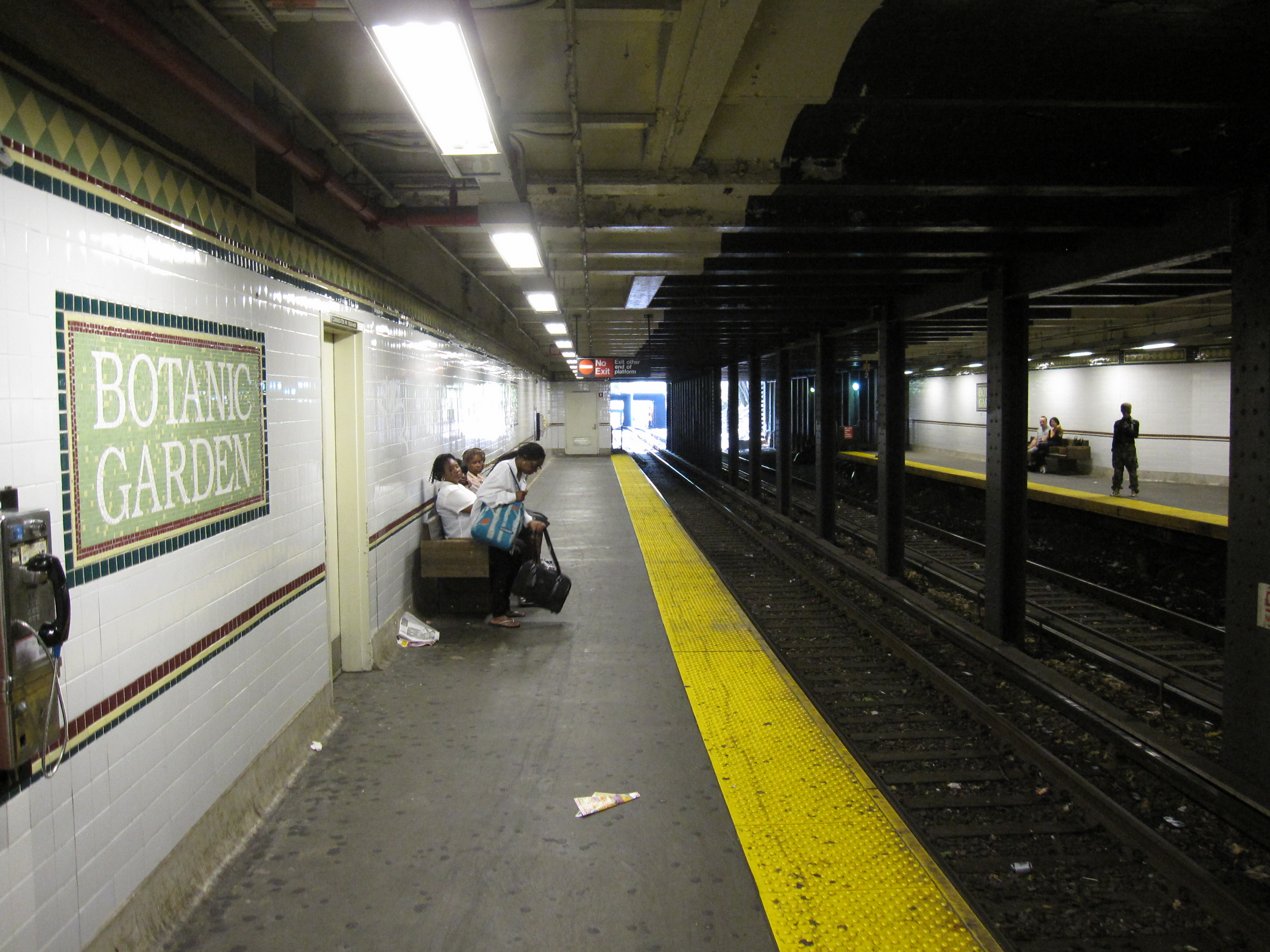
- Northbound platform

Station statistics
- Division: B (BMT)
- Line: BMT Franklin Avenue Line
- Services: S (all times)
- Structure: Enclosed open-cut
- Platforms: 2 side platforms
- Tracks: 2

Other information
- Opened: September 30, 1928; 98 years ago
- Rebuilt: October 18, 1999; 27 years ago
- Accessible: No; planned
- Former/other names: Consumers Park
Services
Preceding station	New York City Subway	Following station
Park Place toward Franklin Avenue	Franklin Avenue	Prospect Park Terminus
Track layout
Station service legend
Symbol	Description
Stops all times	Stops all times

The Botanic Garden station on the BMT Franklin Avenue Line has two tracks and two side platforms. The Franklin Avenue Shuttle (S) train stops here at all times. The station is named for the Brooklyn Botanic Garden two blocks away from the station. The station is between Prospect Park to the south and Park Place to the north. Midway between this station and Park Place, the tracks merge into one.

The station's mezzanine is above the platforms and tracks. Two staircases from each side go up to a waiting area that allows a free transfer between directions; this is needed for passengers transferring between the IRT and Prospect Park-bound trains. Outside of the turnstile bank, there is a token booth and one street stair.

=== Consumers Park and modern Botanic Garden. ===
In 1902, the Consumers Park Brewery opened the Consumers Park station on the Brighton Beach Line. At the end of 1919, the station was renamed to Botanic Garden. In 1926, the BMT started work to replace the station. The rebuilt station was built in the open-cut right-of-way to the south of Eastern Parkway, and the half of the station closest to that street was roofed over in the appearance of a subway structure. The station is now located entirely inside the subway structure that was built in 1928. At street level, it features floral wrought iron fencing in recognition of its location near the Brooklyn Botanic Garden (entitled IL7/Square by Millie Burns). At track level, it includes 1920s-era mosaic tiling. To the immediate north of the station, the 1878 railroad tunnel that carries the line under Eastern Parkway has been dramatically lighted. This is the oldest tunnel currently in subway use.

=== Gallery ===
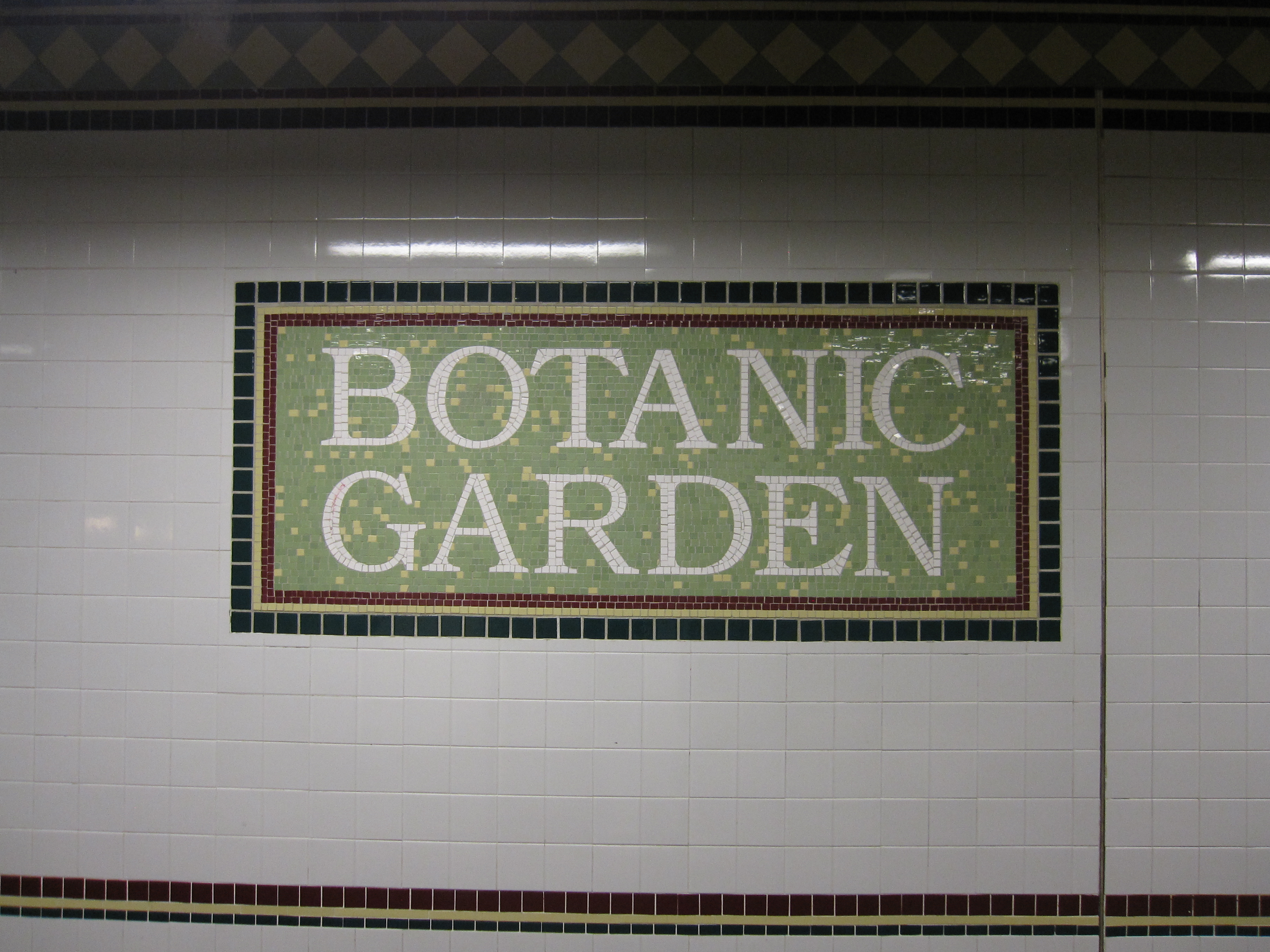
Mosaics with name

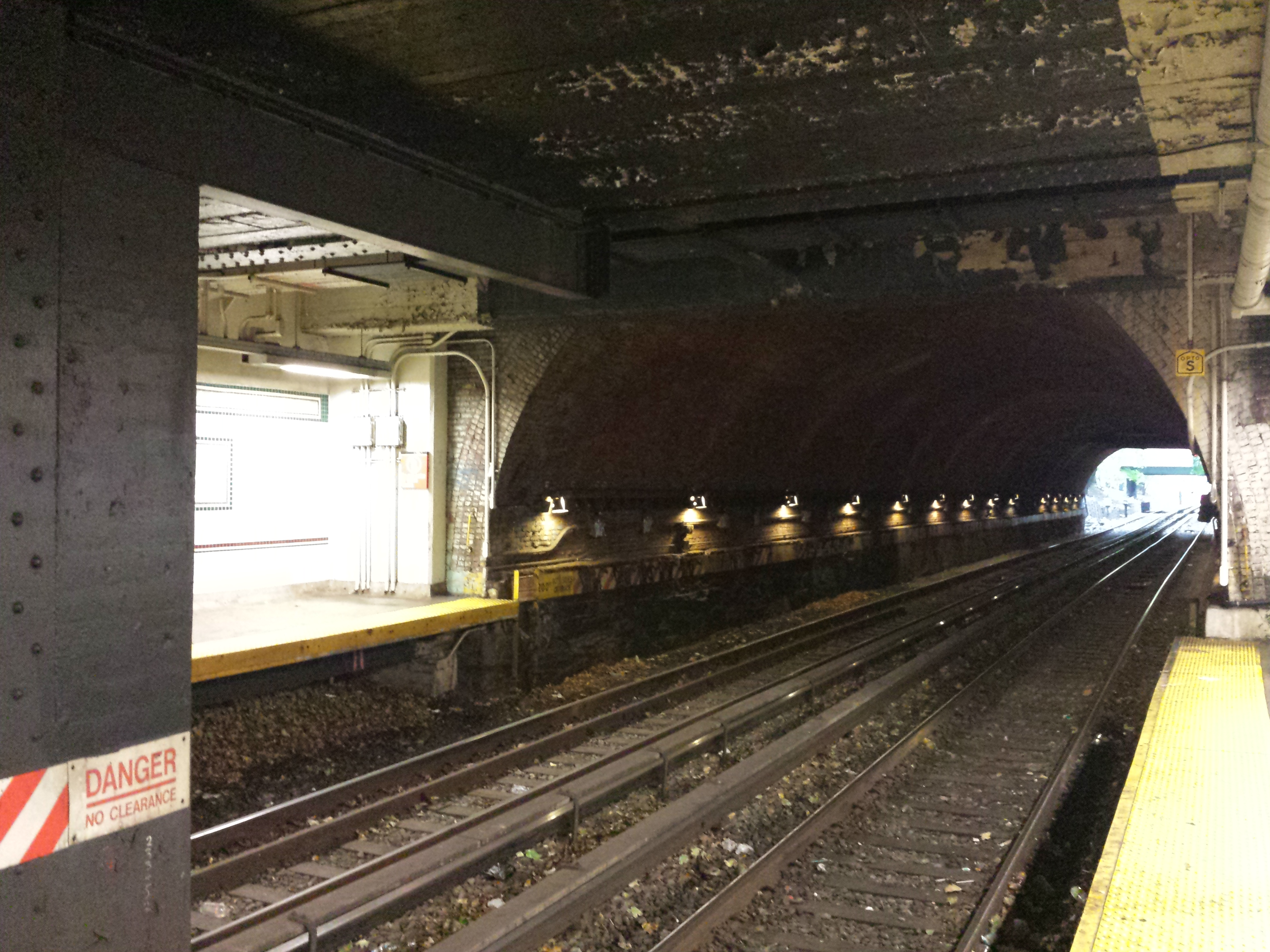
The tunnel north of the station

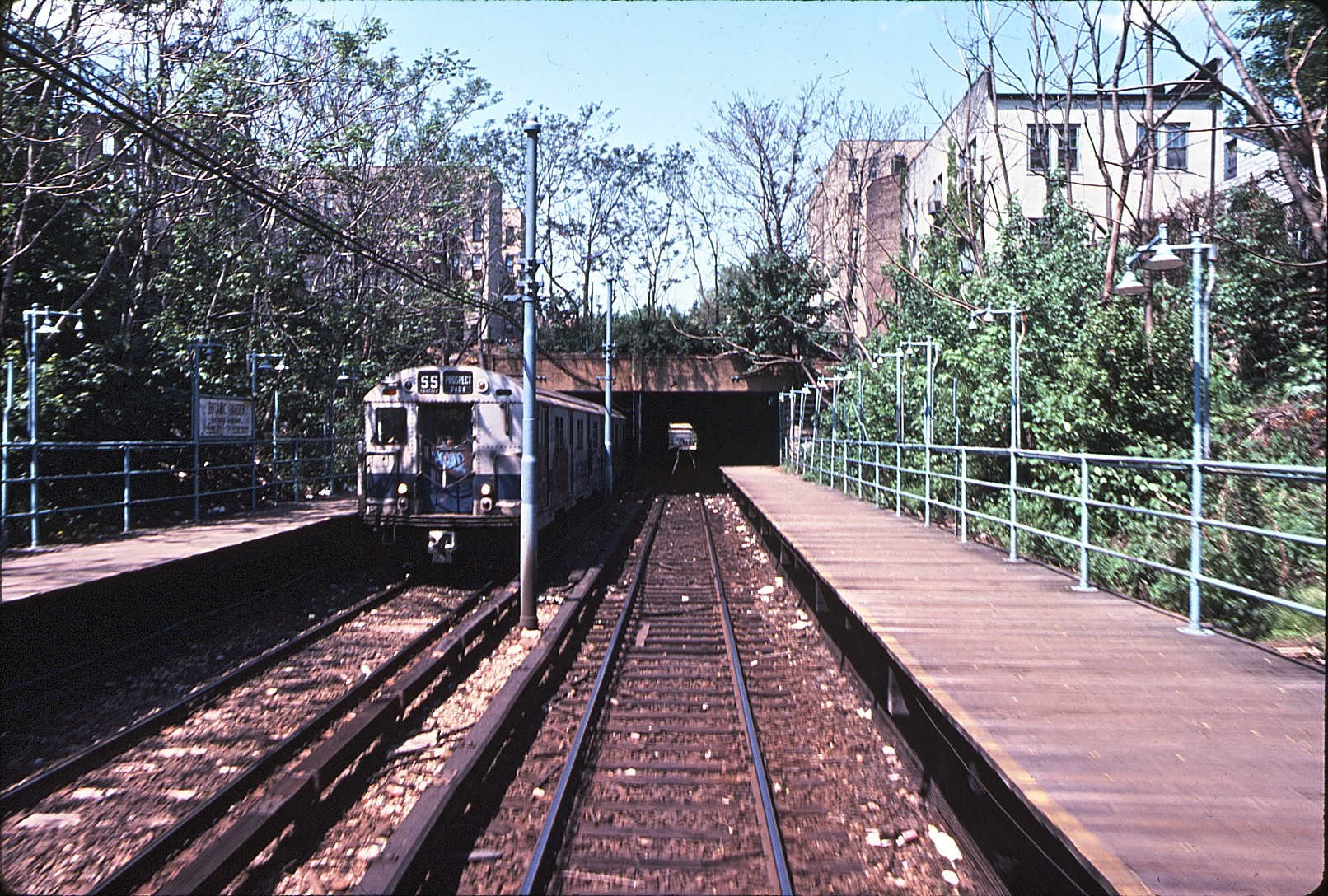
Station as it appeared in the late 1970s. The wooden platform extensions no longer exist

== IRT Eastern Parkway Line platforms ==
Franklin Avenue– Medgar Evers College
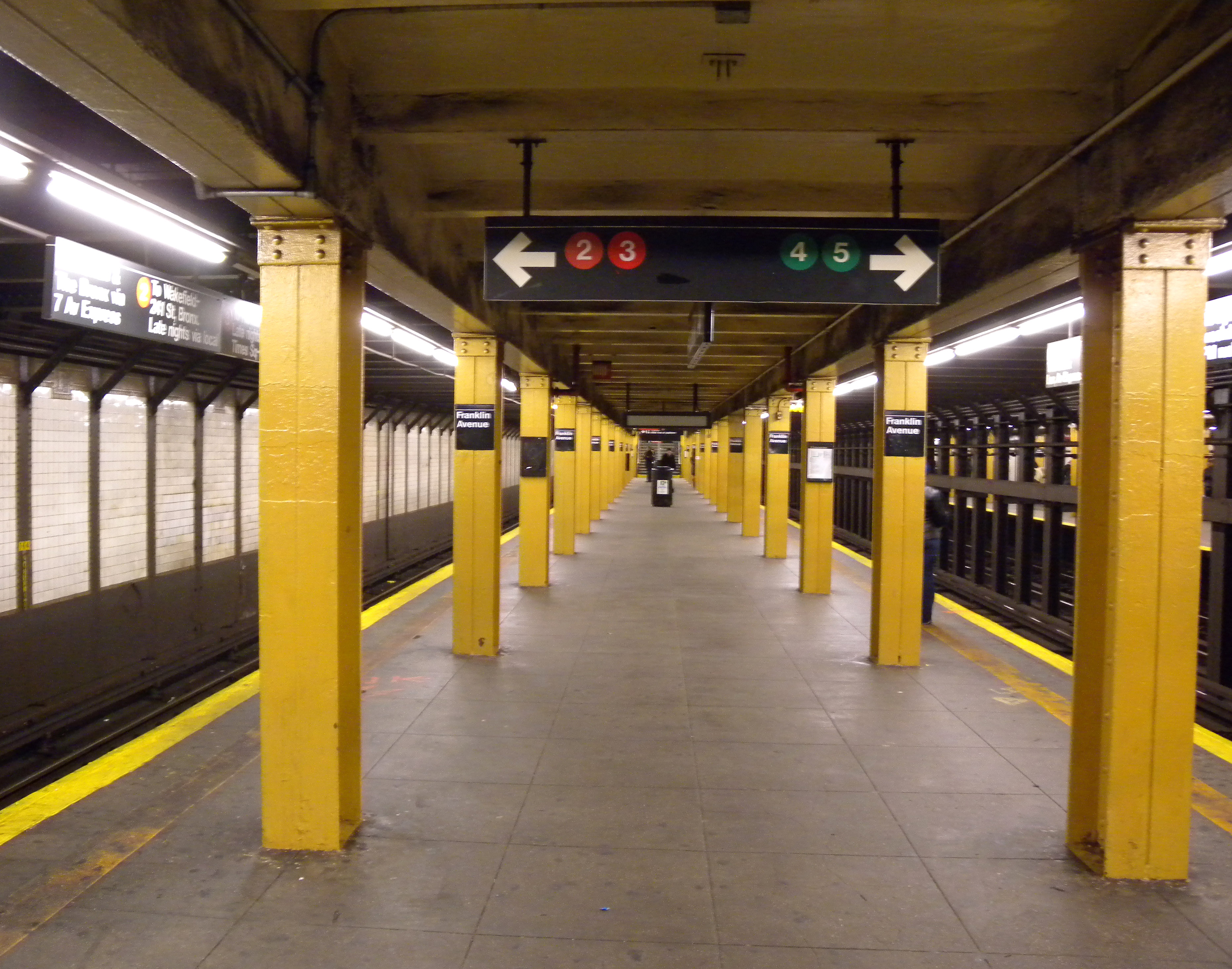
- Northbound platform

Station statistics
- Division: A (IRT)
- Line: IRT Eastern Parkway Line
- Services: 2 (all times); 3 (all except late nights); 4 (all times); 5 (weekdays only)
- Structure: Underground
- Platforms: 2 island platforms cross-platform interchange
- Tracks: 4

Other information
- Opened: August 23, 1920; 106 years ago
- Accessible: No; planned
- Accessibility: Cross-platform transfer available
- Former/other names: Franklin Avenue (1920–2020)
Services
Preceding station	New York City Subway	Following station
Atlantic Avenue–Barclays Center 4 5 via 138th Street–Grand Concourse	Express	Crown Heights–Utica Avenue 4 5 Terminus
Atlantic Avenue–Barclays Center 4 5 via 138th Street–Grand Concourse	Express	President Street–Medgar Evers College 2 5 toward Flatbush Avenue–Brooklyn College
Eastern Parkway–Brooklyn Museum 2 3 4 via 135th Street	Local	President Street–Medgar Evers College 2 5 toward Flatbush Avenue–Brooklyn College
Eastern Parkway–Brooklyn Museum 2 3 4 via 135th Street	Local	Nostrand Avenue 2 3 4 toward New Lots Avenue
Track layout
Station service legend
Symbol	Description
Stops all times except late nights	Stops all times except late nights
Stops all times	Stops all times
Stops late nights only	Stops late nights only
Stops rush hours only	Stops rush hours only
Stops weekdays during the day	Stops weekdays during the day

The Franklin Avenue–Medgar Evers College station (originally Franklin Avenue station) is an underground express station on the IRT Eastern Parkway Line that has four tracks with two island platforms. The 2 and 4 stop here at all times; the 3 stops here at all times except late nights, and the 5 stops here only on weekdays during the day. The 2 and 3 always run local, and the 5 always runs express. The 4 runs express during the day and local during the night. The next stop to the west (railroad north) is Eastern Parkway–Brooklyn Museum for local trains and Atlantic Avenue–Barclays Center for express trains. The next stop to the east (railroad south) is President Street–Medgar Evers College for most 2 and 5 trains, Nostrand Avenue for local 3 and 4 trains as well as limited 2 trains, and Crown Heights–Utica Avenue for express 4 and limited 5 trains.

Both platforms have yellow i-beam columns on both sides at regular intervals with every other one having the standard black station name plate in white lettering. The platform walls have their original Dual Contracts trim line with "F" tablets for "Franklin" at regular intervals. At the extreme west (railroad north) end, the platforms were extended in the 1950s to accommodate the current standard IRT train length of 510 feet. The walls here have a blue trim line with "FRANKLIN AVE" in white sans serif lettering on two lines.

The station's main entrance is a mezzanine above the platforms and tracks at their center. Two staircases from each platform go up to a waiting area that allows a free transfer between directions. Outside of the turnstile bank, there is a token booth and four street stairs to either eastern corners of Franklin Avenue and Eastern Parkway.

The transfer to the Franklin Avenue Shuttle is at the west end of the station. A single staircase from each platform goes up to a mezzanine, where a passageway leads to the north end of the Franklin Avenue-bound platform. A crossover is required to reach the Prospect Park-bound platform.

The station has been adopted by Clara Barton High School as part of New York City Transit's Adopt-A-Station program.

Franklin Avenue, along with the President Street station on the IRT Nostrand Avenue Line, are the two closest stations to the City University of New York's Medgar Evers College. In 2019, a bill to add the college's name to both stations' names was passed in the New York state legislature and signed into law. The name of the Franklin Avenue station was officially changed to Franklin Avenue–Medgar Evers College on October 1, 2020, both to reflect the station's proximity to the college and to honor the college's namesake, civil rights figure Medgar Evers.

=== Gallery ===
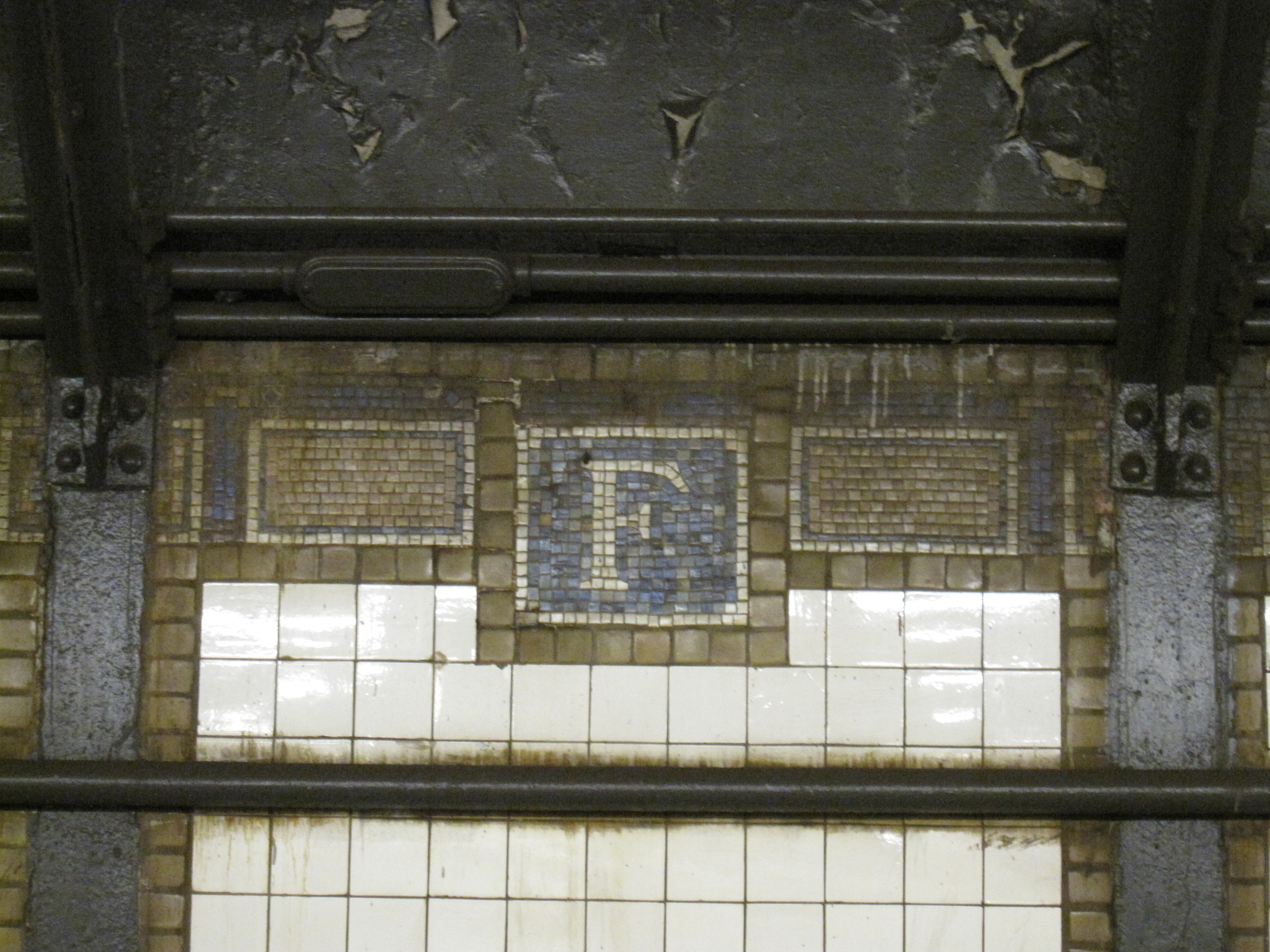
Mosaic frieze

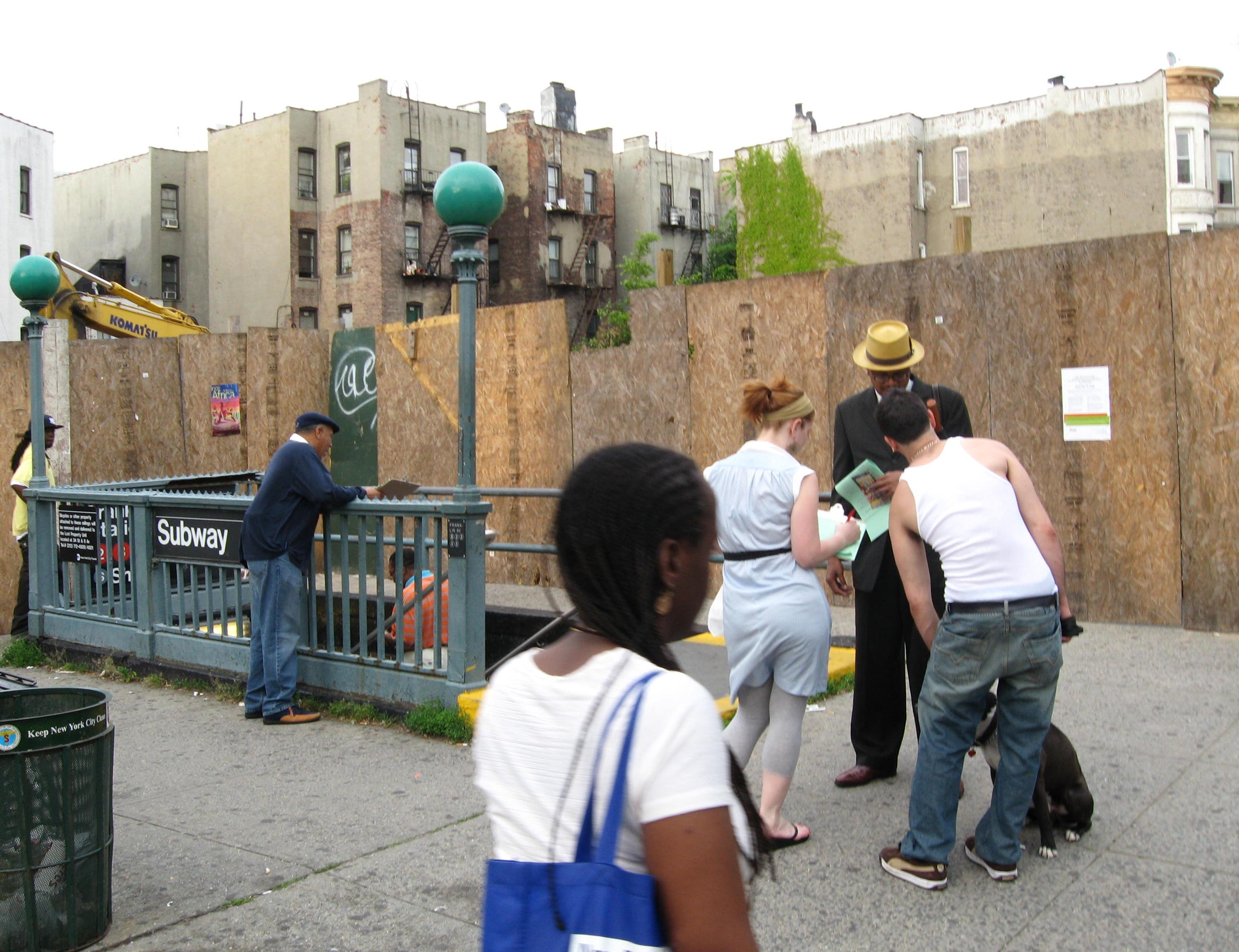
Eastern street stair

== Nostrand Avenue Junction ==
East (railroad south) of the Eastern Parkway Line station is Nostrand Avenue Junction, also known as Rogers Junction, where most 2 and 5 trains diverge to the IRT Nostrand Avenue Line, while 3 and 4 trains as well as limited 2 and 5 trains continue on Eastern Parkway. From west to east between the station and the junction, the northbound local track descends to a lower level directly below the southbound local track. Then, the northbound express track, which is still on the upper level at this point, descends to the lower level directly below the southbound express track, creating a dual level two-over-two track layout.

At the junction, a switch on the upper level allows 5 trains on the southbound express track to change to the local track, and a corresponding switch on the lower level allows 5 trains on the northbound local track to change to the express track. Directly to the east, all of the mainline tracks shift slightly to the north, and the Nostrand Avenue Line splits from the local tracks and head south. There is a closed tower at the south end of the southbound platform.

=== Traffic bottleneck ===
This junction is a severe traffic bottleneck, primarily during rush hours when trains run more frequently, and rebuilding it would require massive construction including the tearing up of Eastern Parkway. The reconstruction of the junction in order to alleviate train congestion has been suggested several times. The plan was first unveiled in the 1967 Transportation Studies for Southeast Brooklyn, and subsequently in 1968 as part of the Program for Action. The MTA's Engineering Department Planning Division considered such a project again in 1972. In 1993, as part of the 1992–1996 Capital Program, the MTA studied seven alternatives for rebuilding the junction. The 1993 study suggested the further scrutiny of two proposals: "Alternative 4", which would simply add a switch on each level east of the Nostrand Avenue Line split, and "Alternative 6", which would reconstruct the junction entirely.

In 2023, as part of its 20-year needs assessment, the MTA suggested removing the bottleneck at the Nostrand Avenue Junction by swapping the southern termini of the 3 and 5. Subsequently, state lawmakers requested that the MTA provide funding to fix the bottleneck. In May 2025, as part of the 2025–2029 Capital Program, the MTA tentatively proposed swapping the 3 and 5 train's termini. A new 8 service, operating along the Broadway–Seventh Avenue Line, would share the southernmost portion of the 3's route with the 5. When the capital plan was approved that June, MTA officials considered instead constructing a switch between the express and local tracks just east of the junction, which would eliminate the need for a new line.
