= Franklin Avenue Shuttle =

New York City Subway shuttle service

- Franklin Avenue Shuttle

- A Franklin Avenue Shuttle train of R68s entering Botanic Garden

- Northern end: Franklin Avenue
- Southern end: Prospect Park
- Stations: 4
- Rolling stock: R68 (Rolling stock assignments subject to change)
- Depot: Coney Island Yard
- Started service: 1878; 148 years ago (predecessor, along with current Q route); 1963; 63 years ago (current shuttle)

The Franklin Avenue Shuttle is a New York City Subway shuttle service that operates in Brooklyn. The shuttle service uses the BMT Franklin Avenue Line exclusively and operates 24 hours a day. The north terminus is Franklin Avenue, with a transfer available to the IND Fulton Street Line. The south terminus is Prospect Park, with a transfer available to the BMT Brighton Line. NYCT Rapid Transit Operations staff refer to it internally as the S, FS or SF. Like the other two shuttles, the 42nd Street Shuttle in Manhattan and the Rockaway Park Shuttle in Queens, its route bullet is colored dark gray on route signs, station signs, rolling stock, and the official subway map.

The S started running along its current route in 1963, and it has had four stations since 1995. Consumers Park was closed in 1928 and replaced by the current Botanic Garden station five blocks to the north. There is a visible clearing at the former station location. Dean Street was closed in 1995 due to low paid fare entrance and extensive fare evasion.

The shuttle runs two 2-car train sets of R68 cars under One Person Train Operation with the motorman also being the conductor. The motorman will go to the opposite end to make another run at each terminal. The northbound and southbound trains usually pass each other at Botanic Garden, the only station on the line to use both tracks. This effectively leaves a passing loop for the northbound train to leave Botanic Garden when the southbound train arrives.

== History ==
=== Early history ===
The current service is co-extensive with the BMT Franklin Avenue Line. It parallels Franklin Avenue, hence the shuttle's name (and the name of the line). It was originally a part of the mainline of what is now the BMT Brighton Line and opened as part of that steam railroad line in 1878.

The Franklin Avenue Line was established as a discrete route on August 1, 1920, when the Brighton Beach mainline was shifted to the new tunnel connecting Prospect Park station with the Fourth Avenue Subway at DeKalb Avenue station. Subway trains from the BRT Broadway Line in Manhattan and elevated trains from Franklin Avenue began sharing operations to Coney Island. The subway operations became the full-time service, and the Franklin Avenue trains provided a variety of scheduled services, based on day of the week, time of day, and even seasonal variations, reverting to shuttle service at other times.

After the city gained ownership of the line in 1940, Brighton–Franklin (labelled 7 by the BMT) services gradually declined. A major blow to through service viability occurred in 1954 when the D train of the IND Division was extended to Coney Island via the Culver Line, depriving the Franklin of a major source of transfer traffic, consisting of passengers from Harlem and the Bronx, who now had a more direct route to Coney Island.

=== Truncation ===
Brighton–Franklin Sunday express service ended after the 1956 summer season, though it continued for several years as a summer-only local. The last through service, on Saturdays, ran on February 16, 1963 in advance of new BMT schedules in effect the next day, resulting in the 7 Franklin Avenue Line becoming a full-time shuttle. On November 1, 1965, when R27s started going into service, this service was named SS, and in 1985, when the practice of using double letters was eliminated, this service became the S. However, some trains from the 1960s to 1980s continued to use the BMT 7 signage.

On December 1, 1974, a southbound shuttle train of R32s was approaching the tunnel portal en route from Franklin Avenue when it derailed on the crossover at Empire Boulevard and smashed into the same place where BRT car 100 had hit in the Malbone Street Wreck. This derailment resulted in some injuries, with R32 car 3668 damaged beyond repair, but there were no fatalities, because time signals limit the speed of trains coming down the hill from Crown Heights.

=== Deterioration and renovation ===
In 1981, the MTA proposed abandoning the service under the failed Program for Action. At the time, only 10,000 passengers used the shuttle per day, and in addition, the Franklin Avenue Line was severely deteriorated. It was proposed that additional B48 bus service along nearby Franklin Avenue could substitute for the line. During the winter, the line would often be closed because there was fear that trains would derail. Stations were in horrible condition; portions of the wooden platforms were sealed off because they had burned or collapsed. In January 1982, the line needed to close for emergency repair work because a retaining wall along the line was in danger of collapse.

In the 1990s, the term "Ghost Train" was coined for the shuttle due to its increasing deterioration. It was shrunk in size to only two cars, and the Dean Street station, which only had 50 paying riders per day, was closed in 1995 due to extensive fare evasion. The entire line was under consideration for abandonment, but community leaders were opposed to the move. They showed up to town hall meetings, news conferences and they sat down with transit officials. They also formed the Committee to Save the Franklin Avenue Shuttle. The coalition included the Straphangers Campaign, a local church, local community boards and the New York City Environmental Justice Alliance. They argued that subway station repair work occurred elsewhere, while no attention was paid to the Franklin Avenue Shuttle.

In the end they convinced the New York State Assembly to force the MTA to rebuild rather than abandon the line, and as a result most of the supporting infrastructure and stations were completely rehabilitated in 18 months, between July 1998 and October 1999 at a cost of $74 million. While the closure of the line started in July 1998, work began in September 1997. During the renovation, a temporary shuttle bus and the B48 bus replaced train service. The line reopened on October 18, 1999, three months ahead of schedule.

As of 2008, the Franklin Avenue Shuttle is the most punctual train in the New York City Subway system with a 99.7 percent on-time average. The shuttle averages 20,000 riders per day.

On June 7, 2024, the MTA announced that the Saint Marks Avenue bridge would be replaced during summer 2024, with no shuttle service on weekends between June 14 and July 8 and between August 9 to September 3. Between July 8 and August 9, northbound trains ended at Park Place, and free shuttle buses replaced service between Park Place and Franklin Avenue-Fulton Street. Full service resumed on August 10, 2024.

Effective December 15, 2024, service on the shuttle was increased, with weekend service beginning to run on an identical schedule with weekday service. Sunday service would run every ten minutes between 7 a.m. and 9 p.m. and every twelve minutes from 9 p.m. to 10 p.m., instead of every fifteen minutes between 7 a.m. and about 9 a.m., every twelve minutes between about 9 a.m. and 9 p.m., and every fifteen minutes between 9 p.m. and 10 p.m.. Saturday headways were decreased from fifteen to twelve minutes during the 6 a.m. to 7 a.m. and 9 p.m. to 10 p.m. hour and from twelve to ten minutes between 6 p.m. and 9 p.m.. In addition, weekday service began running every ten minutes instead of every twelve minutes during the 8 p.m. to 9 p.m. hour.

== Signage history ==
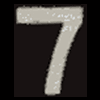
The BMT 7 bullet used on the D Triplex

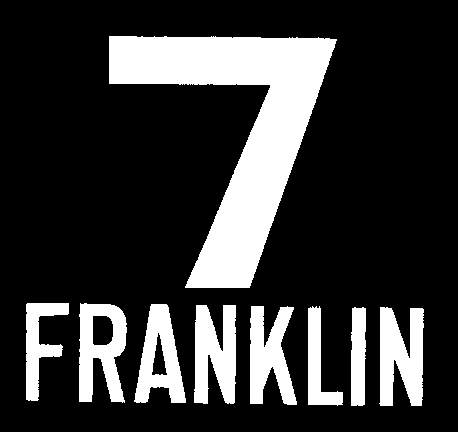
Pre-1967 BMT 7 bullet used on the R1s to R9s

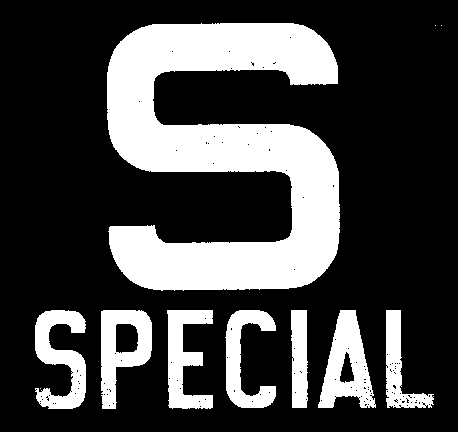
The "S" bullet was used instead of the BMT 7 bullet in the 1960s and 1970s

1967-1968 bullet

1968-1979 bullet

The current bullet used since 1979

An alternate bullet used since 2018, some R68s on the line have this bullet

== Stations ==
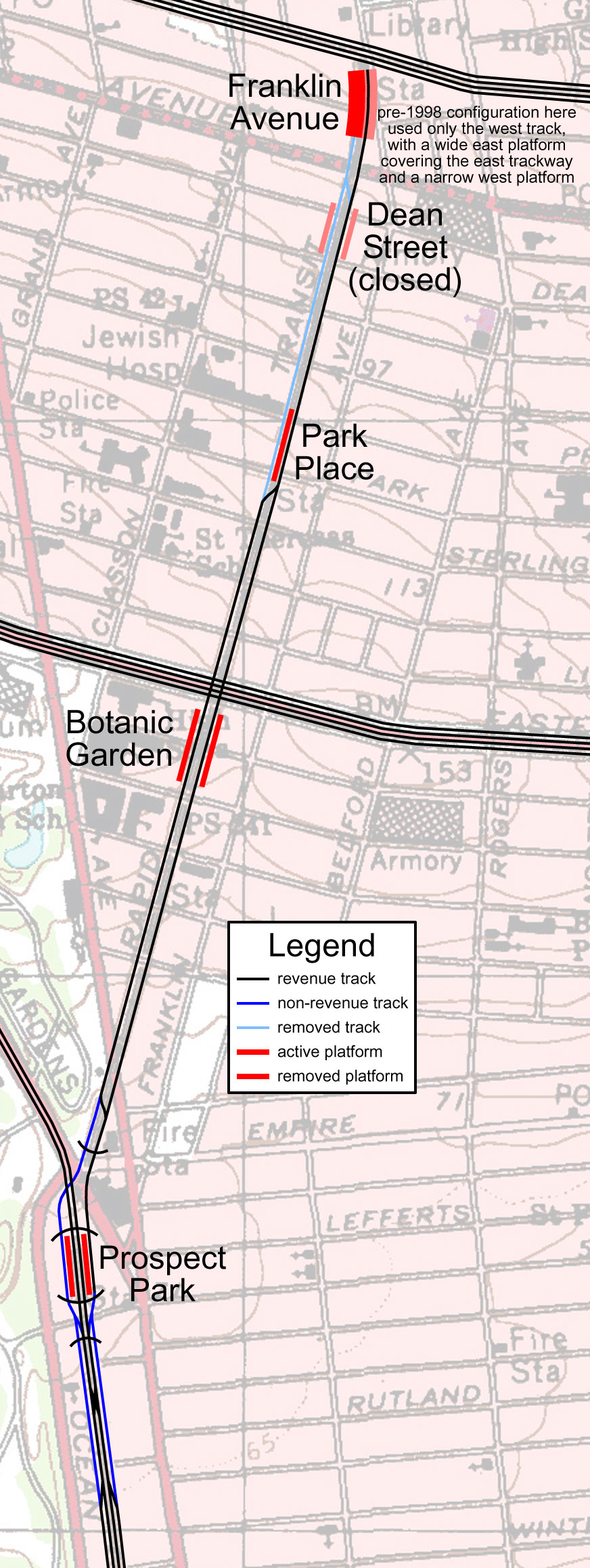
Full track map

For a more detailed station listing, see BMT Franklin Avenue Line.

Station service legend
Stops all times	Stops 24 hours a day
Stops all times except late nights	Stops every day during daytime hours only
Stops late nights only	Stops every day during overnight hours only
Stops weekdays during the day	Stops during weekday daytime hours only
Station closed	Station closed
Time period details
Disabled access	Station is compliant with the Americans with Disabilities Act
↑	Station is compliant with the Americans with Disabilities Act in the indicated direction only
↓	Station is compliant with the Americans with Disabilities Act in the indicated direction only
	Elevator access to mezzanine only

Franklin Avenue Shuttle service	Stations	Disabled access	Subway transfers	Connections
Brooklyn
Franklin Avenue Line
Stops all times	Franklin Avenue	Disabled access	A C (IND Fulton Street Line)	
Stops all times	Park Place	Disabled access		
Stops all times	Botanic Garden		2 3 4 5 (IRT Eastern Parkway Line at Franklin Avenue–Medgar Evers College)	
Stops all times	Prospect Park	Disabled access	B Q (BMT Brighton Line)	
