= B Division (New York City Subway) =

List of New York City Subway services

- (Franklin Avenue Shuttle) (Rockaway Park Shuttle)

Technical
- Track gauge: 4 ft 8 1/2 in (1,435 mm) standard gauge
- Minimum radius: 147.5 ft (44.96 m)
- Electrification: Third rail, 625 V DC

The B Division is a division of the New York City Subway consisting of the lines whose services are designated by letters (A, B, C, D, E, F, G, J, L, M, N, Q, R, W, and Z), as well as the Franklin Avenue and Rockaway Park shuttles. These lines and services were operated by the Brooklyn–Manhattan Transit Corporation (BMT) and city-owned Independent Subway System (IND) prior to the 1940 city takeover of the BMT.

The B Division rolling stock is wider, longer, and heavier than that used on the A Division measuring up to 10 feet (3 m) in width and 75 feet (23 m) in length, compared to 8 feet 7 3/16 inches (2.621 m) in width and 51 feet (16 m) in length for A Division cars, which are limited by the infrastructure's loading gauge.

The B Division is broken down into two subdivisions, B1 (BMT) and B2 (IND), for chaining purposes. The two former systems are still sometimes referred to as the BMT Division and IND Division.

== List of lines ==
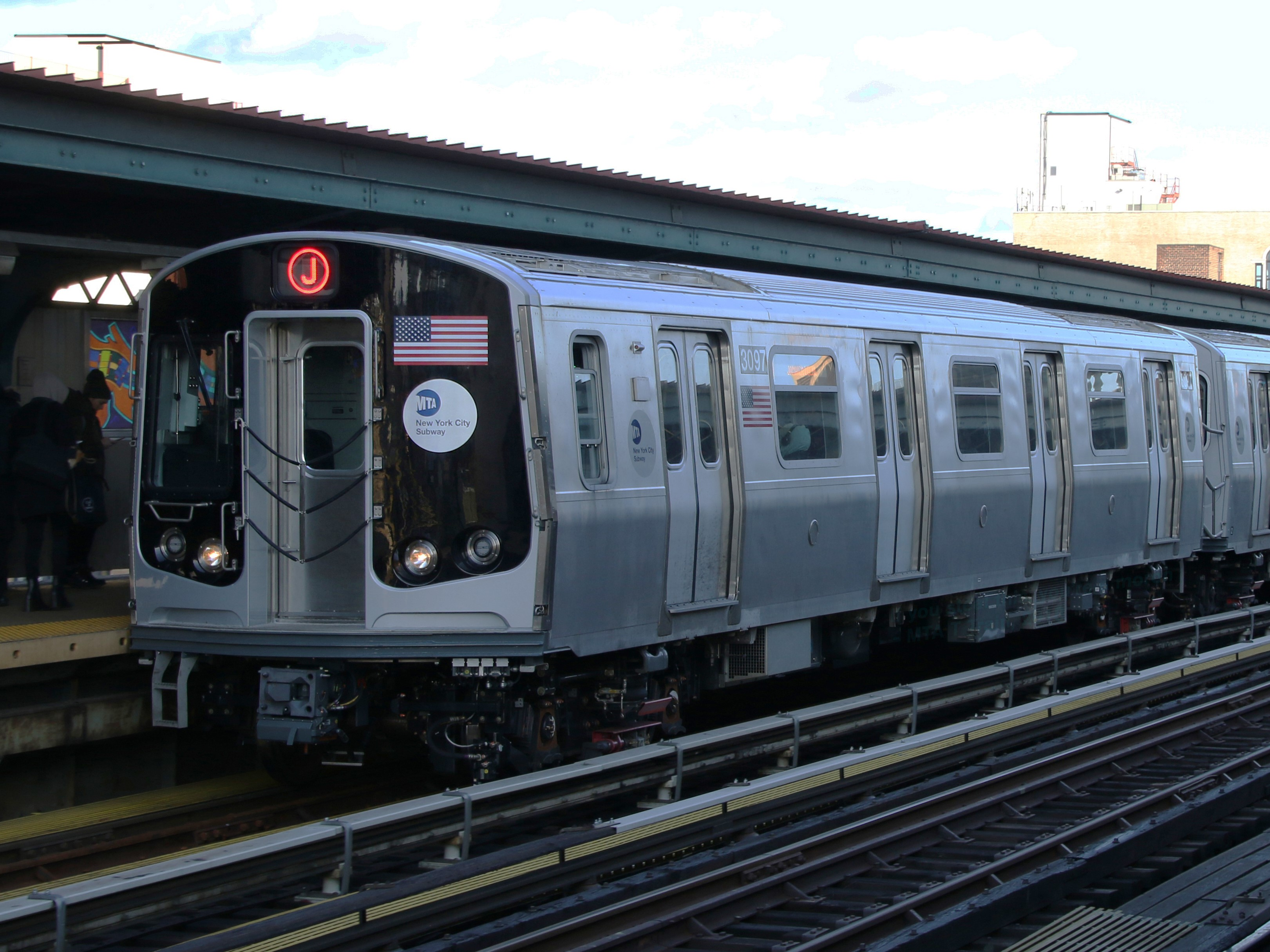
New Technology Train, common on the subway. Note the four sets of doors per car, a feature of all current B Division trains

The following lines are part of the B Division (services shown in parentheses; lines with colors next to them are trunk lines):

Station service legend
Stops all times	Stops 24 hours a day
Stops all times except late nights	Stops every day during daytime hours only
Stops late nights only	Stops every day during overnight hours only
Stops weekdays during the day	Stops during weekday daytime hours only
Stops rush hours only	Stops during weekday rush hours only
Stops rush hours in the peak direction only	Stops during weekday rush hours in the peak direction only
Time period details
Disabled access	Station is compliant with the Americans with Disabilities Act
↑	Station is compliant with the Americans with Disabilities Act in the indicated direction only
↓	Station is compliant with the Americans with Disabilities Act in the indicated direction only
	Elevator access to mezzanine only

- IND Second Avenue Line (N Q R trains)
- BMT Fourth Avenue Line (D N R W trains)
- IND Sixth Avenue Line (B D F <F> M trains)
- IND Eighth Avenue Line (A B C D E trains)
- 60th Street Tunnel Connection (R train)
- BMT 63rd Street Line (N Q R trains)
- IND 63rd Street Line (F M trains)
- BMT Archer Avenue Line (J Z trains)
- IND Archer Avenue Line (E train)
- BMT Astoria Line (N W trains)
- BMT Brighton Line (B Q trains)
- BMT Broadway Line (N Q R W trains)
- BMT Canarsie Line (L train)
- Chrystie Street Connection (B D M trains)
- IND Concourse Line (B D trains)
- IND Crosstown Line (G train)
- IND Culver Line (F <F> G trains)
- BMT Franklin Avenue Shuttle (S train)
- IND Fulton Street Line (A C trains)
- BMT Jamaica Line (J M Z trains)
- BMT Myrtle Avenue Line (M train)
- BMT Nassau Street Line (J M Z trains)
- IND Queens Boulevard Line (E F <F> M R trains)
- IND Rockaway Line (A S trains)
- BMT Sea Beach Line (N W trains)
- BMT West End Line (D R W trains)

== History ==
=== Early history ===
The oldest line to become part of the B Division was the BMT Lexington Avenue Line, opened in 1885. A large system of elevated railways in Brooklyn was formed by 1908 by the Brooklyn Rapid Transit Company (BRT), crossing the Brooklyn Bridge and Williamsburg Bridge to Manhattan terminals. With the Dual Contracts, signed in 1913, the BRT acquired extensions outward into Queens, as well as through Lower and Midtown Manhattan. The BRT became the Brooklyn–Manhattan Transit Corporation in 1923 after a bankruptcy.

The Independent Subway System (IND) was created by the city in the 1920s and 1930s as a third system, operated by the city, competing with the BMT and Interborough Rapid Transit Company (IRT). The city took over operations of the BMT and IRT in 1940, consolidating ownership of the three systems into one. Since the original IRT tunnels were smaller, it has remained a separate division to this day.

=== IND before 1967 ===
IND services were labeled on maps and signs starting with the opening of the first line in 1932. Six letters—A to F—were assigned to the major services, sorted by the north terminal and midtown line, and express services had single letters, while local services had double letters. G and H were assigned to lesser services, which did not enter Manhattan. The following labels were used from 1940 to 1967:

	Name	North end/type
A	Eighth Avenue Express (all times)	Washington Heights
AA	Eighth Avenue Local (non-rush hours)	Washington Heights
BB	Sixth Avenue Local (weekday rush hours)	Washington Heights
CC	Eighth Avenue Local (weekday rush hours)	Concourse
D	Sixth Avenue-Houston Street Express (all times)	Concourse
E	Eighth Avenue Express (all times; to Rockaway weekday rush hours starting in 1956)	Queens-Jamaica
F	Sixth Avenue Express (all times)	Queens-Jamaica
GG	Crosstown Local (all times)	Brooklyn-Queens
HH	Fulton Street Local (discontinued in 1946)	N/A
HH	Rockaway Local (non-rush hours; began in 1956)	N/A

=== Consolidation of operations ===
Until 1954 and 1955, when the Culver Ramp and 60th Street Tunnel Connection opened, the BMT and IND trackage was not connected. The early joint services using these connections operated similarly to trackage rights; it was not until the Chrystie Street Connection opened in 1967 that the ex-BMT and IND systems were consolidated operationally.

Beginning in 1924, BMT services were designated by number. The city assigned letters (J and up)—generally following the IND pattern of double letters for local services—in the early 1960s to prepare for the 1967 Chrystie Street Connection. Only Southern Division routes (1–4 or N–T) were labeled on maps, but all services except remnants of the old els were assigned letters:

Old	New	Name
1	Q	Brighton Express via Bridge (weekdays)
1	QB	Brighton Local via Bridge (other times)
1	QT	Brighton Local via Tunnel (weekdays)
1	QJ	Brighton-Nassau Loop via Tunnel (Weekdays)
2	RR	Fourth Avenue Local via Tunnel (all times)
2	RJ	Fourth Avenue-Nassau Loop via Bridge (rush hour Special)
3	T	West End Express via Bridge (weekday rush hours and Saturday)
3	TT	West End Local via Tunnel (weekdays; shuttle in Brooklyn at other times)
4	N	Sea Beach Express via Bridge (all times)
5	N/A	Culver Shuttle (all times)
6	N/A	Fifth Avenue-Bay Ridge Line (abandoned in 1940)
7	SS	Franklin Avenue Line (all times)
8	N/A	Astoria Line (all times)
9	N/A	Flushing Line (discontinued in 1949; became all IRT)
10	M	Myrtle Express (weekday rush hours)
11	MJ	Myrtle Local (all times)
12	N/A	Lexington Avenue Line (abandoned in 1950)
13	N/A	Fulton Street Line (Brooklyn portions abandoned in 1940 and 1956; Queens portion became IND)
14	KK	Broadway Brooklyn Local (weekday rush hours)
15	J	Jamaica Express (weekday rush hours)
15	JJ	Jamaica Local (all times except weekday rush hours)
16	L	14th Street Express (never ran)
16	LL	14th Street Local (all times)

* Unofficially signed as "M", or sometimes "S".

In 1967, the Culver and Franklin Shuttles became SS—the standard shuttle designation—and the Myrtle Local ("Myrtle (Jay)"), discontinued in 1969) was labeled MJ.

=== After 1967 ===
The 1967 opening of the Chrystie Street Connection resulted in a number of changes. The following services have been operated since then:

- A Eighth Avenue Express, 1967–present
- B Sixth Avenue Express, 1967–present
- C Eighth Avenue Local, 1967–present (CC until 1985)
- D Sixth Avenue Express, 1967–present
- E Eighth Avenue Local, 1967–present
- EE Broadway Local, 1967–1976
- F Sixth Avenue Local, 1967–present
- G Brooklyn-Queens Crosstown Local, 1967–present (GG until 1985)
- J Nassau Street Express, 1967–present (QJ until 1973)
- K Broadway Brooklyn Local, 1967–1976 (JJ from 1967 to 1968; KK from 1968 to 1973)
- K Eighth Avenue Local, 1985-1988 (AA from 1967 to 1985)
- L 14th Street-Canarsie Local, 1967–present (LL until 1985)
- M Nassau Street Local, 1967–2010; Sixth Ave Local, 2010–present
- MJ Myrtle Avenue Local, 1967–1969
- N Broadway Express, 1967–present
- NX Broadway Express, 1967–1968
- Q Broadway Express, 1967–present (QB until 1985)
- R Broadway Local, 1967–present (RR until 1985)
- RJ Nassau Street Local, 1967–1968
- S Franklin Avenue Shuttle, 1967–present (SS until 1985)
- S Rockaway Park Shuttle, 1967–1972, 1985–present (HH from 1967 to 1972 and H from 1985 to 1992 and 2012–2013; part of the A and CC in between)
- SS Culver Shuttle, 1967–1975
- TT West End Shuttle, 1967–1968
- V Sixth Avenue Local, 2001–2010
- W Broadway Local, 2001–2010, 2016–present
- Z Nassau Street Express, 1988–present

== See also ==
- A Division
- Brooklyn–Manhattan Transit Corporation
- Independent Subway System
- Interborough Rapid Transit Company
