= Parkside Avenue station =

New York City Subway station in Brooklyn

Parkside Avenue
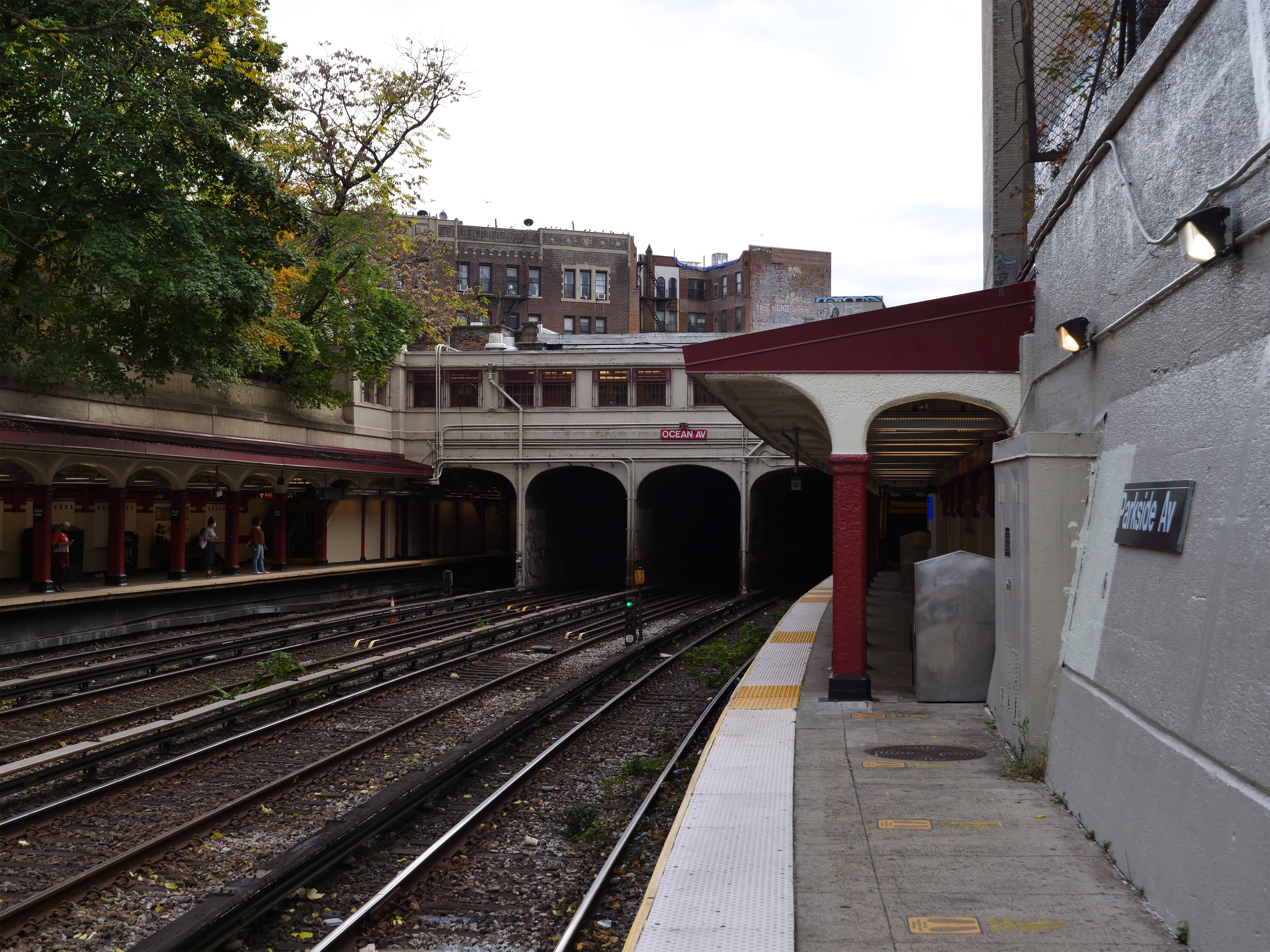

Station statistics
- Address: Parkside Avenue & Ocean Avenue; Brooklyn, New York
- Borough: Brooklyn
- Locale: Prospect Lefferts Gardens, Flatbush
- Coordinates: 40.65535°N 73.961651°W
- Division: B (BMT)
- Line: BMT Brighton Line
- Services: Q (all times)
- Transit: NYCT Bus: B12, B16
- Structure: Open-cut / Underground
- Platforms: 2 side platforms
- Tracks: 4

Other information
- Opened: before 1895
- Rebuilt: current station: 1919; 107 years ago
- Former/other names: Woodruff Avenue

Traffic
- 2025: 1,653,753 ▲10.6%
- Rank: 212 out of 423
Services
Preceding station	New York City Subway	Following station
Prospect Park toward 96th Street	Local	Church Avenue toward Coney Island–Stillwell Avenue
does not stop here
Location
Location within New York City Subway
Location within New York City
Location within New York
Track layout
Street map
Station service legend
Symbol	Description
Stops all times	Stops all times

The Parkside Avenue station is a local station on the BMT Brighton Line of the New York City Subway. It is located at Parkside Avenue and Ocean Avenue in Flatbush, Brooklyn. The station is served by the Q train at all times.

== History ==
This station was originally built sometime before 1895 by the Brooklyn and Brighton Beach Railroad as Flatbush station. Through a series of mergers and acquisitions, it was acquired by the Brooklyn Rapid Transit Company, and reopened in 1905 as a two-track station named Woodruff Avenue.

On June 20, 1917, the New York State Public Service Commission approved a resolution directing the New York Municipal Railway to construct an additional exit staircase from the proposed station's southbound platform to Ocean Avenue north of Woodruff Avenue.

This portion of the line was rebuilt from a two-track open cut to a four-track open cut in 1919.

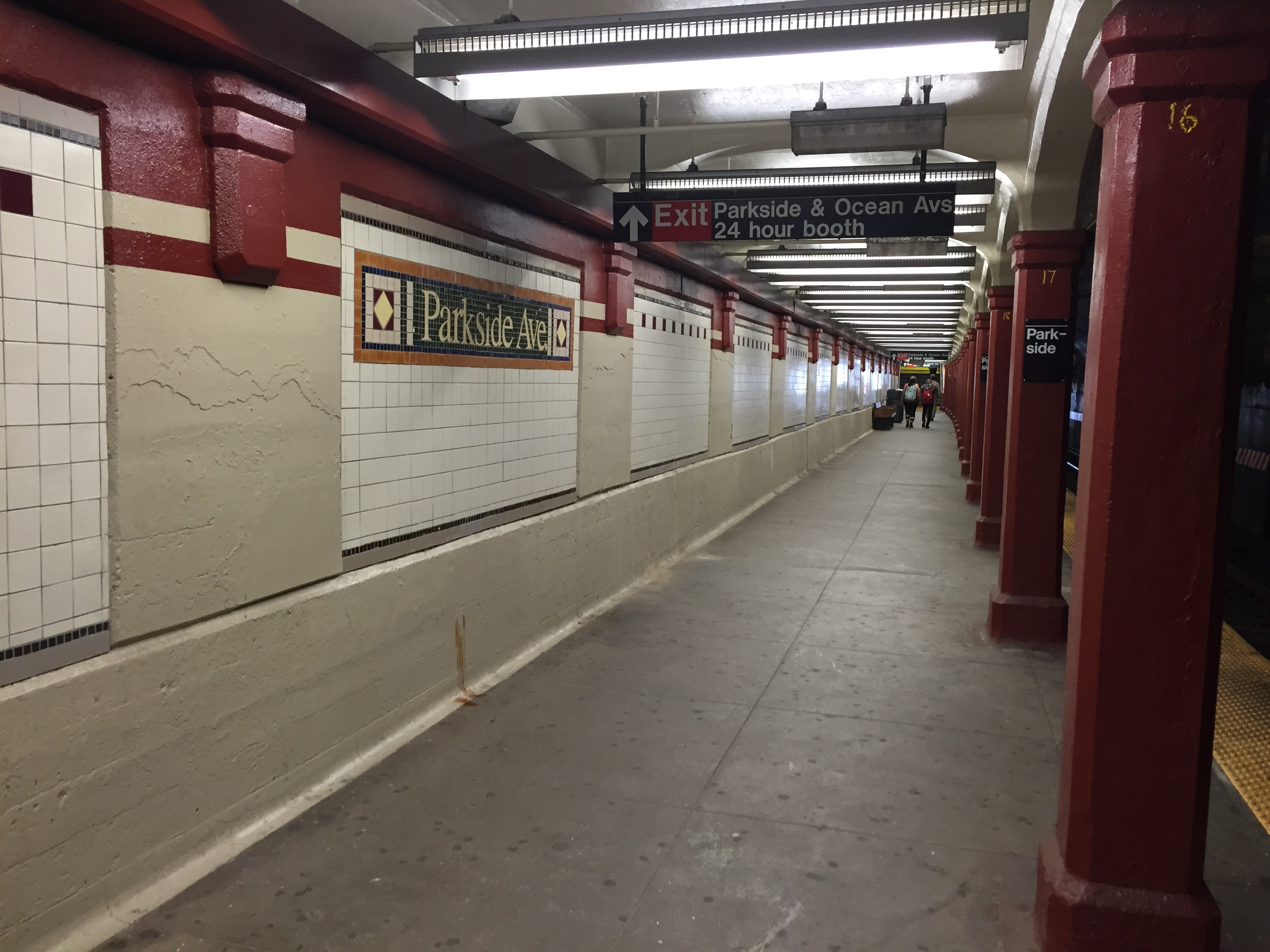
Tunnel section

On August 1, 1920, a tunnel under Flatbush Avenue opened, connecting the Brighton Line to the Broadway subway in Manhattan. At the same time, the line's former track connections to the Fulton Street Elevated were severed. Subway trains from Manhattan and elevated trains from Franklin Avenue served Brighton Line stations, sharing the line to Coney Island.

During the 1964–1965 fiscal year, the platforms at Parkside Avenue, along with those at six other stations on the Brighton Line, were lengthened to 615 feet (187 m) to accommodate a ten-car train of 60 foot (18 m)-long cars, or a nine-car train of 67 foot (20 m)-long cars.

In April 1993, the New York State Legislature agreed to give the MTA $9.6 billion for capital improvements. Some of the funds would be used to renovate nearly one hundred New York City Subway stations, including Parkside Avenue. The renovation was completed in 1996.

In May 2015, the Parkside Plaza was established outside the station's main entrance at Parkside and Ocean Avenue. The Plaza features plants, chairs, tables and umbrellas, and it serves as a local gathering space and venue for events and outdoor markets. Local residents had worked for years to create the plaza upon what had previously been a large and underused strip of sidewalk.

== Station layout ==
This station currently has four tracks and two side platforms. The two center express tracks are used by the B train when it operates on weekdays.

The original southern two-thirds of the platforms are in a tunnel underneath cross streets and buildings, while the remaining northern one third is in an open cut. The extreme north ends of the platforms, which were extensions built in the 1960s, have no canopies and curve to the north. The southbound platform has its concrete wall painted beige while the northbound one is carved within the Earth's crust. Here, the station signs are the standard black plates in white lettering. The rest of the open cut has a concrete canopy with dark grey columns. The remainder of the platforms in the tunnel have dark grey columns and a red trim line and mosaic name tablets reading "PARKSIDE AVE." in gold serif font surrounded by diamonds.

The 1994 artwork here is called Brighton Clay Re-Leaf by Susan Tunick. It features ceramic tiles portraying leaves in the station house within fare control. This artwork can also be found at the Prospect Park station.

=== Exits ===
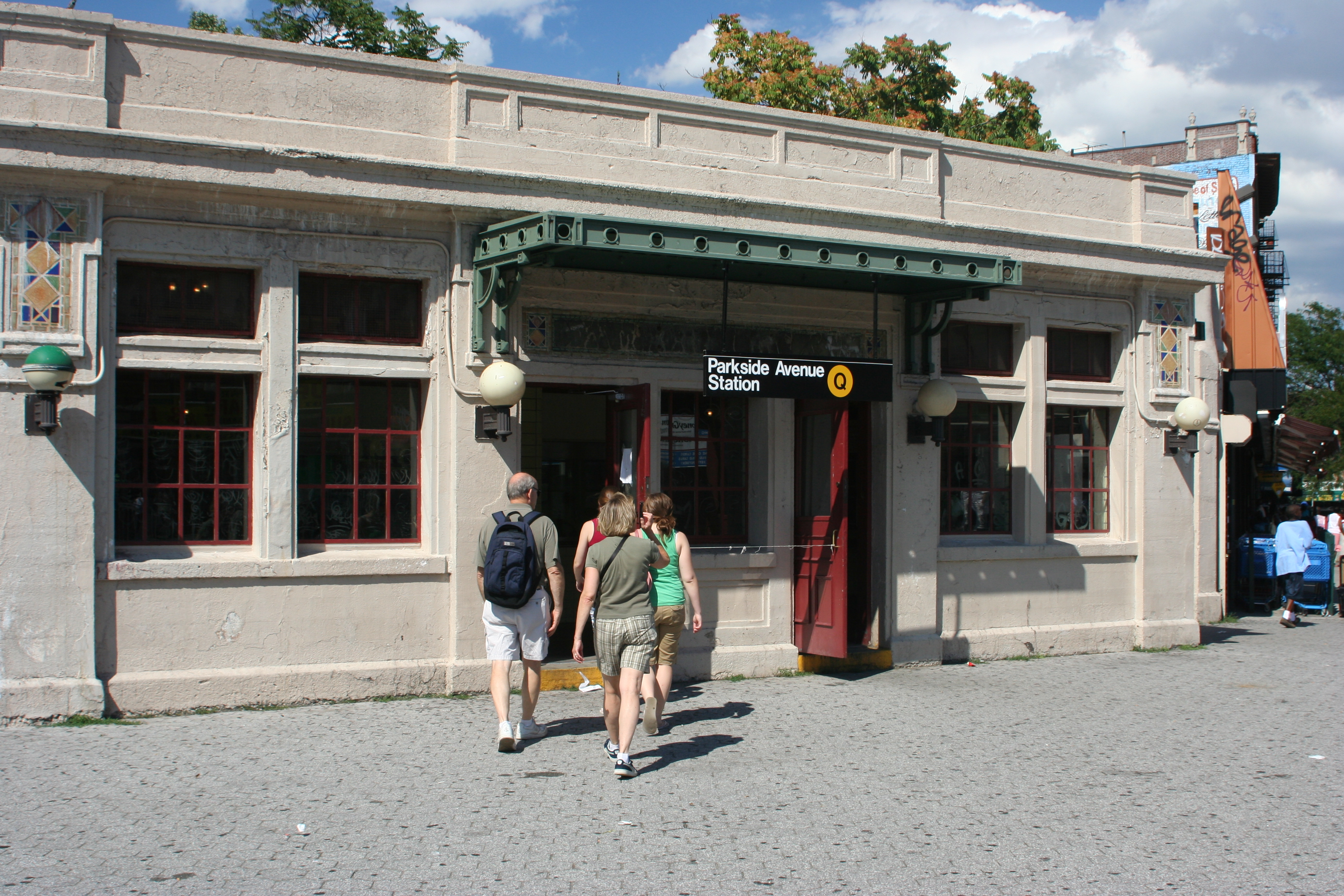
Station entrance

The station's main entrance/exit is a street level station house on the northern end of the tunnel above the platforms and tracks. Two staircases from each platform go up to a waiting area/crossover, where a turnstile bank provides entrance/exit from the system. Outside fare control, there is a token booth and two sets of doors, one leading to Parkside Avenue and Ocean Avenue and the other to the southern entrance of Prospect Park.

The Coney Island-bound platform has an exit-only at the extreme south end. A single platform-level turnstile leads to a short tunnel, where a staircase goes up to the southwest corner of Woodruff and Ocean Avenues. The extreme south end of the Manhattan-bound platform has an employee-only facility.
