= Prospect Park station (BMT lines) =

New York City Subway station in Brooklyn

Prospect Park
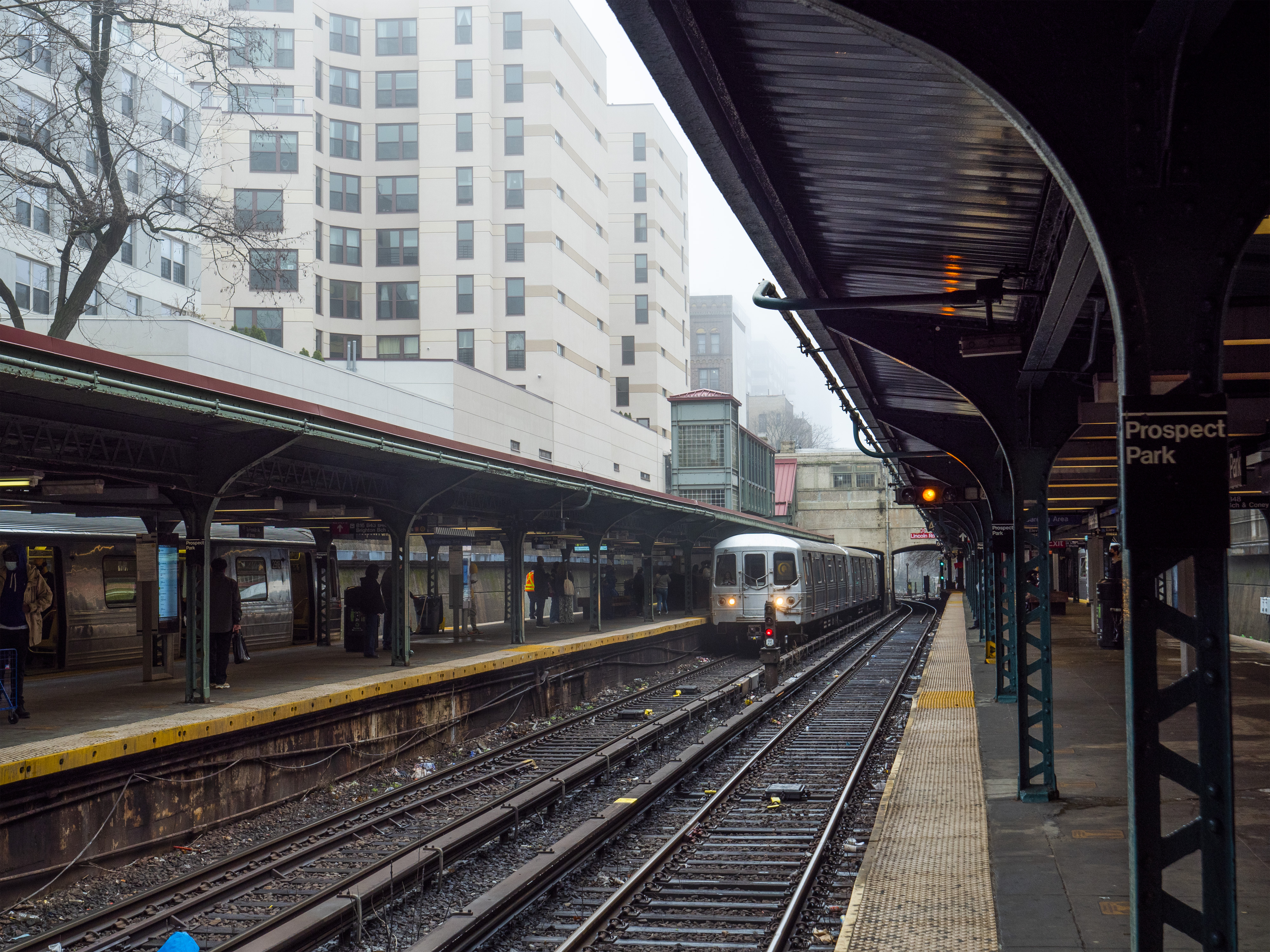
- A northbound R46 Q train arriving

Station statistics
- Address: Empire Boulevard & Flatbush Avenue; Brooklyn, New York
- Borough: Brooklyn
- Locale: Flatbush, Prospect Lefferts Gardens, Crown Heights
- Coordinates: 40.661507°N 73.962461°W
- Division: B (BMT)
- Line: BMT Brighton Line; BMT Franklin Avenue Line
- Services: B (weekday rush hours, middays and early evenings); Q (all times); S (all times)
- Transit: NYCT Bus: B16, B41, B43, B48
- Structure: Open-cut
- Platforms: 2 island platforms cross-platform interchange
- Tracks: 4 (3 in regular service)

Other information
- Opened: July 2, 1878; 148 years ago
- Rebuilt: current station: 1919; 107 years ago
- Accessible: Yes

Traffic
- 2025: 2,429,054 ▲11.4%
- Rank: 153 out of 423
Services
Preceding station	New York City Subway	Following station
Seventh Avenue B Q via DeKalb Avenue	Express	Church Avenue B toward Brighton Beach
Seventh Avenue B Q via DeKalb Avenue	Local	Parkside Avenue Q toward Coney Island–Stillwell Avenue
Botanic Garden S toward Franklin Avenue	Franklin Avenue	Terminus
Location
Location within New York City Subway
Location within New York City
Location within New York
Track layout
Street map
Station service legend
Symbol	Description
Stops all times	Stops all times
Stops weekdays during the day	Stops weekdays during the day

The Prospect Park station is an express station on the BMT Brighton Line of the New York City Subway. It is located in between Lincoln Road, Lefferts Avenue, Empire Boulevard, Ocean Avenue and Flatbush Avenue in Flatbush, Brooklyn, near the border of Crown Heights. Prospect Lefferts Gardens, which is a subsection of Flatbush, is adjacent to the station. The station, which serves Prospect Park and Brooklyn Botanic Garden, is served by the Q train and Franklin Avenue Shuttle at all times and by the B train on weekdays.

== History ==
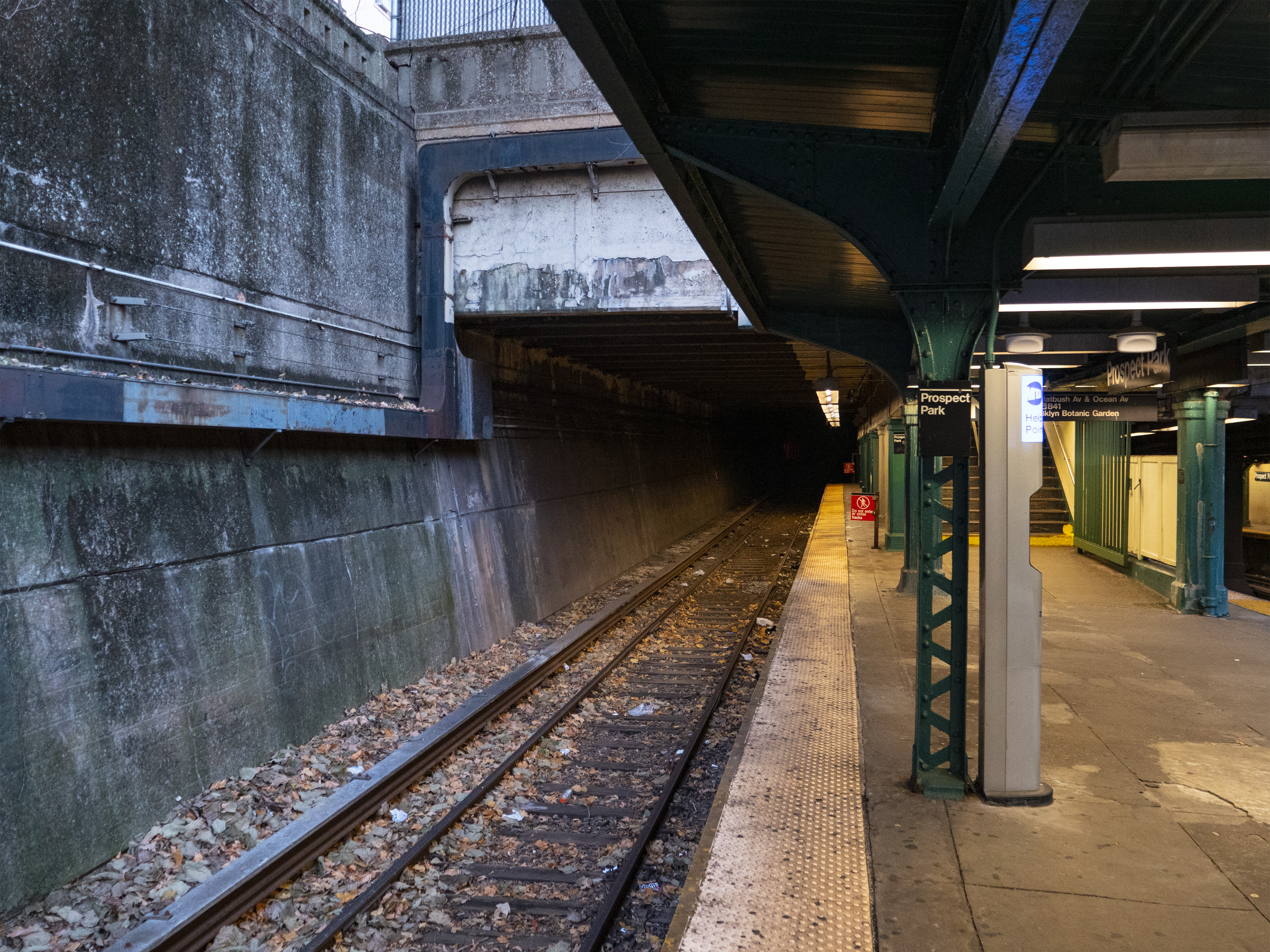
The Malbone Street Tunnel on the southbound local track

This station opened on July 2, 1878 when the Brooklyn, Flatbush and Coney Island Railway established it as the Brighton Line's temporary northern terminus on what was then known as the Willink Entrance to Prospect Park. On August 18, 1878, the line was completed north to Bedford Terminal with a connection to the Long Island Rail Road.

In 1918, the station began a rebuilding in order to accommodate the new subway connection to the Manhattan Bridge and Montague Street Tunnel. This rebuilding contributed to the Malbone Street wreck on November 1 of that year, when a train of elevated cars derailed on the then-new curve leading to what is now the unused southbound outer track. At least 93 individuals died, making it one of the U.S.'s deadliest train crashes.

On August 1, 1920, a tunnel under Flatbush Avenue opened, connecting the Brighton Line to the Broadway subway in Manhattan. At the same time, the line's former track connections to the Fulton Street Elevated were severed. Subway trains from Manhattan and elevated trains from Franklin Avenue served Brighton Line stations, sharing the line to Coney Island. To the south of this station, express service operated on the Brighton Line.

The Prospect Park station was the closest station to Ebbets Field, home of the Brooklyn Dodgers until the team moved to Los Angeles after the 1957 season. The stadium was located at Bedford Avenue and Sullivan Place three blocks to the east and one block to the north. That area is now occupied by the Ebbets Field Apartments.

In April 1993, the New York State Legislature agreed to give the MTA $9.6 billion for capital improvements. Some of the funds would be used to renovate nearly one hundred New York City Subway stations, including Prospect Park. The MTA conducted a $12 million renovation of the Prospect Park station in the mid-1990s. The first phase of the renovation took place from November 1992 to August 1994; it included restoring the station's tiled friezes and yellow-tile walls, as well as restoring the entrance at Empire Boulevard, adding a decorative gate alluding to the Prospect Park Zoo. The second phase included renovating the Lincoln Road entrance. The renovation was completed in 1996. In 1999, the MTA leased the space above the Lincoln Road entrance to a nursery school that planned to renovate the space for $600,000.

This station was the site of an October 15, 2008, NYPD arrest in which it was alleged that the suspect had been sodomized, leading to both criminal action and a lawsuit against the NYPD. All of the officers involved were acquitted and the lawsuit thrown out. In November 2019, officials installed a bronze memorial plaque at the Prospect Park station's northern exit in commemoration of the Malbone Street Wreck.

== Station layout ==
This open cut station has four tracks and two island platforms. Both platforms have red canopies with green frames and support columns that run for the either length. Every other column has the standard black station name plate in white lettering.

The station is served by the Q train and the Franklin Avenue Shuttle at all times, and by the B train only on weekdays during the day. The center express tracks are used by B and Q trains. The northbound local track is used to originate and terminate the shuttle, as the station is its southern terminus. The southbound local track is only used for train storage or construction reroutes. The next stop to the north is Seventh Avenue for B and Q trains and Botanic Garden for the shuttle. The next stop to the south is Parkside Avenue for local Q trains and Church Avenue for express B trains.

At the north end of the station, B and Q trains ramp down into a tunnel under Flatbush Avenue, running parallel to the IRT Eastern Parkway Line before merging with the BMT Fourth Avenue Line at DeKalb Avenue while the shuttle curves to the northeast and becomes an open cut route after a short tunnel towards Franklin Avenue. The platforms are split into two sections at this end separated by a beige concrete wall.

At the south end of the station, there are crossovers and switches as the Brighton Line becomes a four-track corridor to Ocean Parkway. B trains stay on the express track and run to Brighton Beach; Q trains switch to the local track and run to Coney Island–Stillwell Avenue.

=== Artwork ===
The 1994 artwork here is called Brighton Clay Re-Leaf by Susan Tunick. It features ceramic tiles in both station entrances/exits that depict leaves to symbolize Prospect Park. This artwork is also at Parkside Avenue.

=== Exits ===
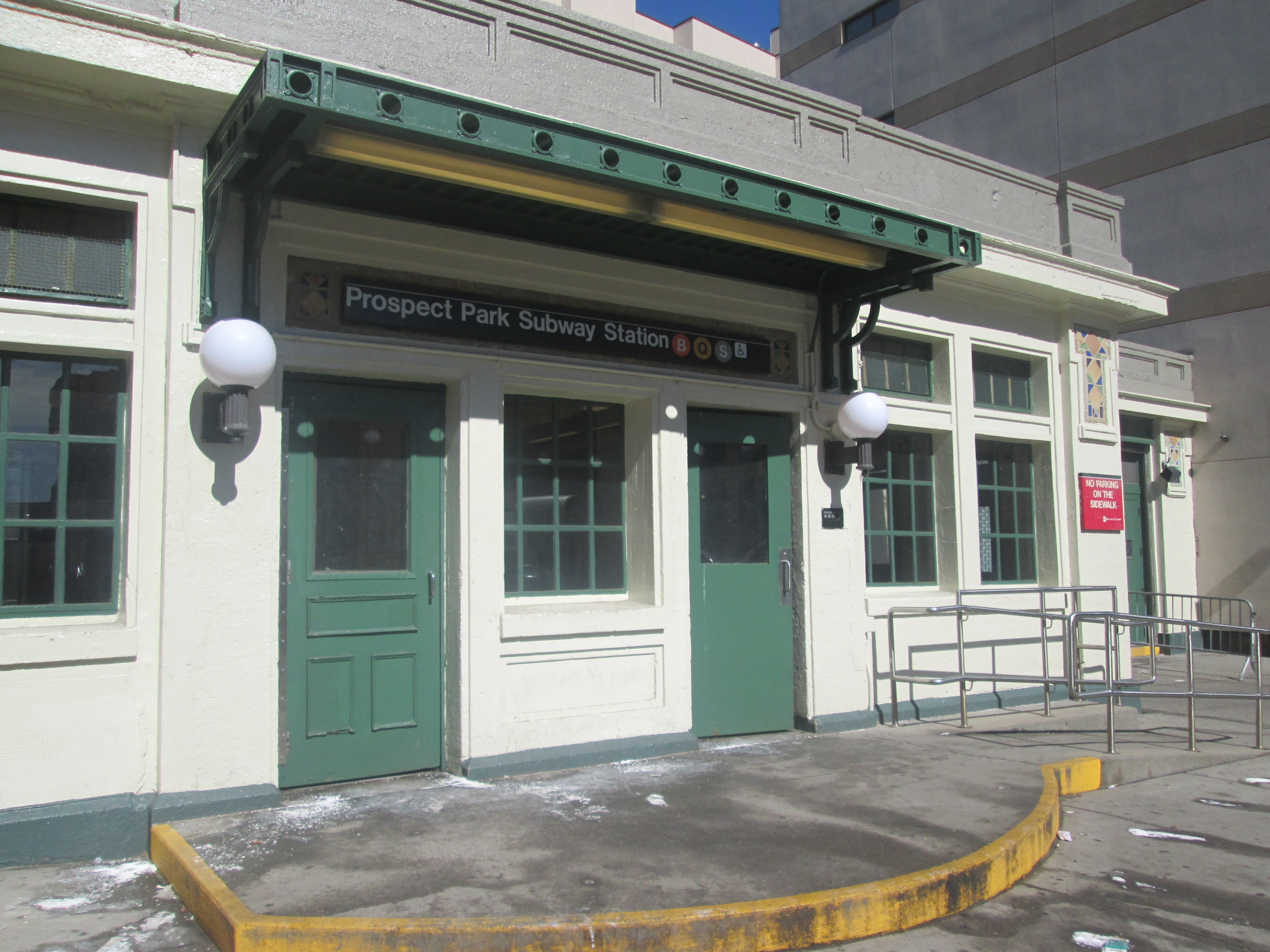
Station entrance at Lincoln Road on the south end

The station has two entrances/exits. The full-time one is at the extreme south end. A single double-wide staircase and ADA-accessible elevators go up from each platform to a beige ground level station house that is on the north side of the Lincoln Road overpass above the platforms between Ocean and Flatbush Avenues. Each platform elevator is connected to the station house by a glass-enclosed passageway above their respective platforms. There is a bank of turnstiles, a waiting area that allows a free transfer between directions and a token booth inside the station house. Additionally, there is a private preschool immediately adjacent to the station house entrance.

The station's other entrance/exit at the north end is un-staffed. Two staircases from each platform at the tunnel portal go up to a waiting area, where a bank of turnstiles and one exit-only turnstile lead to a mezzanine that had its part-time token booth removed in 2010. Outside fare control, a single staircase goes up to a small plaza with an ornate fence between two buildings on the west side of Flatbush Avenue between Ocean and Lefferts Avenues. Diagonally across the intersection from the exit is the southwest entrance of the Brooklyn Botanic Garden. An inscribed bronze plaque to the Malbone Street Wreck, installed in 2019, is located on the wall outside the northern exit.
