= Beverley Road station =

New York City Subway station in Brooklyn

Beverley Road
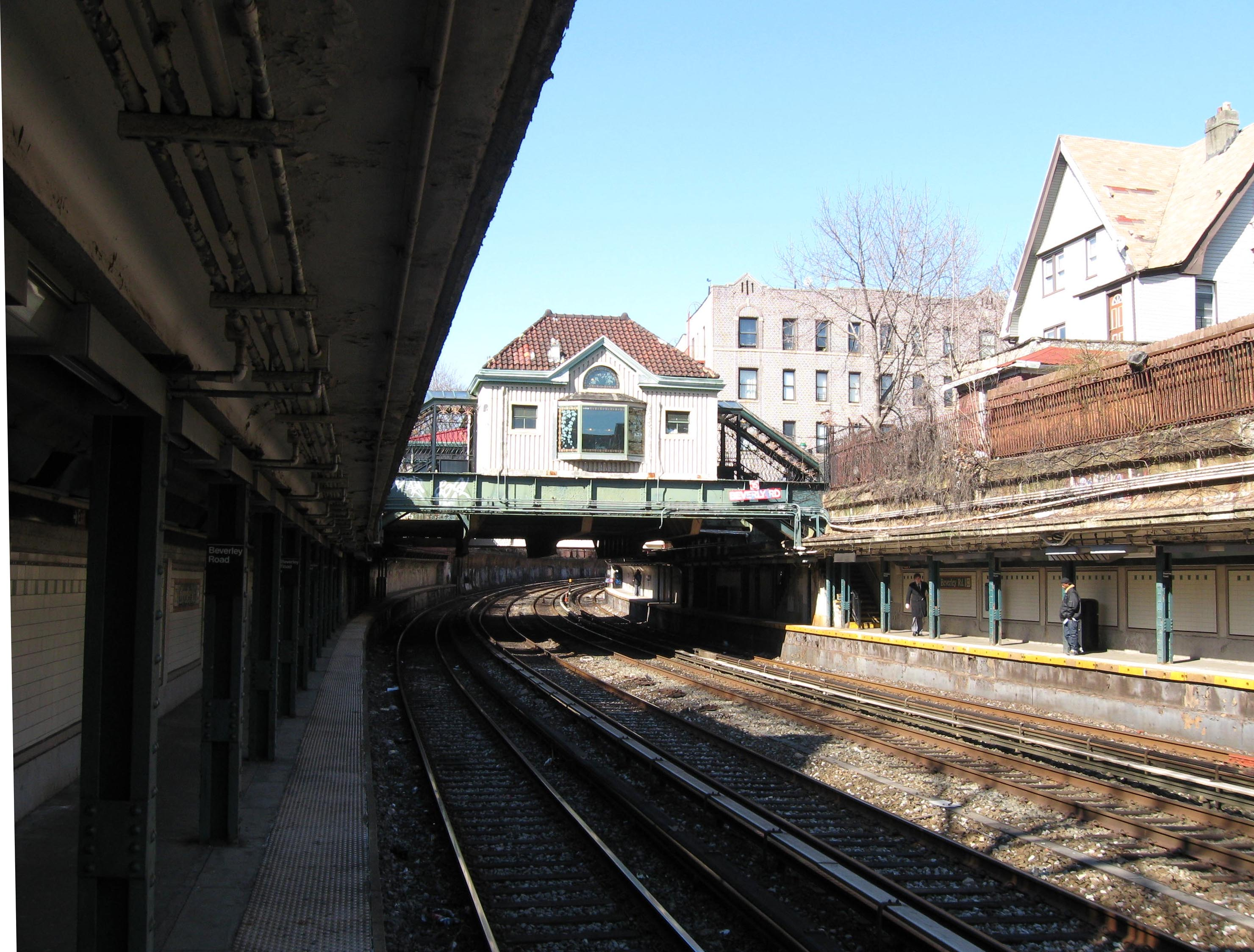
- Looking north towards the station house from the Coney Island-bound platform

Station statistics
- Address: Beverley Road & East 16th Street; Brooklyn, New York
- Borough: Brooklyn
- Locale: Ditmas Park, Flatbush
- Coordinates: 40.644625°N 73.964472°W
- Division: B (BMT)
- Line: BMT Brighton Line
- Services: Q (all times)
- Structure: Open-cut
- Platforms: 2 side platforms
- Tracks: 4

Other information
- Opened: original station: c. 1900
- Rebuilt: current station: 1907; 119 years ago

Traffic
- 2025: 961,457 ▲7.3%
- Rank: 318 out of 423
Services
Preceding station	New York City Subway	Following station
Church Avenue toward 96th Street	Local	Cortelyou Road toward Coney Island–Stillwell Avenue
does not stop here
Location
Location within New York City Subway
Location within New York City
Location within New York
Track layout
Street map
Station service legend
Symbol	Description
Stops all times	Stops all times
- Beverley Road Subway Station (BRT pre-Dual System)
- U.S. National Register of Historic Places
- New York State Register of Historic Places
- MPS: New York City Subway System MPS
- NRHP reference No.: 04001024
- NYSRHP No.: 04701.013850

Significant dates
- Added to NRHP: July 17, 2004
- Designated NYSRHP: July 20, 2004

The Beverley Road station is a local station on the BMT Brighton Line of the New York City Subway. It is located over a private right-of-way at Beverley Road between Marlborough Road/East 15th Street and East 16th Street in the neighborhood of Flatbush, Brooklyn. The station is served by the Q train at all times.

== History ==
The original station at this location was opened around 1900 as a two-track street-level side platform station running south from a grade crossing at Beverley Road. The station was established to serve the then-new upscale planned community of Prospect Park South. The current station house and below-grade platforms were completed at the end of 1907.

On August 1, 1920, a tunnel under Flatbush Avenue opened, connecting the Brighton Line to the Broadway subway in Manhattan. At the same time, the line's former track connections to the Fulton Street Elevated were severed. Subway trains from Manhattan and elevated trains from Franklin Avenue served Brighton Line stations, sharing the line to Coney Island.

During the 1964–1965 fiscal year, the platforms at Beverley Road, along with those at six other stations on the Brighton Line, were lengthened to 615 feet (187 m) to accommodate a ten-car train of 60 feet (18 m)-long cars, or a nine-car train of 67 feet (20 m)-long cars.

In April 1993, the New York State Legislature agreed to give the MTA $9.6 billion for capital improvements. Some of the funds would be used to renovate nearly one hundred New York City Subway stations, including Beverley Road. The station was added to the National Register of Historic Places in 2004.

== Station layout ==
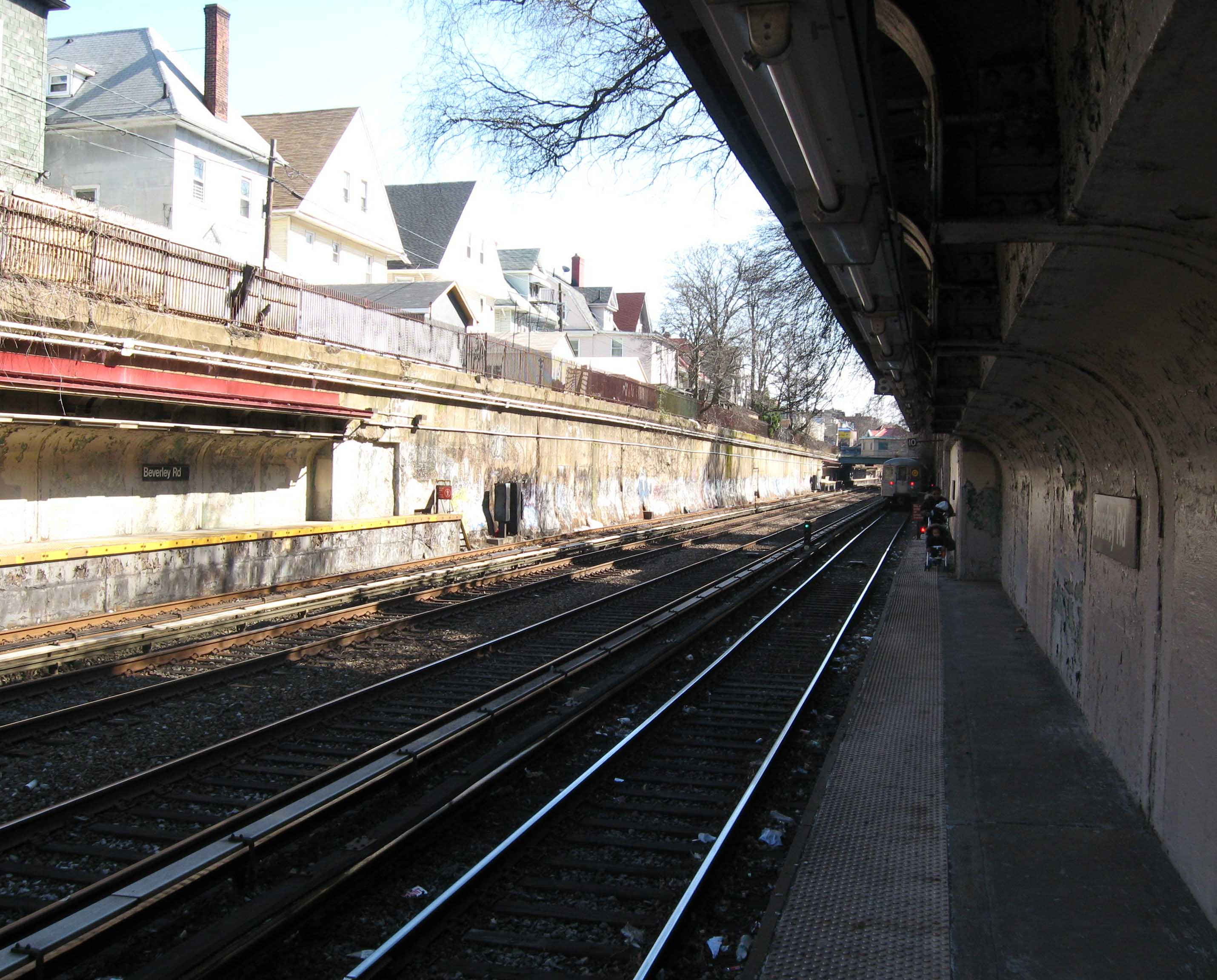
Looking south toward the Cortelyou Road station

This open-cut station has four tracks and two side platforms, typical for a New York City Subway local station.

This station's name is spelled with three "e"s while the Beverly Road station on the IRT Nostrand Avenue Line on the same street is spelled with three "e"s. That is because the street is split in half at Flatbush Avenue. To the west, it is spelled with three "e"s and to the east, formerly with two; the Brighton Line station serves the western half of Beverley Road. The 1907 station-house was the focus of an early 1990s in-house renovation. Sitting on the open-cut portion of the Brighton Line, another gentle curve to the right is at the far north end along with clearly visible platform extensions, allowing passengers to watch trains between Church Avenue and Cortelyou Road. The Beverley Road and Cortelyou Road stations are the closest operational stations in the New York City Subway system, being 500 ft (150 m) apart.

=== Exit ===
The station's sole entrance is through a station house at Beverley Road between Marlborough Road and East 16th Streets. The station-house features artwork called Garden Stops by Patsy Norvell, which has etched images of leaves on the glass windows inside fare control facing the south. The artwork can be seen from both inside the mezzanine and while standing on either platform to the south; this artwork is also visible at the neighboring Cortelyou Road station. Colors at this station are green and beige.

== See also ==
- National Register of Historic Places listings in Brooklyn
