= Church Avenue station (BMT Brighton Line) =

New York City Subway station in Brooklyn

Church Avenue
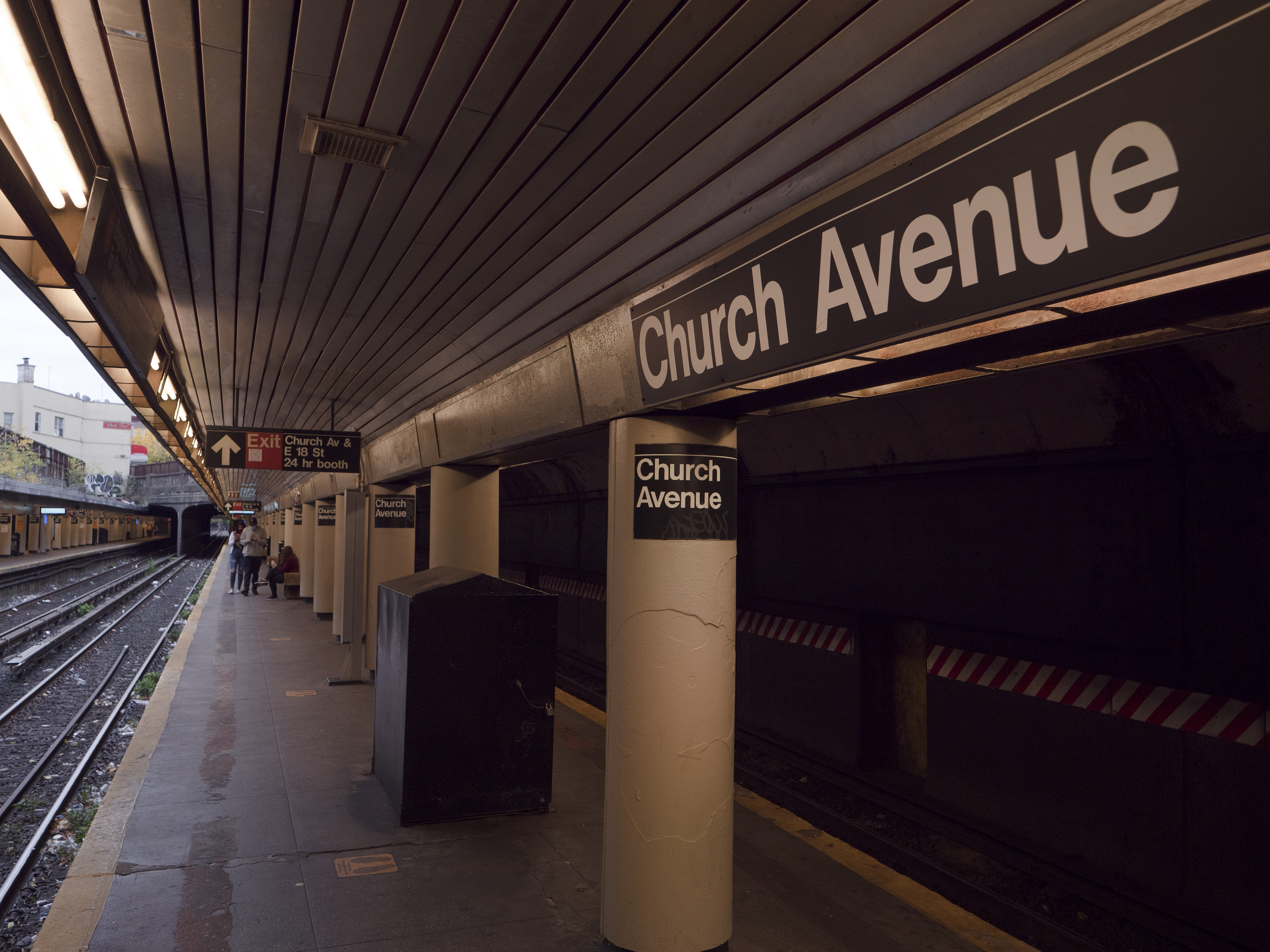
- View of the southbound platform

Station statistics
- Address: Church Avenue & East 18th Street; Brooklyn, New York
- Borough: Brooklyn
- Locale: Flatbush
- Coordinates: 40.64966°N 73.963646°W
- Division: B (BMT)
- Line: BMT Brighton Line
- Services: B (weekday rush hours, middays and early evenings); Q (all times)
- Transit: NYCT Bus: B16, B35
- Structure: Open-cut
- Platforms: 2 island platforms cross-platform interchange
- Tracks: 4

Other information
- Opened: original station: July 2, 1878; 148 years ago
- Rebuilt: current station: 1907; 119 years ago
- Accessible: Yes

Traffic
- 2025: 2,870,789 ▲1.6%
- Rank: 134 out of 423
Services
Preceding station	New York City Subway	Following station
Prospect Park B toward 145th Street	Express	Newkirk Plaza B toward Brighton Beach
Parkside Avenue Q toward 96th Street	Local	Beverley Road Q toward Coney Island–Stillwell Avenue
Location
Location within New York City Subway
Location within New York City
Location within New York
Track layout
Street map
Station service legend
Symbol	Description
Stops all times	Stops all times
Stops weekdays during the day	Stops weekdays during the day

The Church Avenue station is an express station on the BMT Brighton Line of the New York City Subway, located at Church Avenue near East 18th Street in the Flatbush neighborhood of Brooklyn. The station is served by the Q train at all times and by the B train on weekdays only.

== History ==
=== Early history ===
The original station at this location was a two-track side platform station that ran south from Church Avenue, whereas the current station runs to the north. At a point about 150 feet (46 m) south of Church Avenue, a clear difference in the form of the concrete retaining wall is visible on both sides of the right-of-way. This marks the point where the original Brighton Beach Line transitioned from an open-cut line depressed below ground level to a surface railroad for the remainder of the run to Coney Island. The line south of this point was converted from a two-track surface line to a four-track grade-separated line in 1907, and the portion north of this point was rebuilt from a two-track open cut to a four-track open cut in 1919.

On August 1, 1920, a tunnel under Flatbush Avenue opened, connecting the Brighton Line to the Broadway subway in Manhattan. At the same time, the line's former track connections to the Fulton Street Elevated were severed. Subway trains from Manhattan and elevated trains from Franklin Avenue served Brighton Line stations, sharing the line to Coney Island.

=== Renovations ===
During the 1964–1965 fiscal year, the platforms at Church Avenue, along with those at six other stations on the Brighton Line, were lengthened to 615 feet (187 m) to accommodate a ten-car train of 60 foot (18 m)-long cars, or a nine-car train of 67 foot (20 m)-long cars.

In 1981, the Metropolitan Transportation Authority (MTA) listed the station among the 69 most deteriorated stations in the subway system. In 1982, the MTA began renovating the station.

In 2019, as part of an initiative to increase the accessibility of the New York City Subway system, the MTA announced that it would install elevators at the Church Avenue station as part of the MTA's 2020–2024 Capital Program. In November 2022, the MTA announced that it would award a $965 million contract for the installation of 21 elevators across eight stations, including Church Avenue. A joint venture of ASTM and Halmar International would construct the elevators under a public-private partnership. In addition to the new elevators, this project included two new staircases. To accommodate the work, all B trains were rerouted to run local between Prospect Park and Kings Highway. Additionally, southbound trains bypassed the station from August 4 to November 23, 2024; northbound trains skipped the station until February 17, 2025. The MTA also announced in 2025 that a customer service center would open at the station. This customer service center, along with an entrance containing new staircases and elevators, opened on November 10, 2025.

== Station layout ==
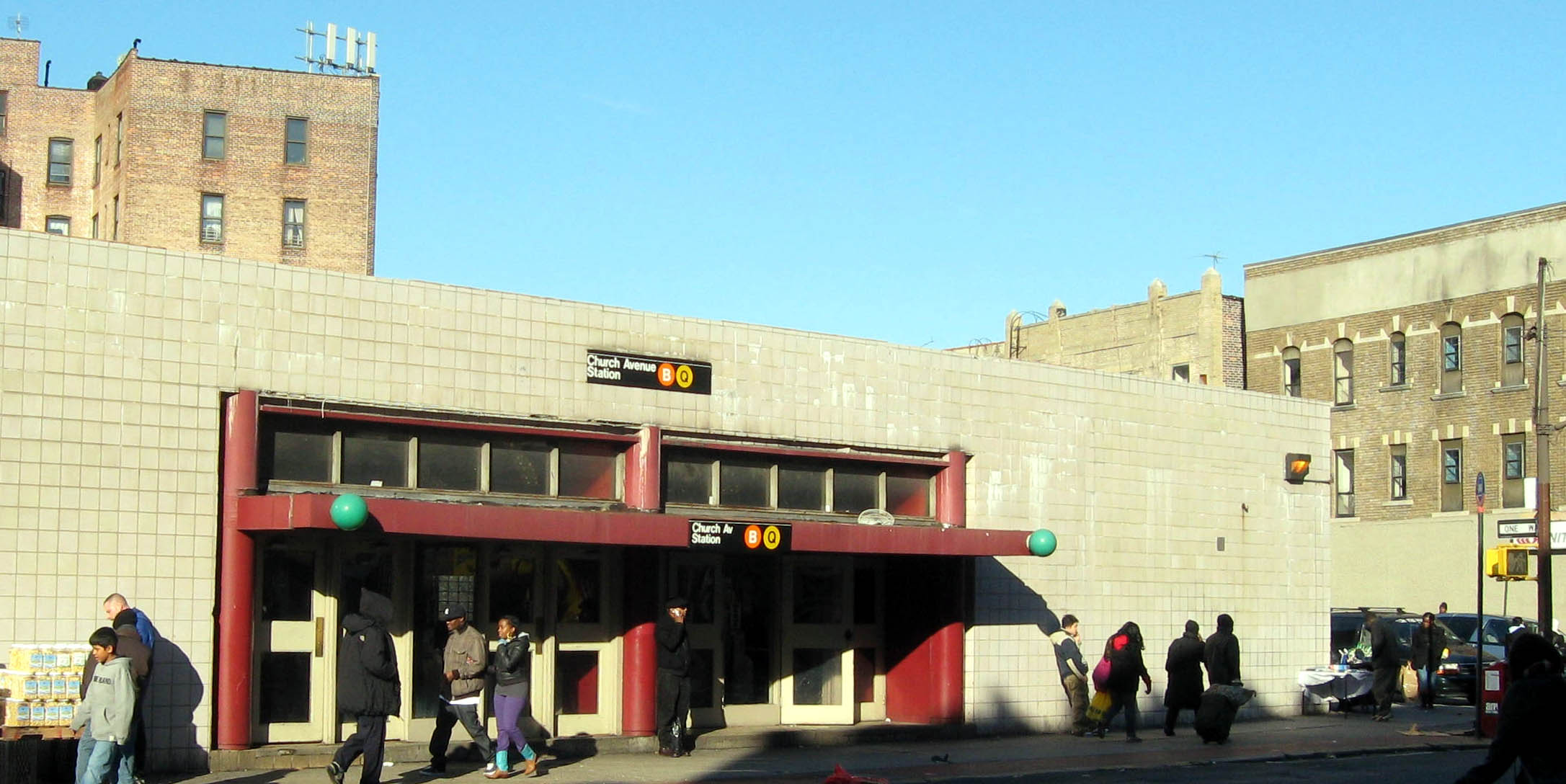
Station house

Church Avenue is an open-cut express station with short tunnels at each end to carry the line between cross streets. The station has four tracks and two island platforms. Each platform has two staircases, leading to a station-house at each end. The Q stops here at all times and is local, while the B stops here only on weekdays during the day and is express. The next stop to the north is Parkside Avenue for local trains and Prospect Park for express trains, while the next stop to the south is Beverley Road for local trains and Newkirk Plaza for express trains.

=== Exits ===
There are three exits and entrances to the station, all through stationhouses.

The southern entrance is at the south end of the station on the north side of Church Avenue. The original station house at this entrance was demolished and replaced with the current structure. Plain white tiles dot the interior and exterior of this entrance. There are restrooms inside fare control to the right side.

The northern entrance is at the north end of the station by Caton Avenue and St. Pauls Place. The stationhouse at this entrance retains the original c.1918 exterior. This end of the station originally had a part-time booth during the morning rush; a high-exit turnstile was open at all other times.

A third entrance is at the center of the station on the east side of East 18th Street, between Caton and Church Avenues. This entrance contains the ADA-accessible elevators to both platforms. This entrance replaces a smaller exit that led only from the southbound platform. The exit had a small structure made from brick and stucco; it was added in the early 1960s, but was closed by the early 1980s.

Exit location	Number of exits	Platform served
NW corner of E. 18th Street & Church Avenue	1	Both
SE corner of St Pauls Place & Caton Avenue	1	Both
E. 18th Street between Caton Avenue & Church Avenue	1	Both

== See also ==
- Church Avenue (IRT Nostrand Avenue Line)
- Church Avenue (IND Culver Line)
- Church Avenue line (bus)
- IND Church Avenue Line
