= Seventh Avenue station (BMT Brighton Line) =

New York City Subway station in Brooklyn

7 Avenue
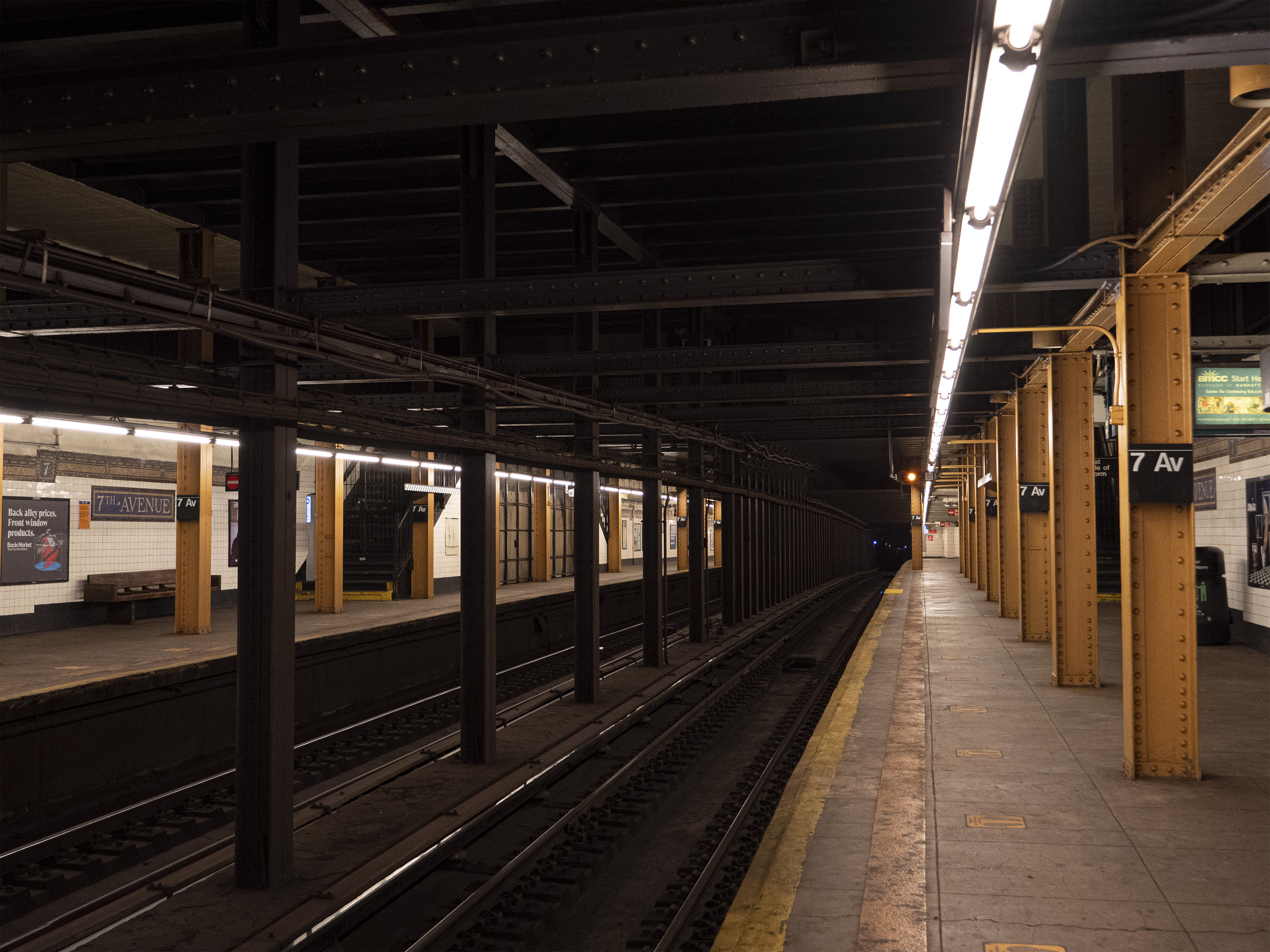
- View from southbound platform

Station statistics
- Address: Seventh Avenue, Park Place & Flatbush Avenue; Brooklyn, New York
- Borough: Brooklyn
- Locale: Park Slope, Prospect Heights
- Coordinates: 40.679352°N 73.973694°W
- Division: B (BMT)
- Line: BMT Brighton Line
- Services: B (weekday rush hours, middays and early evenings); Q (all times)
- Transit: NYCT Bus: B41, B67, B69
- Structure: Underground
- Platforms: 2 side platforms
- Tracks: 2

Other information
- Opened: August 1, 1920; 106 years ago

Traffic
- 2025: 2,316,373 ▲6.5%
- Rank: 158 out of 423
Services
Preceding station	New York City Subway	Following station
Atlantic Avenue–Barclays Center B Q via DeKalb Avenue	B (New York City Subway service) Q (New York City Subway service)	Prospect Park B Q services split
Location
Location within New York City Subway
Location within New York City
Location within New York
Track layout
Street map
Station service legend
Symbol	Description
Stops all times	Stops all times
Stops weekdays during the day	Stops weekdays during the day

The Seventh Avenue station is a station on the BMT Brighton Line of the New York City Subway, located at the intersection of Seventh Avenue, Park Place and Flatbush Avenue in Park Slope and Prospect Heights, Brooklyn. The station is served by the Q train at all times and by the B train on weekdays only.

== History ==
Although on the BMT Brighton Line, Seventh Avenue was built almost fifty years after the main segment of the line from Prospect Park to Brighton Beach opened in 1878. Prior to its opening, trains on the line used what is now the Franklin Avenue Shuttle and a connection to the elevated BMT Fulton Street Line on their way to the line's terminus at Fulton Ferry in Brooklyn or Park Row in Manhattan.

=== Construction and opening ===
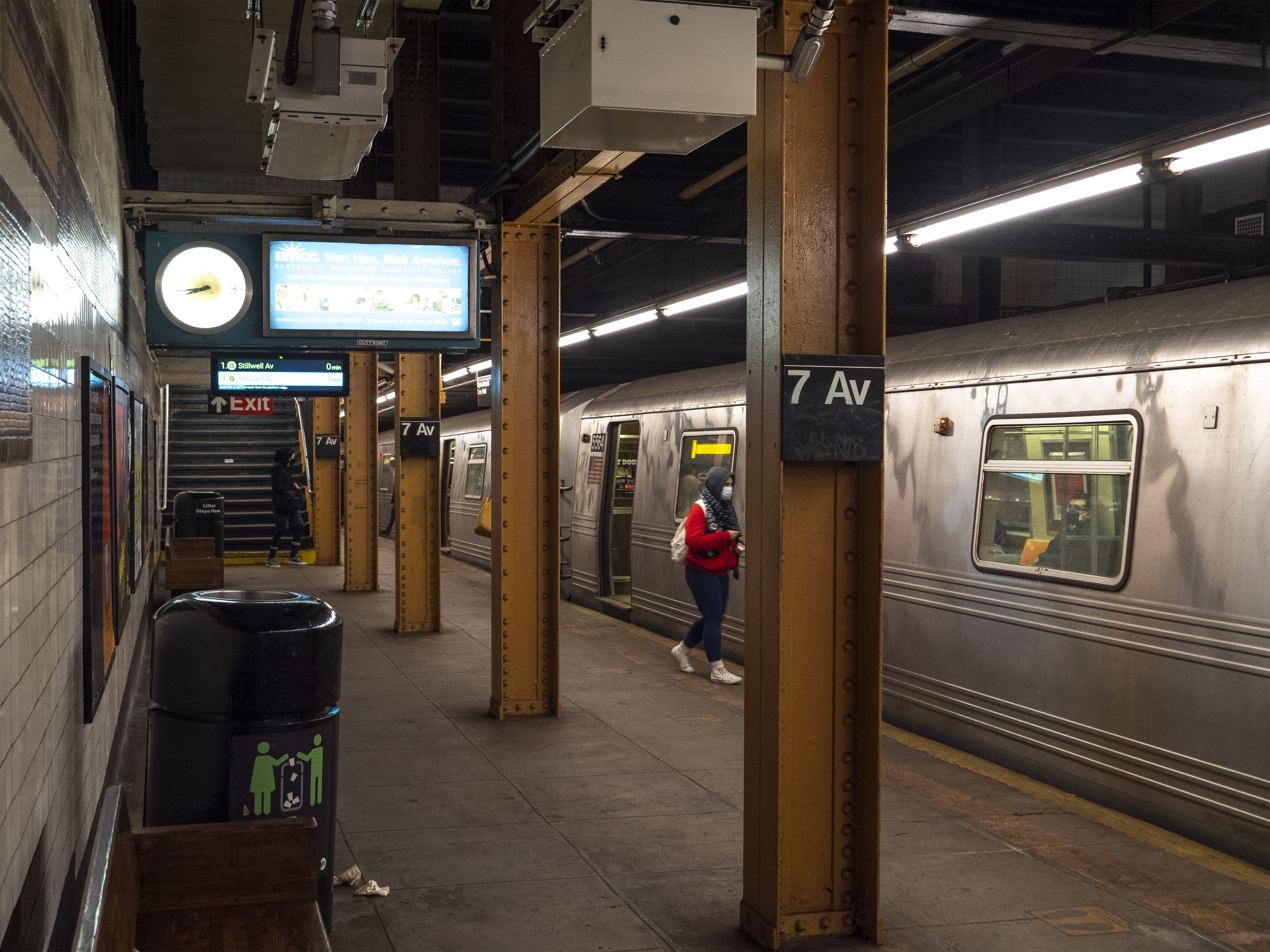
R46 Q train boarding at the southbound platform

The Dual Contracts were formalized in March 1913, specifying new lines or expansions to be built by the Interborough Rapid Transit Company (IRT) and the Brooklyn Rapid Transit Company (BRT; after 1923, the Brooklyn–Manhattan Transit Corporation or BMT). Two lines under Flatbush Avenue, one operated by the BRT and IRT, were approved. The BRT route, an extension of the Brighton Line, was to run under Flatbush Avenue and St. Felix Street in Downtown Brooklyn, with a station at Seventh Avenue. The IRT was authorized to extend its Brooklyn line (now the Eastern Parkway Line) under Flatbush Avenue, with a four-track route paralleling the BRT's subway southeast of the existing Atlantic Avenue station.

The BRT route was originally planned as a four-track line. Groundbreaking for the lines under Flatbush Avenue took place in May 1914, by which point the BRT line was reduced to two tracks. The Seventh Avenue station was built as part of section 1A of the Flatbush Avenue tunnel, which extended from Prospect Place to Grand Army Plaza. The contract for this section was awarded to the Cranford Construction Company on May 1, 1914. The BRT Brighton Line's Seventh Avenue station opened on August 1, 1920, providing direct service between the existing Brighton Line and Midtown Manhattan. This moved trains from the elevated Franklin Avenue Line to the new underground line.

=== Later years ===
During the 1964–1965 fiscal year, the platforms at Seventh Avenue, along with those at six other stations on the Brighton Line, were lengthened to 615 feet (187 m) to accommodate a ten-car train of 60 feet (18 m)-long cars, or a nine-car train of 67 feet (20 m)-long cars.

== Station layout ==
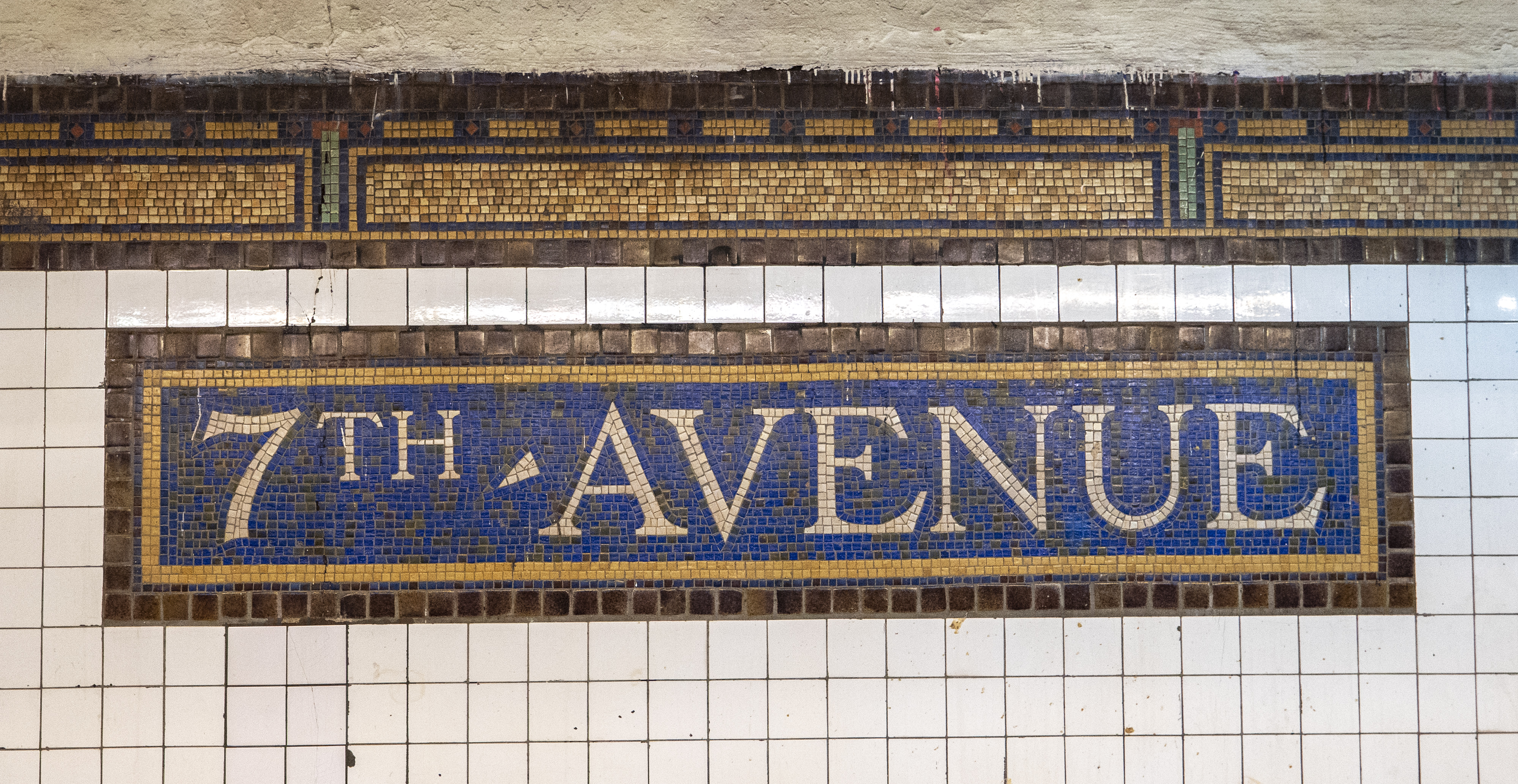
Mosaic name tablet

The Seventh Avenue station has two tracks and two side platforms. The platforms are superimposed above the IRT Eastern Parkway Line's express tracks, which run on a lower level. There is a mezzanine above the station, which leads to exits on either side of Flatbush Avenue. The mezzanine crosses over the Eastern Parkway Line's local tracks, which flank the BMT tracks on either side. Each platform has two closed staircases that lead to a closed portion of the mezzanine above the platforms.

North of Seventh Avenue, the Brighton Line tracks descend slightly beneath the Eastern Parkway local tracks at the Bergen Street station, while the Eastern Parkway express tracks rise to a higher level. South of the Seventh Avenue station, the Eastern Parkway local tracks rise above the Brighton Line tracks to serve the Grand Army Plaza station.

Both platform walls have a golden mosaic trim line with blue and brown borders and white on blue "7" friezes appearing within them at regular intervals. Mosaic name tablets reading "7TH AVENUE" in white seriffed lettering on a blue background and gold and brown border appear below the trim lines. Gamboge I-beam columns run along both platforms, alternating ones having the standard black station name plate with white lettering.

This is one of two stations on the B train named "Seventh Avenue"; the other is Seventh Avenue–53rd Street on the IND Sixth Avenue Line in Manhattan.

=== Exits ===
This station has two entrances and exits. One stair goes up to the south sidewalk of Park Place east of Flatbush Avenue, while the other stair goes to the south sidewalk of Flatbush Avenue southeast of Park Place.
