= Q (New York City Subway service) =

Rapid transit service

- Broadway Express

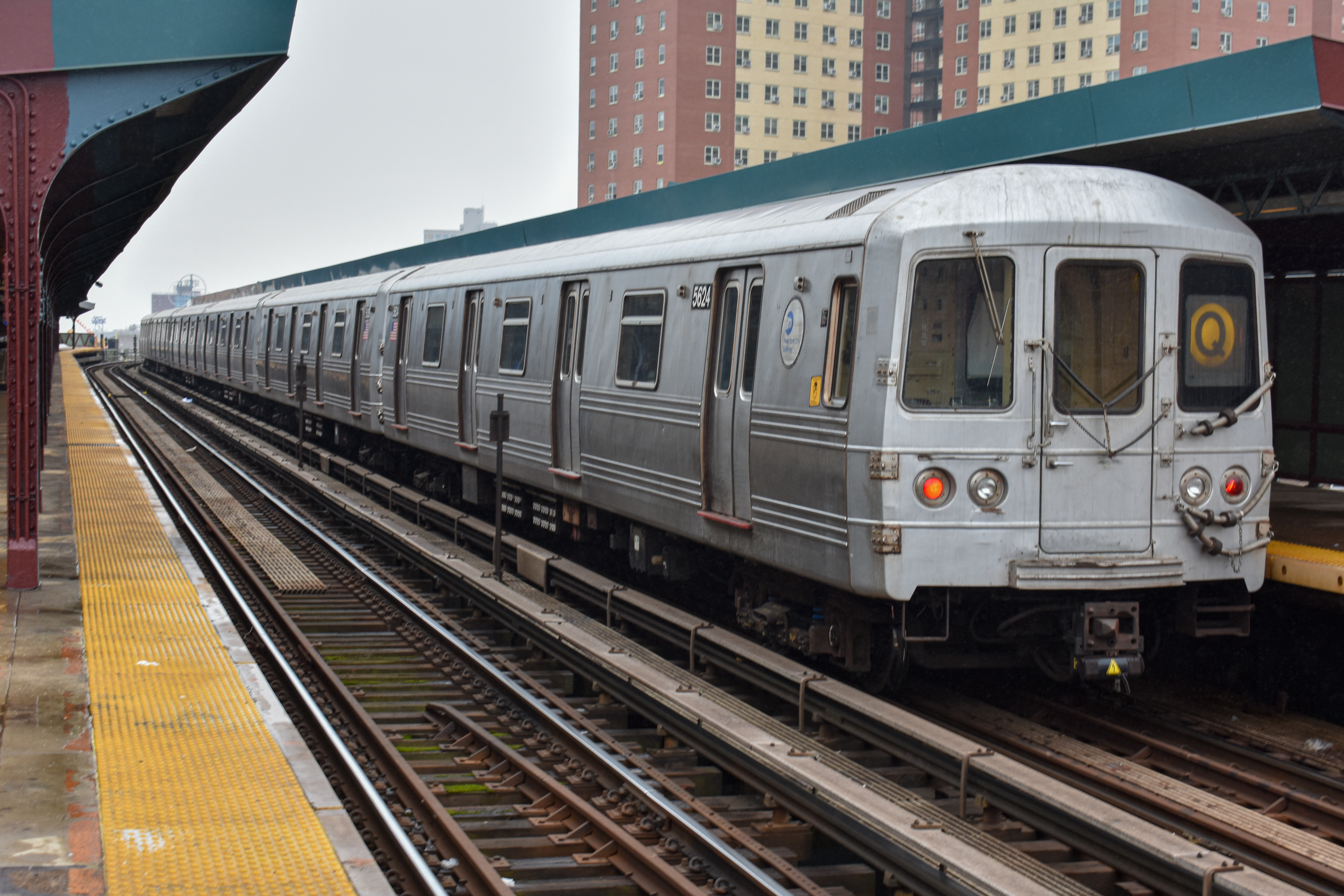
- A Manhattan-bound Q train of R46 cars at West Eighth Street–New York Aquarium station.

- Northern end: 96th Street
- Southern end: Coney Island–Stillwell Avenue
- Stations: 29; 34 (late night service)
- Rolling stock: R46; R68; R68A (Rolling stock assignments subject to change)
- Depot: Coney Island Yard
- Started service: 1878; 148 years ago (predecessor, along with current Franklin Avenue Shuttle); August 1, 1920; 106 years ago (current Q service)

The Q Broadway Express (Note: The Metropolitan Transportation Authority's official text map gives the route's name as the "Q 2nd Avenue/Broadway Express".) is a rapid transit service in the B Division of the New York City Subway. Its route emblem, or "bullet", is colored yellow since it is a part of the BMT Broadway Line in Manhattan.

The Q operates 24 hours daily between 96th Street on the Upper East Side of Manhattan and Stillwell Avenue in Coney Island, Brooklyn. Daytime service makes express stops in Manhattan (between 57th Street–Seventh Avenue and Canal Street) and all stops in Brooklyn; overnight service makes all stops along the full route.

The Q was originally the Brooklyn–Manhattan Transit Corporation's (BMT) 1 service; beginning in 1920, it ran along the Brighton Line in Brooklyn and Broadway Line in Manhattan. In the past, the Q has run many different service patterns in Brooklyn, Manhattan and Queens, both local and express, including QB service on the Manhattan Bridge and QT service via the Montague Street Tunnel. From 1988 to 2001, Q service ran along the IND Sixth Avenue Line in Manhattan, with a bullet colored orange. The Q also ran in Queens at various points, including along the BMT Astoria Line to Astoria–Ditmars Boulevard on weekdays from 2010 to 2016, along the IND Queens Boulevard Line to Forest Hills–71st Avenue during temporary post-9/11 service reroutes, and along the IND 63rd Street Line to 21st Street–Queensbridge until 2001. There was also a <Q> variant from 2001 to 2004, which ran express on the Brighton Line, used a diamond bullet, and terminated at Brighton Beach due to construction on the north side of the Manhattan Bridge. On January 1, 2017, the Q was rerouted along the Second Avenue Subway.

== History ==
=== 1878–1920: Original railroad ===
The predecessor to the subway service known as the Q today was the Brooklyn, Flatbush and Coney Island Railway. On July 2, 1878, this steam railroad began operations on what would become the BMT Brighton Line, from Prospect Park to the Brighton Beach Hotel in Brighton Beach, which opened at the same time. The Brighton Beach Hotel was located on Coney Island by the Atlantic Ocean at the foot of modern-day Coney Island Avenue. Passengers could make connections with the horsecars of the Brooklyn City Railroad at the Prospect Park terminal.

On August 19, 1878, service was extended north from Prospect Park along what is today the BMT Franklin Avenue Line used by the Franklin Avenue Shuttle, to Atlantic Avenue west of Franklin Avenue, a location known as Bedford station on what is today the Atlantic Branch of the Long Island Rail Road (LIRR). A physical connection existed between the Brighton, Flatbush and Coney Island Railway and the LIRR. By mutual agreement trains of the Brooklyn, Flatbush and Coney Island Railway ran on LIRR trackage west to its terminal at Flatbush Avenue and Atlantic Avenue, providing a connection to Downtown Brooklyn and ferries to Manhattan. LIRR trains also operated to Brighton Beach from Flatbush Avenue and from its own terminal in Long Island City, with ferry access to Midtown Manhattan. Initially, service operated during the summer season only. At the end of the 1882 summer season, the LIRR abrogated its agreement allowing Brighton Line trains to access its Flatbush Avenue terminal and beginning with the 1883 summer season, only Brooklyn, Flatbush and Coney Island trains operated between Bedford Terminal and Brighton Beach.

In 1896, a short elevated extension of the Brighton Beach Line (since reorganized as the Brooklyn & Brighton Beach Railroad) opened to the corner of Franklin Avenue and Fulton Street in the north. This extension connected to the Fulton Street Line of the Kings County Elevated Railroad, allowing rapid transit trains on Fulton Street to operate along the Brighton Line. These trains ran from Brighton Beach, up the Franklin Avenue and Fulton Street lines to the Brooklyn side of the Brooklyn Bridge, where walking or transferring to a cable car service connection over the bridge allowed access to New York City Hall at Park Row in Manhattan. In 1900, elevated trains were through-routed to Park Row without need to change trains. By 1903, a surface extension of the Brighton Beach Line on what is now Brighton Beach Avenue permitted through service from Park Row, Manhattan west to Culver Depot at Surf Avenue near West 8th Street, much nearer to the growing amusement center known then as West Brighton and now as Coney Island.

In 1908, a massive grade crossing elimination project was completed with a 4-track line from south of Church Avenue station to Neptune Avenue near the Coney Island Creek, permitting true local and express service, as pioneered on the New York City Subway that opened in 1904. The Brighton Beach line was also converted to electrified third rail. Brighton Beach local and express service was extended to a new West End terminal at Stillwell and Surf Avenues, the location of the Coney Island terminal for the BMT Southern Division, in May 1919.

=== 1920–1950: Subway service begins ===
On August 1, 1920, subway service on the BMT Brighton Line, then owned by the Brooklyn-Manhattan Transit Corporation (BMT), officially began with the openings of a two-track underground subway between Prospect Park and DeKalb Avenue and the Montague Street Tunnel between Brooklyn and Manhattan.

In 1921, PM rush hour express service was extended from Kings Highway to Brighton Beach. In 1923, Brighton express service operated via the Montague Tunnel and ran local on the Broadway Line. The BMT held a vote to see which route riders preferred on August 30, 1923. Passengers voted to have Brighton expresses run from Brighton Beach to Times Square via the Manhattan Bridge and the express tracks on the Broadway Line. This change took effect on about October 1, 1923. This subway service was labeled 1 by the BMT starting in 1924, with the remnant service to Franklin Avenue becoming the 7. 1 Brighton Express service operated during rush hours and Saturday afternoons. During the evening rush hour and on Saturday afternoons, trains skipped Canal Street.

The span of express service was extended by 90 minutes until 8:27 p.m. leaving Times Square in 1929. Express service began operating between the AM rush hour and noon on Saturday mornings in April 1930. Express service began operating middays on May 30, 1931, replacing short-line local service. In September 1937, Brighton express service ran between Brighton Beach and Times Square rush hours, middays, and early evenings weekdays and Saturdays.

During the 1930s, limited morning rush hour service ran via the south side tracks of the Manhattan Bridge and the Nassau Street Loop to Chambers Street on the BMT Nassau Street Line. On June 29, 1950, trains began running there during the evening rush as well.

On October 17, 1949, the IRT Astoria Line in Queens, up to this point operated by the Interborough Rapid Transit (IRT), was converted to BMT operation. 1 Local trains were extended via the 60th Street Tunnel and the BMT Astoria Line to Astoria–Ditmars Boulevard during weekday rush hours, and on Saturday mornings and early afternoons. Number 2 Fourth Avenue Local trains also ran here at all times.

=== 1950s ===
On April 27, 1950, 1 Local trains were extended to Astoria–Ditmars Boulevard during middays. On June 26, 1952, 1 Express trains were extended from Times Square to 57th Street–Seventh Avenue on weekdays after the morning rush hour, running local north of 34th Street. On June 28, 1952, special service from Brighton Beach to the Nassau Street Line was discontinued on Saturdays, and Saturday express service was extended to 57th Street.

The 60th Street Tunnel Connection opened on December 1, 1955, connecting the Broadway Line to the IND Queens Boulevard Line. 1 Local trains were rerouted to this new connector to Forest Hills–71st Avenue in Forest Hills, Queens between 6:30 a.m. and 8:20 p.m. They were replaced on the BMT Astoria Line by 1 Express trains on weekdays. On May 4, 1957, 1 Express trains running started running to Ditmars Boulevard on Saturdays as well, but made local stops in Manhattan as the local trains in Brooklyn now ran to Chambers Street via the BMT Nassau Street Line. The final portion of the Broadway Line's express tracks, between Times Square–42nd Street and 57th Street–Seventh Avenue, was placed in service on May 2, 1957. 1 Brighton Express trains ran local in Manhattan on Saturdays while Brighton Locals ran express here during evenings and on Sundays. This lasted only until the next service change. On October 24, 1957, Brighton Local trains ran via the Manhattan Bridge and local in Manhattan, all day on Sundays as well as evenings and midnight hours. Brighton Express 1 service on weekdays began using the express tracks between Times Square–42nd Street and 57th Street–Seventh Avenue.

A December 1957 strike shut down much of the BMT Division. Brighton Local 1 trains ran in two sections, from Coney Island via tunnel to 57th Street-Seventh Avenue and from Whitehall Street to Jamaica–179th Street on the IND Queens Boulevard Line. Due to the differing unions predominating on the various divisions, the IND was completely knocked out of service, while the IRT ran virtually normal service. The BMT was about half affected, with makeshift service patterns being set up for the duration of the strike.

On May 28, 1959, 1 Brighton Express trains midday on weekdays were cut back to 57th Street–Seventh Avenue and made local stops in Brooklyn midday. Multiple trains entered service at Queensboro Plaza in the evening rush hour. Nassau Specials returned, running via the Montague Street tunnel during the morning rush and via the Manhattan Bridge during the evening rush. As part of the same service change, Brighton Local trains, beginning on June 6, ran to Franklin Avenue via the route of the 7 Shuttle on Saturdays. This was not seasonal and ran the entire day, being quite distinct from the Sunday service which still operated.

=== 1960–1987: Lettered variants and Chrystie Street Connection ===
On November 15, 1960, with the arrival of the R27 subway cars, 1 service on the Brighton Line was relabeled. Brighton Express service was designated as Q, Brighton Local via the Montague St Tunnel as QT, and Brighton Local via the Manhattan Bridge as QB. Single letters were used to refer to express lines and double letters for local lines, a practice that began thirty years earlier with the Independent Subway System (IND), however, no QQ designation was ever used. Despite these new designations, subway communications continued to refer to the services as "Brighton Local" and "Brighton Express".

Effective January 1, 1961, Q Brighton Express service was cut back from Ditmars Boulevard to 57th Street–Seventh Avenue on weekdays, with trains skipping 49th Street. Saturday daytime service continued to run to Ditmars Boulevard. QT service ran to Ditmars Boulevard on weekdays; on Saturdays, it ran via the Franklin Avenue Line to Franklin Avenue in Brooklyn instead. The QB provided off-peak service between Coney Island and Astoria, via Brighton Local and the Manhattan Bridge. Sunday service between Franklin Avenue and Brighton Beach was discontinued on this date, with Sunday service now provided solely by the Franklin Avenue Shuttle (SS, formerly 7) between Prospect Park and Fulton Street.

Service between Brighton Beach and Franklin Avenue was merged into the Franklin Avenue Shuttle service on October 14, 1961, and all non-shuttle service between was discontinued in February 1963. The Fourth Avenue Local (RR) now provided Broadway Line service along the Queens Boulevard line on weekdays, and the West End Express (T) was extended from 57th Street to Ditmars Boulevard during rush hours. This service change essentially swapped the northern terminals of the Brighton Local and RR, and between the Brighton Express and T. Prior to this both Brighton Line–Broadway services had operated via the 60th Street Tunnel to Queens. By having the Brighton Express Q terminate at 57th Street, this change served to keep one Brighton Line service unaffected in the event of a massive delay in the 60th Street Tunnel.

On April 21, 1962, Saturday express Q service was discontinued, and replaced by QB service. All Saturday trains on the Brighton Line began running local, doubling the frequency of service and providing a one-seat ride to Manhattan for riders at local stations. With the arrival of new subway cars to the line, which provided improved running times, trains making local stops between Brighton Beach and Prospect Park did so in only 1.5 minutes longer than existing express service.

From February 10 to November 2, 1964, the Brighton Express tracks were closed to permit platform extension work at Newkirk Avenue. Skip-stop service was instituted along the Brighton Line. Brighton Express service, which made A stops, ran express from Brighton Beach to Kings Highway, and then stopped at Avenue J, Newkirk Avenue, Cortelyou Road, Beverley Road, Church Avenue, Parkside Avenue, and Prospect Park.

On November 26, 1967, the Chrystie Street Connection opened, connecting the Brighton Line in Brooklyn to the IND Sixth Avenue Line in Manhattan via the Manhattan Bridge. The bridge's south side tracks, which formerly connected to the BMT Nassau Street Line, were now connected to the Broadway Line express tracks instead. The bridge's north side tracks, which formerly connected to the Broadway Line, now connected to the Sixth Avenue Line express tracks. Originally, the D running via Sixth Avenue Express, and the QJ running via Nassau Street and the Montague Street Tunnel, were to replace all three Q services on the Brighton Line. The Q and QT went out of existence completely, but due to riders' opposition to the expected loss of all Broadway Line service, some QB trains were retained, now running rush hours only in the peak direction between Coney Island and 57th Street via Brighton Local, the Manhattan Bridge, and Broadway Express in Manhattan. The color scheme introduced for subway lines that day included a red QB bullet. A short-lived NX service also provided rush-hour service between Brighton Beach and Coney Island and the Broadway Line, running via the BMT Sea Beach Line to Manhattan. This service was discontinued on April 15, 1968, after less than five months. The RR replaced Q, QB and QT service to Astoria–Ditmars Boulevard.

On August 19, 1968, one AM rush hour QB train began running to Ditmars Boulevard. From January 2, 1973, no QB trains ran in service to Ditmars Boulevard, though two trains ran light to Ditmars Boulevard from 57th Street in the AM rush, and one train ran light to 57th Street in the PM rush. On January 19, 1976, morning rush hour QB trains began running in service to Ditmars Boulevard, and most evening rush hour trains entered service at Queensboro Plaza, with only one evening rush hour train running from Coney Island to 57th Street. All but the first QB morning QB trip, which entered RR service, were cut back from Ditmars Boulevard to 57th Street on August 30, 1976. Evening rush hour trains only ran in service between Coney Island and 57th Street. The last PM rush hour QB train started at Ditmars Boulevard, having previously made a trip in RR service. The first two morning rush hour QB trains ran to Ditmars Boulevard as of May 7, 1978, returning in service as RR trains to 36th Street. The last two evening rush hour QB trains entered service at Ditmars Boulevard, with the final trip having previously made an RR trip from 36th Street. In 1979, the MTA released a revised coloring scheme for subway routes based on trunk line; the QB service was assigned the color sunflower yellow, with black text, because it used the BMT Broadway Line in Manhattan. It now used a diamond-shaped bullet because it ran rush hours only. On May 5, 1985, the double-letter naming scheme for local services was dropped; the QB was renamed the Q the next day.

=== Manhattan Bridge reconstruction and Brighton Line rehabilitation work (1986–2004) ===
==== 1986–1987: Broadway service ====
Starting on April 26, 1986, the Brighton Line's local tracks underwent reconstruction between Prospect Park and Newkirk Avenue, requiring the suspension of express service; at the same time, reconstruction of the Manhattan Bridge started, which would disrupt subway service until 2004. QB service was discontinued. From April 28, 1986 to May 23, 1987, one AM rush hour train from Brighton Beach was extended beyond its normal terminal at 57th Street/Seventh Avenue and terminated at Forest Hills – 71st Avenue.

The bridge's north side tracks (leading to the Sixth Avenue Line) closed. The Q now ran rush hours between 57th Street–Seventh Avenue and Brighton Beach, using a yellow diamond bullet. Because the Manhattan Bridge's north side tracks closed, the D and Q ran on the bridge's south side tracks, both running via Broadway Express to 57th Street–Seventh Avenue. To substitute for the suspended Brighton Line express service, the Q ran skip-stop service with the D between Newkirk Avenue and Sheepshead Bay. D trains served Neck Road, Avenue M and Avenue H; the Q skipped those stops, serving Avenue U and Avenue J, while both lines served Kings Highway. By 1987, as reconstruction on the Brighton Line progressed, the weekday skip-stop pattern expanded to Prospect Park, with D trains serving Beverley Road while Q trains served Cortelyou Road and Parkside Avenue, with Church Avenue as a mutual station.

==== 1988–2001: Sixth Avenue service ====
On December 11, 1988, the Bridge's north side tracks reopened and the south side tracks closed, and the reconstruction project on the Brighton Line ended. The Q became the weekday Brighton Express to Brighton Beach and was rerouted via the north side of the bridge and the IND Sixth Avenue Line to 57th Street–Sixth Avenue, Midtown Manhattan. Because it ran on the Sixth Avenue Line in Manhattan, the route now used an orange bullet on maps. One AM rush hour train from Brighton Beach terminated at 168th Street in Manhattan instead of 21st Street; this trip last ran on September 28, 1990.

On October 29, 1989, the IND 63rd Street Line opened and the B, Q, and JFK Express were extended to 21st Street–Queensbridge in Long Island City. Weekday evening service terminated at Broadway–Lafayette Street in Manhattan instead of Brooklyn; these trains relayed at Second Avenue in order to change direction. A special combined F–Q service ran during late nights; in the northbound direction, F trains would operate along its normal route from Coney Island to 47th–50th Streets–Rockefeller Center, then turn into a Q and operate to 21st Street–Queensbridge; in the southbound direction, Q trains would operate from 21st Street to 47th–50th Streets, then turn into an F train and operate along its normal route to Coney Island. The weekday evening shuttle was replaced by the B on September 30, 1990. The F replaced the late night shuttle in April 1993.

In January 1991, a reduction of service along the Central Park West corridor to remove excess capacity was proposed. Initially, Q service would operate between 207th Street and Brighton Beach during weekday rush hours and middays, making express stops along its entire route. The service plan was later amended to eliminate the Q designation and replace it with an orange A, assuming the same service pattern that was proposed for the Q. This service change would have been implemented in October 1991, pending approval from the MTA board.

On February 6, 1995, Q trains began running local south of Kings Highway due to rehabilitation work on the Brighton Line. On April 30, 1995, the north side of the Manhattan Bridge closed during middays and weekends, in addition to the already-closed south side. During these hours, D service was cut below 34th Street–Herald Square. In its place, the Q ran between Coney Island and 21st Street–Queensbridge, via Brighton Local, the Montague Street Tunnel, Broadway Express (switching between the local and express tracks at Canal Street) and the BMT 63rd Street Line. Rush hour and evening service was unchanged. On May 1, Q expresses only operated during rush hours and early evening. Normal service resumed on November 12, 1995, including the restoration of Q express service between Kings Highway and Brighton Beach.

On February 22, 1998, construction on the IND 63rd Street Line cut B and Q service back to 57th Street–Sixth Avenue. Service on the 63rd Street Line was replaced by a shuttle to the BMT Broadway Line at 57th Street–Seventh Avenue. Normal service resumed on May 22, 1999.

==== 2001–2004: Brighton Express/Local Q service ====
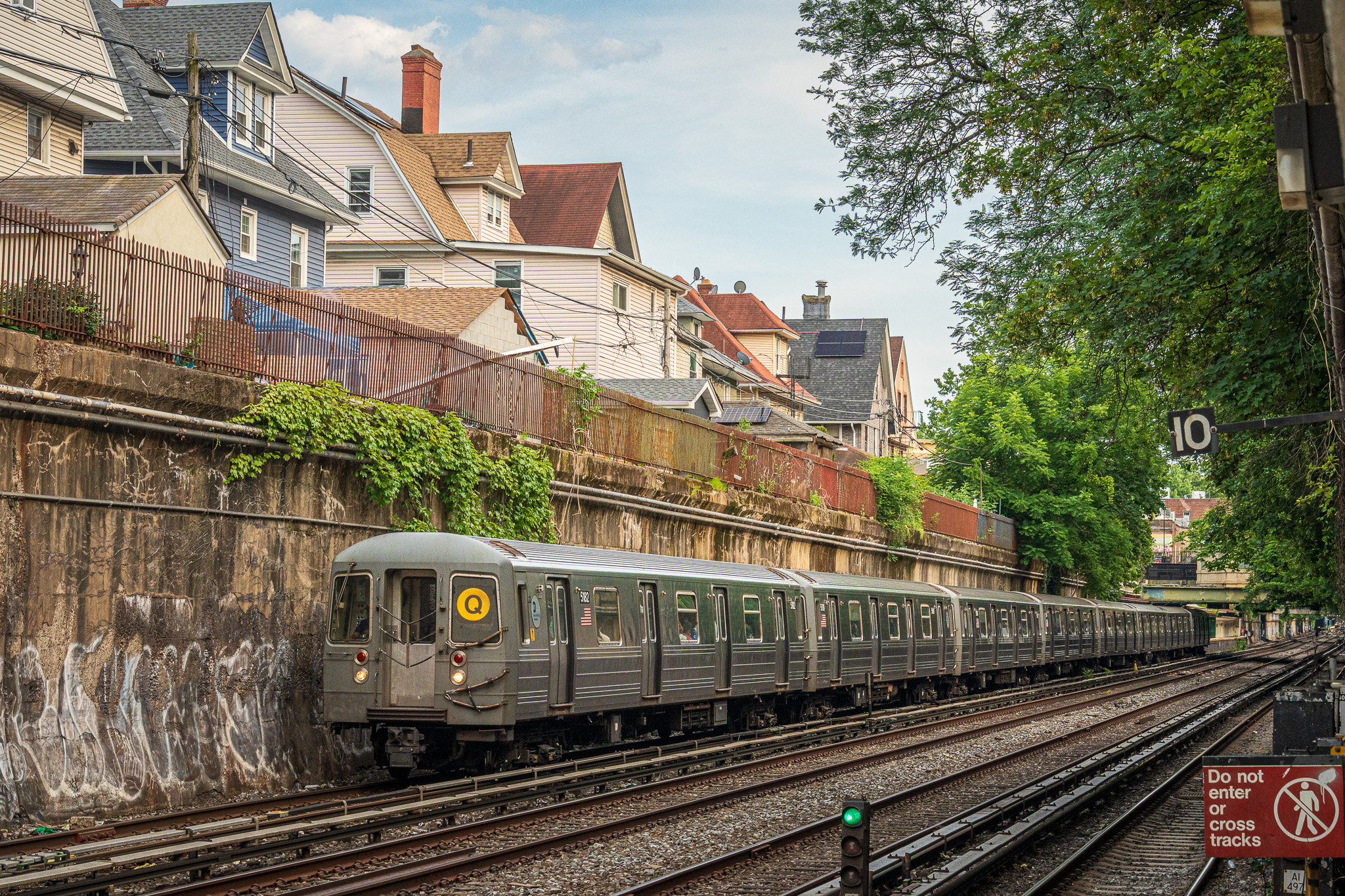
A Manhattan bound Q local train of R68As entering Beverley Road

On July 22, 2001, the Manhattan Bridge's north side tracks closed and the south side tracks reopened. There were now two Q services, colored yellow as they now ran via Broadway. In Brooklyn, the circle Q (Q local) replaced the D as the full-time Brighton Local to Stillwell Avenue while the <Q> (Q express or Q diamond) replaced the Sixth Avenue Q as the weekday-only Brighton Express to Brighton Beach. Both Qs used the south side of the Manhattan Bridge to travel into Manhattan and then ran to 57th Street–Seventh Avenue via Broadway Express. Service on the IND 63rd Street Line was replaced by a shuttle, which would be permanently replaced by the F in December 2001 once the 63rd Street's connection to the IND Queens Boulevard Line opened.

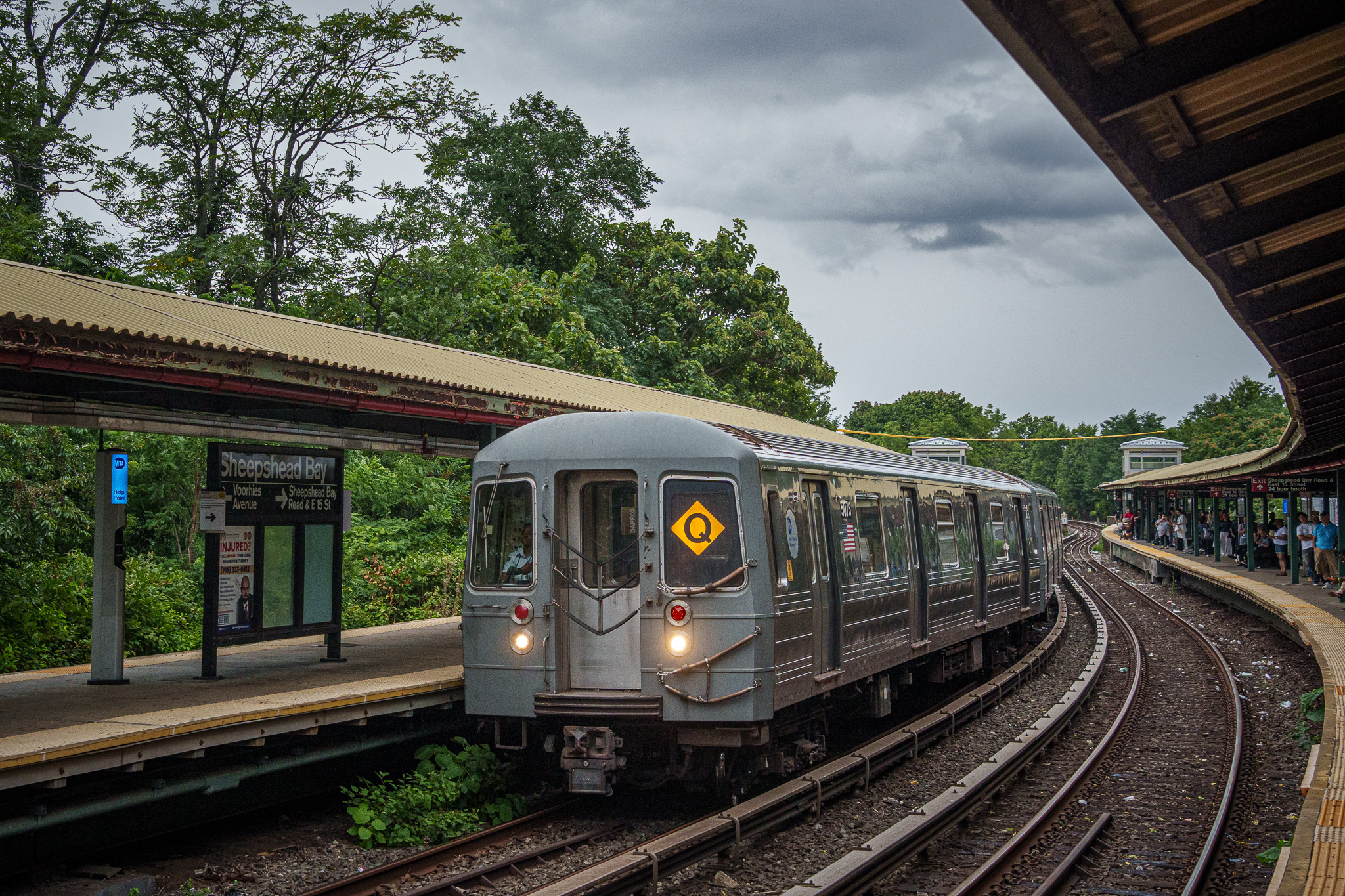
A Coney Island bound Q express train of R68As entering Sheepshead Bay

After the September 11, 2001 attacks, Q service was initially extended beyond 57th Street–Seventh Avenue and originated and terminated at 21st Street–Queensbridge via 63rd Street, but was cut back to its original terminal by the evening of September 12. On September 17, Q service was once again extended beyond 57th Street, this time originating and terminating at Forest Hills–71st Avenue via 60th Street to replace the R, and made all stops in Queens, Manhattan and Brooklyn; overnight service short turned at 57th Street and did not operate to or from 71st Avenue. <Q> Brighton Express service continued to operate its normal service pattern. Normal Q service was restored on October 28. On September 8, 2002, Coney Island–Stillwell Avenue (the Q's southern terminal) was closed for reconstruction and the Q local terminated at Brighton Beach. During this time, service at stations between Brighton Beach and Stillwell Avenue was replaced by an extension of the B68 bus. Q service to Stillwell Avenue resumed on May 23, 2004.

From April 27 to November 2, 2003, the south side of the Manhattan Bridge was closed on weekends and Q service was rerouted via the Montague Street Tunnel.

On February 22, 2004, reconstruction of the Manhattan Bridge was completed and the north side tracks reopened. The <Q> express was discontinued and replaced with the B in Brooklyn and N in Manhattan to combine two weekday-only routes. The Q local remained unchanged.

=== 2004–present: Extensions to Astoria and Second Avenue ===
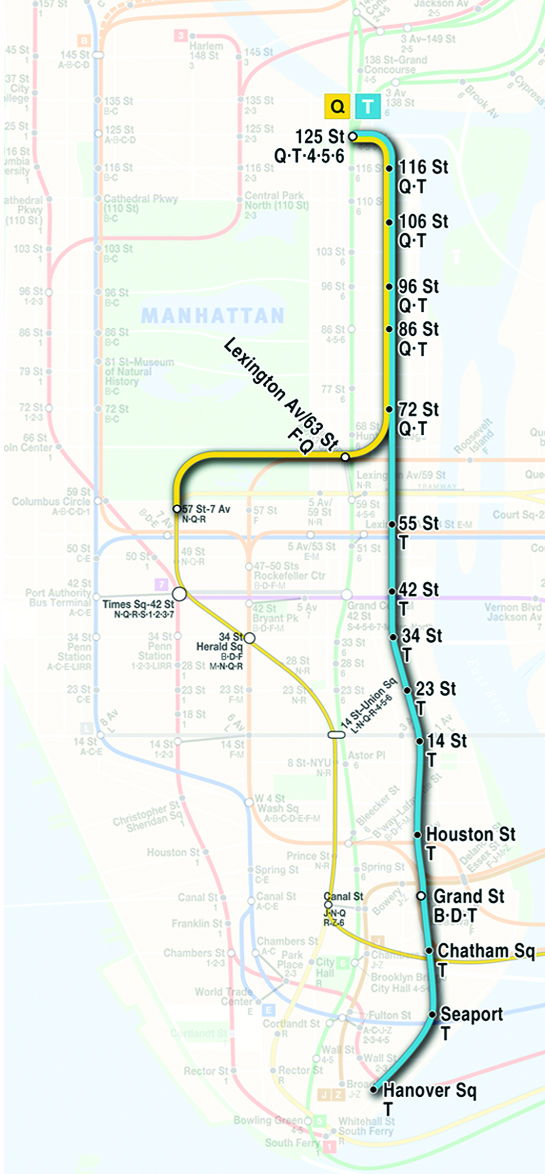
Map of the full Second Avenue Subway (SAS), showing the planned uptown portion of the Q, which currently terminates at 96th Street. Note that the section between Harlem–125th Street and Broadway is not included.

On June 28, 2010, the Q was extended from 57th Street–Seventh Avenue to Astoria–Ditmars Boulevard via the 60th Street Tunnel and BMT Astoria Line on weekdays, stopping at 49th Street. The extended Q replaced the W, which was discontinued due to budget shortfalls.

On December 7, 2014, late night Q service began operating local in Manhattan between 57th Street and Canal Street in order to decrease waiting time at the local stations.

On November 7, 2016, weekday Q service was cut back from Astoria to 57th Street–Seventh Avenue, skipping 49th Street, to provide a seamless transition for the opening of the Second Avenue Subway. Service to Astoria and the 49th Street station was replaced by the restored W service.

On January 1, 2017, the first phase of the Second Avenue Subway opened; the Q was extended from 57th Street–Seventh Avenue to 96th Street via the BMT 63rd Street Line and the IND Second Avenue Line. This extension serves Lexington Avenue–63rd Street station with a cross-platform transfer to the IND 63rd Street Line (served by the F and M trains) before serving new stations under Second Avenue at 72nd Street, 86th Street, and 96th Street, where it originates/terminates. The inaugural train on the Second Avenue Line ran on December 31, 2016, with passenger service beginning the next day. From January 1 to 9, 2017, service between 57th Street and 96th Street ran only from 6 a.m. to 10 p.m., with late-night service terminating at 57th Street; late night service to 96th Street began on January 9.

Effective June 30, 2024, one evening PM train started terminating at Brighton Beach.

=== Future ===
The second phase of the Second Avenue Line will extend the Q to a new northern terminal at Harlem–125th Street, with planned stops at 116th Street and 106th Street. At the Harlem–125th Street terminus, there will be a transfer to the existing 125th Street station on the IRT Lexington Avenue Line and a connection to Harlem–125th Street station on Metro-North Railroad. This will provide residents of East Harlem with direct subway service to the Upper East Side, western Midtown, Lower Manhattan and Brooklyn, and offer connections to 4, 5, 6, and <6> trains and Metro-North from the Bronx, the northern suburbs of New York City, and southern Connecticut. An extension of the Second Avenue Line further west under 125th Street has been proposed, with transfers to other routes, although this extension has not been funded or approved.

== Route ==
=== Pre-1967 ===
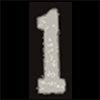
The BMT 1 bullet used on the D Triplex

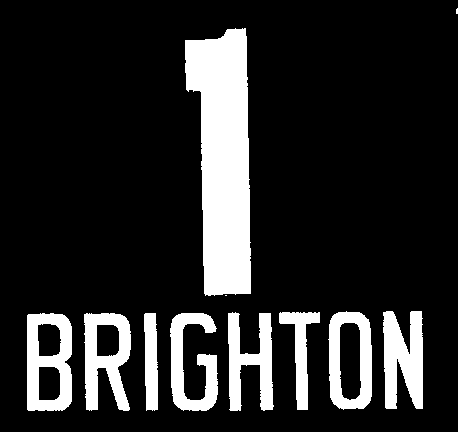
Pre-1967 BMT 1 bullet used on the R1s to R9s

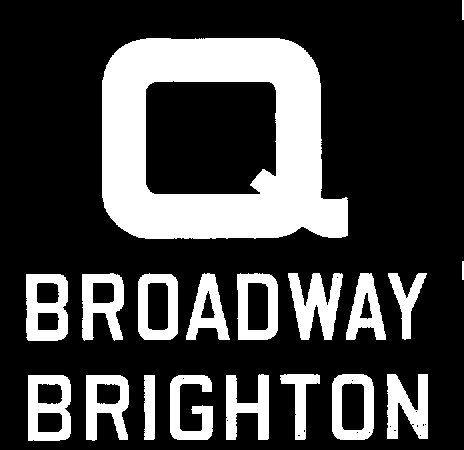
The BMT Q bullet used on the R27s and R32s

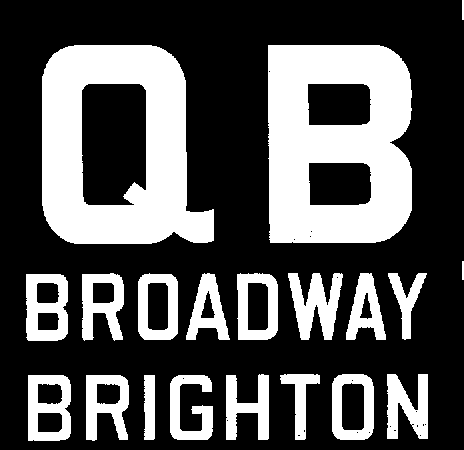
The BMT QB bullet used on the R27s and R32s

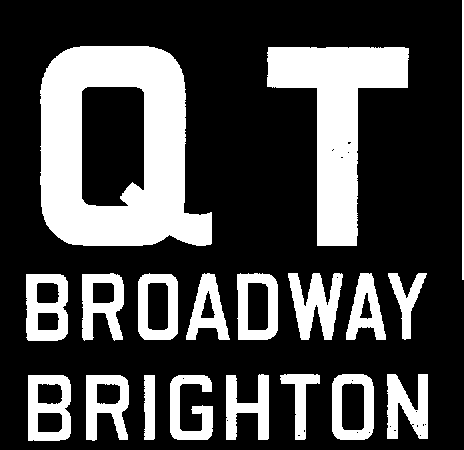
The BMT QT bullet used on the R27s and R32s

=== 1967-1985 ===
1967-1979 QB bullet

1967-1973 QJ bullet

1979-1985 QB bullet

=== 1985-present ===
1985-1988 & 2001-2004 Rush hour bullet

1988-2001 bullet for the IND Sixth Avenue Line

The current bullet used since 1985

=== Service pattern ===
The following table shows the lines used by the Q, with shaded boxes indicating the route at the specified times:

Line	From	To	Tracks	Times	
Line	From	To	Tracks	all ex. nights	late nights
IND Second Avenue Line	96th Street	72nd Street	all		
BMT 63rd Street Line (full line)	Lexington Avenue–63rd Street		all		
BMT Broadway Line	57th Street–Seventh Avenue	Canal Street	express		
BMT Broadway Line	57th Street–Seventh Avenue	Canal Street	local		
Manhattan Bridge			south		
BMT Brighton Line (full line)	DeKalb Avenue	Prospect Park	all		
BMT Brighton Line (full line)	Parkside Avenue	Ocean Parkway	local		
BMT Brighton Line (full line)	West Eighth Street–New York Aquarium	Coney Island–Stillwell Avenue	all		

=== Stations ===
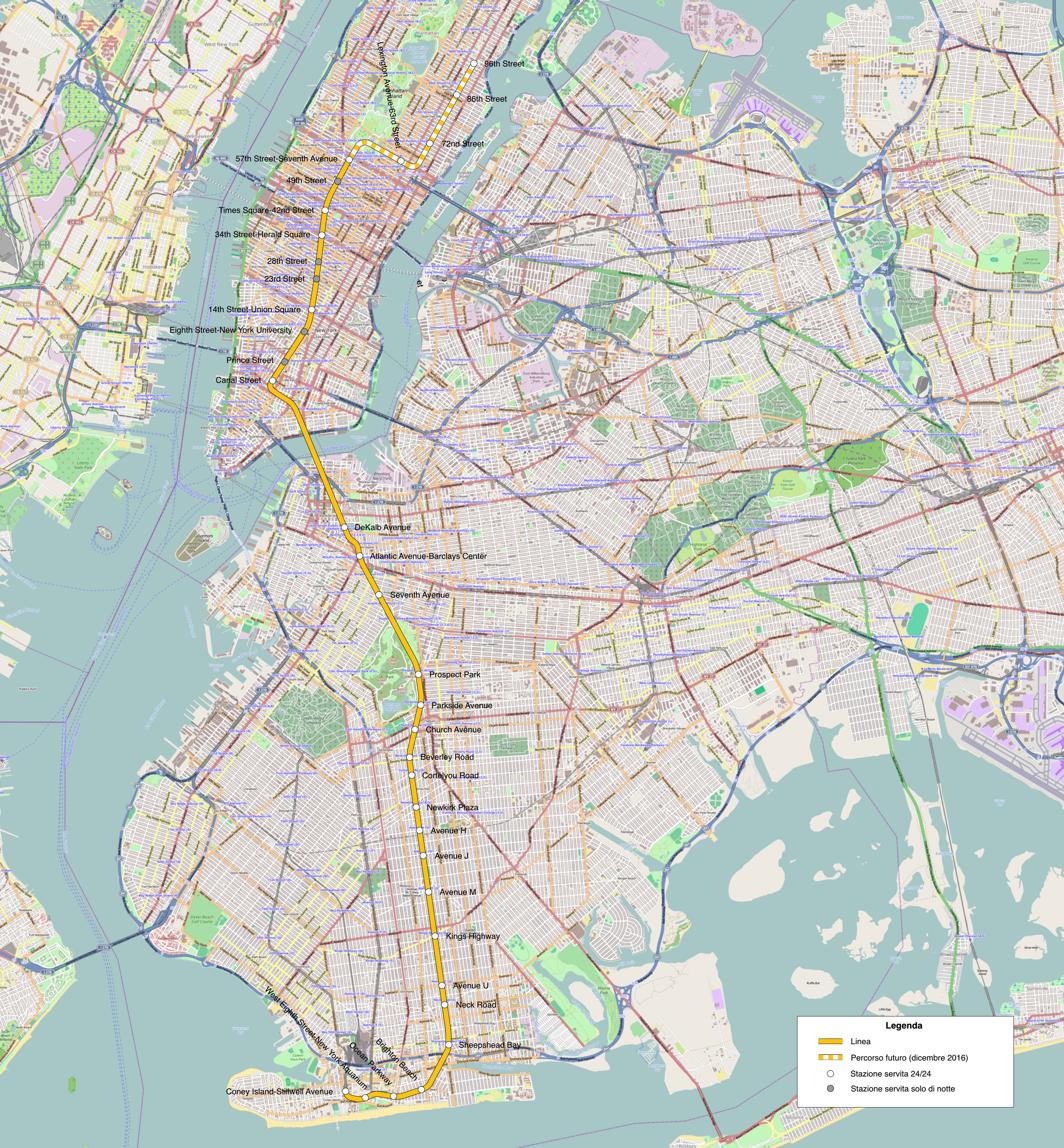
To scale line map

For a more detailed station listing, see the articles on the lines listed above.

Station service legend
Stops all times	Stops 24 hours a day
Stops all times except late nights	Stops every day during daytime hours only
Stops late nights only	Stops every day during overnight hours only
Stops weekdays during the day	Stops during weekday daytime hours only
Stops rush hours in the peak direction only	Stops during weekday rush hours in the peak direction only
Stops rush hours only	Stops rush hours only (limited service)
Time period details
Disabled access	Station is compliant with the Americans with Disabilities Act
↑	Station is compliant with the Americans with Disabilities Act in the indicated direction only
↓	Station is compliant with the Americans with Disabilities Act in the indicated direction only
	Elevator access to mezzanine only

Q service to 96 St	Stations	Disabled access	Subway transfers	Connections and notes
Manhattan
Second Avenue Line
Stops all times	96th Street	Disabled access	N	M15 Select Bus Service
Stops all times	86th Street	Disabled access	N R	M15 Select Bus Service; M86 Select Bus Service
Stops all times	72nd Street	Disabled access	N R	M15 Select Bus Service
63rd Street Line
Stops all times	Lexington Avenue–63rd Street	Disabled access	F M N R Out-of-system transfers with MetroCard/OMNY: 4 5 6 <6> (IRT Lexington Avenue Line at 59th Street); N R W (BMT Broadway Line at Lexington Avenue–59th Street)	
Broadway Line
Stops all times	57th Street–Seventh Avenue	Disabled access	N R W	
Stops late nights only	49th Street	↑	N	Station is ADA-accessible in the northbound direction only
Stops all times	Times Square–42nd Street	Disabled access	N R W 1 2 3 (IRT Broadway–Seventh Avenue Line); 7 <7> (IRT Flushing Line); A C E (IND Eighth Avenue Line at 42nd Street–Port Authority Bus Terminal); S (42nd Street Shuttle); B D F <F> M (IND Sixth Avenue Line at 42nd Street–Bryant Park, daytime only)	Port Authority Bus Terminal; M34A Select Bus Service
Stops all times	34th Street–Herald Square	Disabled access	N R W B D F <F> M (IND Sixth Avenue Line)	M34 / M34A Select Bus Service; PATH at 33rd Street; Amtrak, LIRR, NJ Transit at Pennsylvania Station
Stops late nights only	28th Street		N	
Stops late nights only	23rd Street		N	M23 Select Bus Service
Stops all times	14th Street–Union Square	Disabled access	N R W L (BMT Canarsie Line); 4 5 6 <6> (IRT Lexington Avenue Line)	M14A / M14D Select Bus Service
Stops late nights only	Eighth Street–New York University		N	
Stops late nights only	Prince Street		N	
Manhattan Bridge branch
Stops all times	Canal Street	Elevator access to mezzanine only	N R W 4 6 <6> (IRT Lexington Avenue Line); J Z (BMT Nassau Street Line)	Stops on the lower level
Brooklyn
Brighton Line
Stops all times	DeKalb Avenue	Disabled access	B D N R W	
Stops all times	Atlantic Avenue–Barclays Center	Disabled access	B D N R W (BMT Fourth Avenue Line); 2 3 4 5 (IRT Eastern Parkway Line)	LIRR Atlantic Branch at Atlantic Terminal
Stops all times	Seventh Avenue		B	
Stops all times	Prospect Park	Disabled access	B S (BMT Franklin Avenue Line)	
Stops all times	Parkside Avenue			
Stops all times	Church Avenue	Disabled access	B	
Stops all times	Beverley Road			
Stops all times	Cortelyou Road			
Stops all times	Newkirk Plaza		B	
Stops all times	Avenue H	Disabled access		
Stops all times	Avenue J			
Stops all times	Avenue M			
Stops all times	Kings Highway	Disabled access	B	B82 Select Bus Service
Stops all times	Avenue U			
Stops all times	Neck Road			
Stops all times	Sheepshead Bay	Disabled access	B	
Stops all times	Brighton Beach		B	Southern terminal for one weekday evening train (Note: One southbound Q train terminates at this station during weekday evenings only)
Stops all times	Ocean Parkway			
Stops all times	West Eighth Street–New York Aquarium		F <F> (IND Culver Line)	
Stops all times	Coney Island–Stillwell Avenue	Disabled access	N D (BMT West End Line); F <F> (IND Culver Line)	
