= B (New York City Subway service) =

Rapid transit service

- Sixth Avenue Express

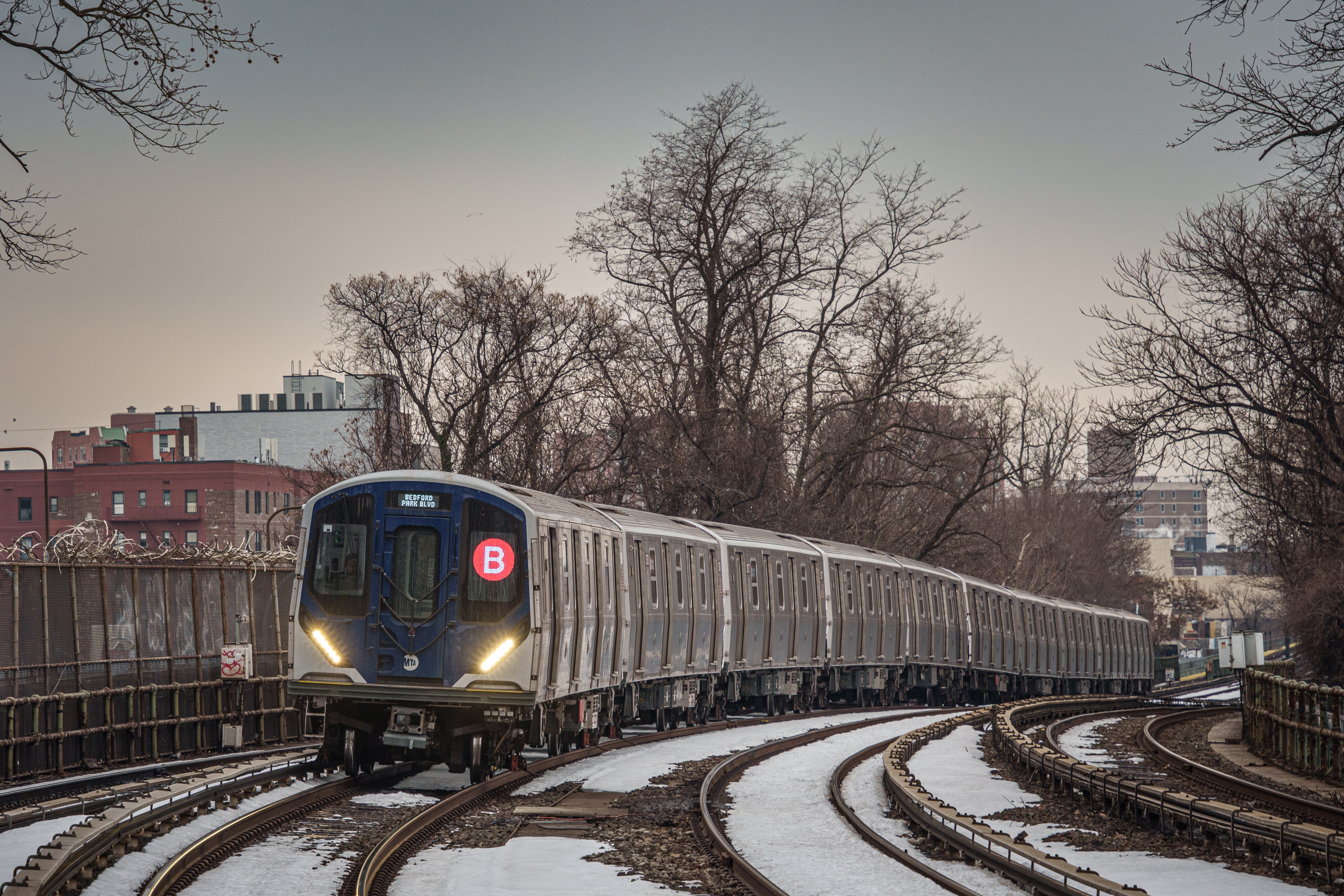
- A Manhattan-bound B train of R211As approaching Sheepshead Bay.

- Northern end: Bedford Park Boulevard or 145th Street (limited middays and all evenings)
- Southern end: Brighton Beach
- Stations: 37; 27 (limited midday and all evening service)
- Rolling stock: R68; R68A; R211A (Rolling stock assignments subject to change)
- Depot: Coney Island Yard
- Started service: December 15, 1940; 85 years ago

The B Sixth Avenue Express (Note: The Metropolitan Transportation Authority's official text map gives the route's name as the "B Central Park West Local/Sixth Avenue Express".) is a rapid transit service in the B Division of the New York City Subway. Its route emblem, or "bullet", is colored orange, since it uses the IND Sixth Avenue Line in Midtown Manhattan.

The B operates on weekdays during daytime hours only. Rush hour and midday service operates between Bedford Park Boulevard in the Bronx and Brighton Beach in Brooklyn. The route makes all stops in the Bronx and Upper Manhattan, and express stops in Midtown Manhattan (between 34th and West Fourth Streets) and in Brooklyn. Limited midday and all evening service short turns at 145th Street in Manhattan, rather than operating all the way to and from Bedford Park Boulevard.

From the opening of the IND Sixth Avenue Line in 1940 until November 25, 1967, the B ran exclusively in Manhattan, as the BB, from 168th Street in Washington Heights during rush hours to 34th Street–Herald Square in Midtown Manhattan. Upon the opening of the Chrystie Street Connection on November 26, 1967, the B started running via the BMT West End Line (local) and BMT Fourth Avenue Line (express) in Brooklyn and ran over the Manhattan Bridge directly from Sixth Avenue. A short-lived B service marked with a yellow bullet ran via the BMT Broadway Line in Manhattan and the BMT West End Line in Brooklyn from 1986 to 1988 due to Manhattan Bridge renovation, while an orange B service traveled the BB route between 168th and 34th Streets. After 1989, the B north of 47th–50th Streets–Rockefeller Center used the IND Eighth Avenue Line to 168th Street on weekdays, and the IND 63rd Street Line on evenings and weekends. Late night service ran as a shuttle on the West End Line. Weekday service was rerouted to the Concourse Line in 1998, while off-peak service along 63rd Street ceased in 2000. The B started using the Brighton Line in 2004 after work on the north side of the Manhattan Bridge was completed.

== History ==
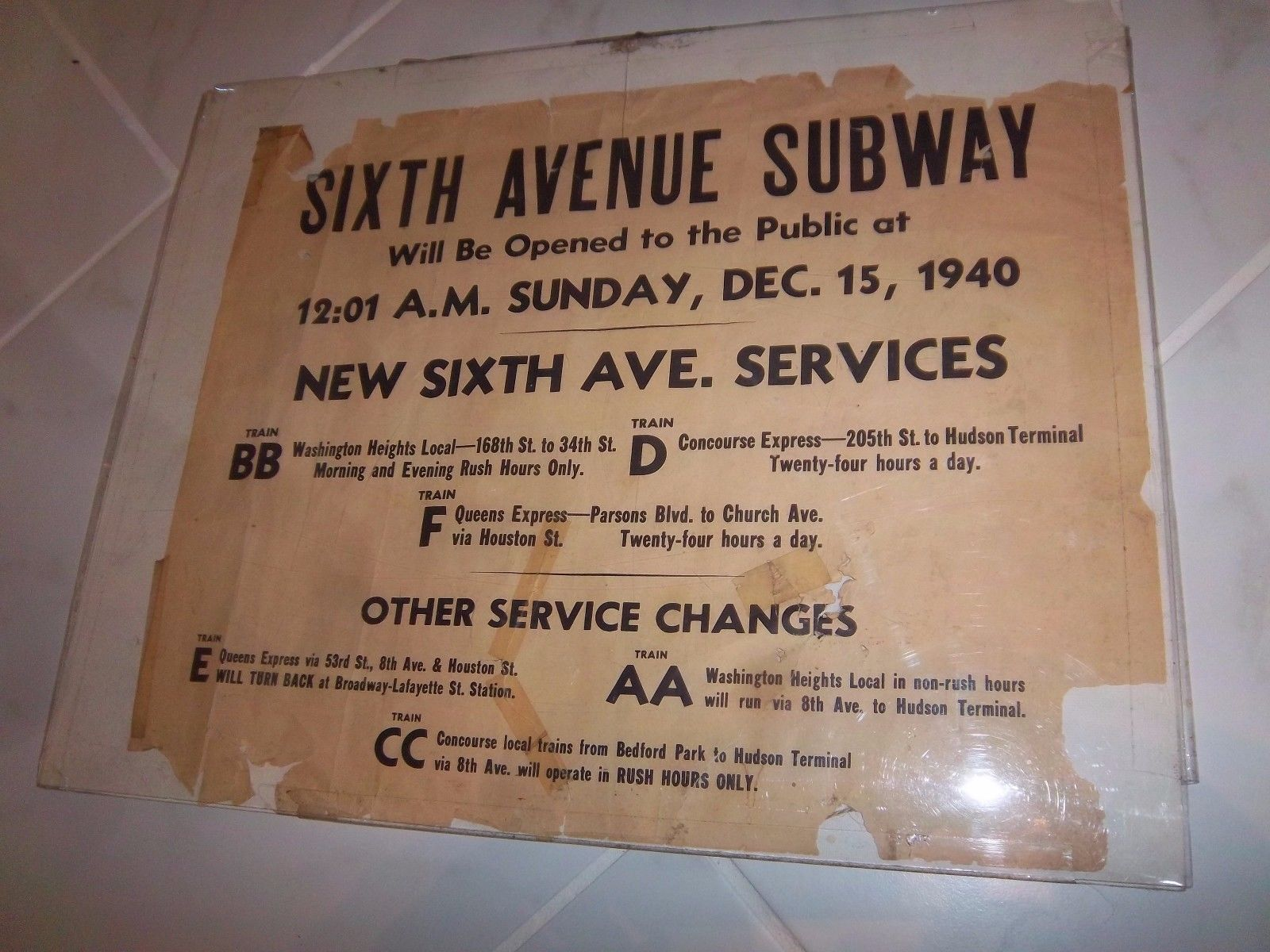
A poster notifying the opening of the Sixth Avenue Subway at 12:01 a.m. on December 15, 1940

The designation B was originally intended for express trains originating from the Washington Heights neighborhood of Manhattan and operating in Midtown Manhattan on the IND Sixth Avenue Line. However, the express "B" designation was not used until 1967. Instead, beginning with the opening of the Sixth Avenue Line on December 15, 1940, local trains operated between 168th Street–Washington Heights and 34th Street–Herald Square during weekday rush hours and Saturday mornings and early afternoons. On January 5, 1952, Saturday service was discontinued; Saturday service last ran on December 29, 1951. This service was designated "BB", conforming with the Independent Subway System (IND) convention using double letters to indicate local services.

=== Chrystie Street Connection ===
The Chrystie Street Connection and the express tracks of the Sixth Avenue Line opened on November 26, 1967, changing service. BB trains were combined with the former T service which was soon closed, ran on the BMT West End Line in Brooklyn and the BMT Broadway Line in Manhattan. This created a through service between 168th Street and Coney Island–Stillwell Avenue via the Sixth Avenue Line express tracks, the Manhattan Bridge, Fourth Avenue, and the West End, and was labeled as B. Weekday midday and daytime Saturday service operated between West Fourth Street and Stillwell Avenue. Overnight and Sunday service was provided by TT shuttle service between 36th Street and Stillwell Avenue. On July 1, 1968, the B was rerouted to terminate at the new 57th Street–Sixth Avenue station in Midtown Manhattan during weekday middays and evenings, only serving 168th Street during weekday rush hours. The West End Line TT shuttles and label were discontinued, being absorbed into the B service.

On June 1, 1976, the New York City Transit Authority (NYCTA) announced changes in subway service that were expected to save $12.6 million annually and were the third phase of the agency's plan to realign subway service to better reflect ridership patterns and reduced ridership. As part of the changes, which took effect on August 30, 1976, B service began running between 57th Street and Coney Island 24 hours, replacing K service, which had formerly run along 6th Avenue from the BMT Jamaica Line. Alternate B trains commenced operating between 168th Street and Coney Island (via West End express in the peak direction) during weekday rush hours. However, on December 14, 1976, the NYCTA announced severe cuts in bus and subway service in order to cut its budget by $30 million over the following 18 months in order to achieve a balanced budget, at the request of the Emergency Financial Control Board. As part of the cuts, overnight B service was cut back to running as a shuttle between 36th Street and Stillwell Avenue via the West End Line. This change took effect on August 27, 1977. Initially, the 57th Street station was to be closed during late nights. However, a separate B shuttle also operated overnights between 57th Street and 47th–50th Streets–Rockefeller Center.

The NYCTA approved four changes in subway service on April 27, 1981, including an increase in B service. The changes were made as part of the $1 million, two-year Rapid Transit Sufficiency Study, and were expected to take place as early as 1982, following public hearings and approval by the Metropolitan Transportation Authority (MTA) board. As part of the changes, midday B service was going to be increased, replacing AA service. B service on the West End Line and Fourth Avenue Line express was to be supplemented by a new rush hour T train, running between Bay Parkway and Chambers Street on the Nassau Street Line.

On June 1, 1983, the NYCTA proposed changes to increase service along Sixth Avenue and better connecting the line to the Bronx and Queens. As part of the changes, B train service would run to 168th Street at all times, with service to 57th Street during non-rush hours replaced by a new H train running between 57th Street and World Trade Center. With the extension of B service to 168th Street, AA service would be eliminated. The changes would have gone into effect in spring or summer 1984, pending approval by the MTA board.

=== Manhattan Bridge reconstruction (1986 to 2004) ===
==== 1980s ====
The reconstruction of the Manhattan Bridge between 1986 and 2004 affected B service as the bridge's north side tracks, which led to the Sixth Avenue Line, were closed multiple times. These closures severed the connection between the northern and southern portions of the route. B service was split into two different services starting on April 26, 1986, with an expected completion date of October 26, 1986. The closure of the bridge's north side tracks caused the return of pre-November 1967 service patterns, before the opening of the Chrystie Street Connection: The orange B duplicated the former BB service, and the yellow B imitated the old T service, except for the fact that it used the Manhattan Bridge rather than the Montague Street Tunnel, as the T had. The northern B service ran via Sixth Avenue, using an orange diamond bullet, between 34th Street-Herald Square and 168th Street during rush hours only. The southern B service ran via the Manhattan Bridge and BMT Broadway Line, using a yellow bullet. It ran from Coney Island-Stillwell Avenue and terminated at Astoria–Ditmars Boulevard during rush hours; Queensboro Plaza middays, evenings, and weekends; and 36th Street late nights as a shuttle. The service running up to Astoria during rush-hours was marked with a yellow diamond bullet, to signify rush-hour service. Service to 57th Street and Grand Street on the IND Sixth Avenue Line was replaced by an S shuttle running between these two points via the Sixth Avenue local. The point of this shuttle was to provide service to the Grand Street Station on the Chrystie Street Connection directly from 6th Avenue, as the rush-hour 6th Avenue B only ran as far south as 34th Street-Herald Square. From April 28, 1986, to May 23, 1987, one PM rush hour yellow B train originated from Forest Hills – 71st Avenue instead of Ditmars Boulevard. On May 24, 1987, evening and weekend Broadway Line B service was cut back from Queensboro Plaza to 57th Street–Seventh Avenue.

Through B service on the Sixth Avenue Line to Coney Island via 4th Avenue and West End resumed December 11, 1988, when the Manhattan Bridge's north side tracks reopened. Due to increased demand for Sixth Avenue service along Central Park West, B trains were extended local to 168th Street on middays and evenings, partially replacing the discontinued K service. During late nights, the B continued to operate as the West End Shuttle from 36th Street to Coney Island. B service operated to 57th Street during weekends and N service was increased to replace the discontinued yellow B service to Ditmars Boulevard. In May 1989, Sunday afternoon service was increased to run every 10 minutes instead of every 12 minutes.

With the opening of the IND 63rd Street Line on October 29, 1989, B service was extended from 57th Street to 21st Street–Queensbridge on weekends. In addition, the span of through service on weekends between Brooklyn and Manhattan was increased from 17 to 19 hours. The last Brooklyn-bound through train was the train leaving 57th Street at 1:12 a.m. as opposed to the one leaving at 12:11 a.m., and the first Manhattan-bound through trains were leaving Coney Island at 5:01 a.m. Saturdays and 5:21 a.m. Sundays, compared to 5:42 a.m. Saturday and 6:21 a.m. Sunday trains. Weekday service was also slightly modified, with Stillwell Avenue-bound trains running local along Fourth Avenue in Brooklyn until 8 a.m. instead of 7 a.m.

==== 1990s ====
On September 30, 1990, weekday evening B service was rerouted via the 63rd Street Line and originated and terminated at 21st Street–Queensbridge to replace evening orange Q service along the line; as a result, A trains made all stops between 145th and 168th Streets in place of the B during this time. B trains stopped operating between 168th Street and 47th–50th Streets–Rockefeller Center between 8:15 p.m. and 6:45 a.m., saving the NYCTA $1.35 million annually. Also on this date, because N service resumed running via the Manhattan Bridge, B trains began skipping DeKalb Avenue.

In January 1991, a reduction of service along the Central Park West corridor to remove excess capacity was proposed. B service would be rerouted via the 63rd Street Line every day during daytime hours and would originate and terminate at 21st Street–Queensbridge instead of 168th Street. Local service via Central Park West would be replaced by A trains; the service change was later amended for Central Park West Local service to be served by C trains instead. Overnight service would remain unchanged as a West End Shuttle between 36th Street and Stillwell Avenue. This service change would have been implemented in October 1991, pending approval from the MTA board.

The north side of the Manhattan Bridge closed on weekdays during midday hours and on weekends from April 30 until November 12, 1995. As a result, B trains operated as a shuttle between Pacific Street and Stillwell Avenue, making express stops via Fourth Avenue and all stops via the West End Line.

From February 22, 1998, to May 22, 1999, weekday evening and weekend daytime B service originated and terminated at 57th Street/Sixth Avenue instead of 21st Street–Queensbridge due to track and tunnel reconstruction of the IND 63rd Street Line; service along that line was replaced by a shuttle service that operated between 21st Street and either 57th Street/Seventh Avenue or 34th Street–Herald Square via the Broadway Line every 20 minutes and was marked with a yellow S bullet. The 57th Street station was closed from 12:30 to 6 a.m. every day during the project. The project had initially been slated to be completed in fall 1999, but normal service resumed in May 1999, ahead of schedule.

The B and C switched northern terminals on March 1, 1998, ending the connection between the B and Washington Heights. The B was routed onto the IND Concourse Line and originated and terminated at Bedford Park Boulevard during weekday rush hours; weekday midday service short-turned at 145th Street and did not operate to or from Bedford Park Boulevard. The change was made to reduce crowding on the C and to reduce passenger confusion about the C's route.

==== 2000s ====
C service was suspended from January 29 to February 14, 2000 due to switch replacement work north of the World Trade Center station, preventing it from being used as a terminal for E trains. As a result, weekday rush hour frequencies on the B was increased since it was the only line making all stops along Central Park West at the time. Weekend daytime service was extended beyond 145th Street to and from 168th Street.

On November 5, 2000, weekday evening and weekend daytime service was rerouted to 145th Street due to signal and track work along the IND 63rd Street Line, no longer operating to or from 21st Street–Queensbridge. A separate B Queensbridge Shuttle continued to operate via 63rd Street during the hours the Q was not running; service operated between 21st Street and 34th Street–Herald Square via the Broadway Line. This shuttle service operated weekday evenings and all weekend until January 2001 when the 63rd Street Connector east of 21st Street opened for weekend and overnight service diversions.

On July 22, 2001, the Manhattan Bridge's north side tracks closed and B service over the Manhattan Bridge was split into two services, similar to the 1986 changes. This time, the southern half of the route that ran via the Broadway Line was named the W. The W ran from Astoria to Coney Island via Broadway Express, the Manhattan Bridge, and 4th Avenue Express before running local on West End to Coney Island. B service ran on weekdays only, from 34th Street to Bedford Park Boulevard during rush hours and from 34th Street to 145th Street during middays and evenings.

After the September 11, 2001 attacks, B service was extended beyond Bedford Park Boulevard and originated and terminated at 205th Street with D trains, but was cut back to Bedford Park Boulevard by the evening of September 12.

=== 2004 to present ===
The Manhattan Bridge was fully reopened to subway service on February 22, 2004. B and D trains were once again extended through Grand Street station and over the Manhattan Bridge's north tracks into Brooklyn. However, rather than returning to the West End Line which it had served from 1967 to 2001, the B now ran express on the BMT Brighton Line to Brighton Beach (replacing the diamond express <Q>) that had run from July 2001 until February 2004, in order to combine two weekday-only services, while the D replaced the B on the West End Line, running express on the BMT Fourth Avenue Line in Brooklyn. B service now operates between Brighton Beach and Bedford Park Boulevard during rush hours and Brighton Beach and 145th Street on weekday middays and evenings.

From September 14, 2009, to October 3, 2011, B trains ran local in Brooklyn due to station renovations on the Brighton Line.

In July 2019, the MTA introduced a proposal to end late evening service. Instead, B service would end around 9:30 PM, which it previously did prior to July 2008. In their proposal, the MTA noted that service often ended early on weeknights to accommodate planned work.

From March 2020 to June 8, 2020, the B was temporarily suspended due to lack of ridership and train crew availability caused by the COVID-19 pandemic. From December 30, 2021, to January 19, 2022, B service was again suspended due to a shortage of crew members exacerbated by the COVID-19 pandemic.

On July 1, 2024, midday service was increased to run every eight minutes instead of every ten minutes and alternate B trains were extended to Bedford Park Boulevard. From August 5, 2024, until February 24, 2025, B trains operated local between Prospect Park and Kings Highway in both directions for facilitating accessibility upgrades at the Church Avenue station.

== Route ==
=== Signage history ===
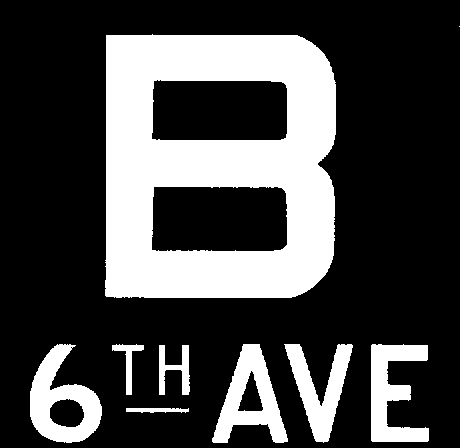
The B (express) bullet, which was replaced by the BB

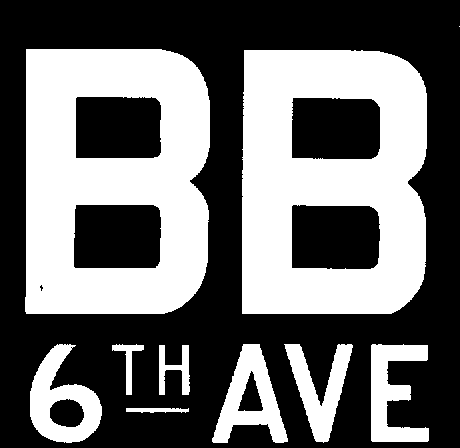
Pre-1967 BB bullet used on the R1s to R38s

1967–1979 bullet

1979-1988 & 1998-2005 Rush hour bullet

1986-1988 bullet for the BMT Broadway Line

1986-1988 Rush hour bullet for the BMT Broadway Line

The current bullet used since 1979

=== Service pattern ===
The following table shows the lines used by the B, with shaded boxes indicating the route at the specified times:

Line	From	To	Tracks	Times	
Line	From	To	Tracks	weekdays	evenings
IND Concourse Line	Bedford Park Boulevard	155th Street	local		
IND Concourse Line	145th Street		all		
IND Eighth Avenue Line	135th Street	59th Street–Columbus Circle	local		
IND Sixth Avenue Line	Seventh Avenue/53rd Street	Broadway–Lafayette Street	express		
Chrystie Street Connection	Grand Street		all		
Manhattan Bridge			north		
BMT Brighton Line	DeKalb Avenue	Brighton Beach	express		

=== Stations ===
For a more detailed station listing, see the articles on the lines listed above.

Station service legend
Stops all times	Stops 24 hours a day
Stops all times except late nights	Stops every day during daytime hours only
Stops weekdays during the day	Stops during weekday daytime hours only
Stops all times except rush hours in the peak direction	Stops 24 hours a day, except during weekday rush hours in the peak direction
Station closed	Station closed
Stops rush hours in the peak direction only	Stops weekdays in the peak direction only
Time period details
Disabled access	Station is compliant with the Americans with Disabilities Act
↑	Station is compliant with the Americans with Disabilities Act in the indicated direction only
↓	Station is compliant with the Americans with Disabilities Act in the indicated direction only
	Elevator access to mezzanine only

B service	Stations	Disabled access	Subway transfers	Connections and notes
The Bronx
Concourse Line
Stops weekdays during the day	Bedford Park Boulevard	Disabled access	D	Northern terminal for all rush hour and one-half of midday trains.
Stops weekdays during the day	Kingsbridge Road	Disabled access	D	Some northbound a.m. rush hour trips terminate at this station
Stops weekdays during the day	Fordham Road		D	Bx12 Select Bus Service
Stops weekdays during the day	182nd–183rd Streets		D	Skipped by trains terminating at Kingsbridge Road
Stops weekdays during the day	Tremont Avenue	Disabled access	D	
Stops weekdays during the day	174th–175th Streets		D	
Stops weekdays during the day	170th Street		D	
Stops weekdays during the day	167th Street		D	
Stops weekdays during the day	161st Street–Yankee Stadium	Disabled access	D 4 (IRT Jerome Avenue Line)	Bx6 Select Bus Service; Metro-North Hudson Line at Yankees–East 153rd Street
Manhattan
Stops weekdays during the day	155th Street		D	
Stops weekdays during the day	145th Street		D A C (IND Eighth Avenue Line)	Northern terminal for some midday and all evening trains.
Eighth Avenue Line
Stops weekdays during the day	135th Street		C	
Stops weekdays during the day	125th Street	Disabled access	A C D	M60 Select Bus Service to LaGuardia Airport
Stops weekdays during the day	116th Street		C	
Stops weekdays during the day	Cathedral Parkway–110th Street		C	
Stops weekdays during the day	103rd Street		C	
Stops weekdays during the day	96th Street		C	
Stops weekdays during the day	86th Street		C	M86 Select Bus Service
Stops weekdays during the day	81st Street–Museum of Natural History		C	M79 Select Bus Service
Stops weekdays during the day	72nd Street		C	
Stops weekdays during the day	59th Street–Columbus Circle	Disabled access	A C D 1 (IRT Broadway–Seventh Avenue Line)	
Sixth Avenue Line
Stops weekdays during the day	Seventh Avenue/53rd Street		D E (IND Queens Boulevard Line)	
Stops weekdays during the day	47th–50th Streets–Rockefeller Center	Disabled access	D F <F> M	
Stops weekdays during the day	42nd Street–Bryant Park	Elevator access to mezzanine only	D F <F> M 7 <7> (IRT Flushing Line at Fifth Avenue); 1 2 3 (IRT Broadway–Seventh Avenue Line at Times Square–42nd Street, daytime only); N Q R W (BMT Broadway Line at Times Square–42nd Street, daytime only); S (42nd Street Shuttle at Times Square, daytime only); A C E (IND Eighth Avenue Line at 42nd Street–Port Authority Bus Terminal, daytime only)	
Stops weekdays during the day	34th Street–Herald Square	Disabled access	D F <F> M N Q R W (BMT Broadway Line)	M34 / M34A Select Bus Service; PATH at 33rd Street; Amtrak, LIRR, NJ Transit at Pennsylvania Station
Stops weekdays during the day	West Fourth Street–Washington Square	Disabled access	D F <F> M A C E (IND Eighth Avenue Line)	PATH at Ninth Street
Stops weekdays during the day	Broadway–Lafayette Street	Disabled access	D F <F> M 6 <6> (IRT Lexington Avenue Line at Bleecker Street)	
Chrystie Street Branch
Stops weekdays during the day	Grand Street		D	
Brooklyn
Brighton Line
Stops weekdays during the day	DeKalb Avenue	Disabled access	N Q R W	
Stops weekdays during the day	Atlantic Avenue–Barclays Center	Disabled access	Q D N R W (BMT Fourth Avenue Line); 2 3 4 5 (IRT Eastern Parkway Line)	LIRR Atlantic Branch at Atlantic Terminal
Stops weekdays during the day	Seventh Avenue		Q	
Stops weekdays during the day	Prospect Park	Disabled access	Q S (BMT Franklin Avenue Line)	
Stops weekdays during the day	Church Avenue	Disabled access	Q	
Stops weekdays during the day	Newkirk Plaza		Q	
Stops weekdays during the day	Kings Highway	Disabled access	Q	B82 Select Bus Service
Stops weekdays during the day	Sheepshead Bay	Disabled access	Q	
Stops weekdays during the day	Brighton Beach		Q	
