= West Midwood, Brooklyn =

West Midwood
- Neighborhood of Brooklyn
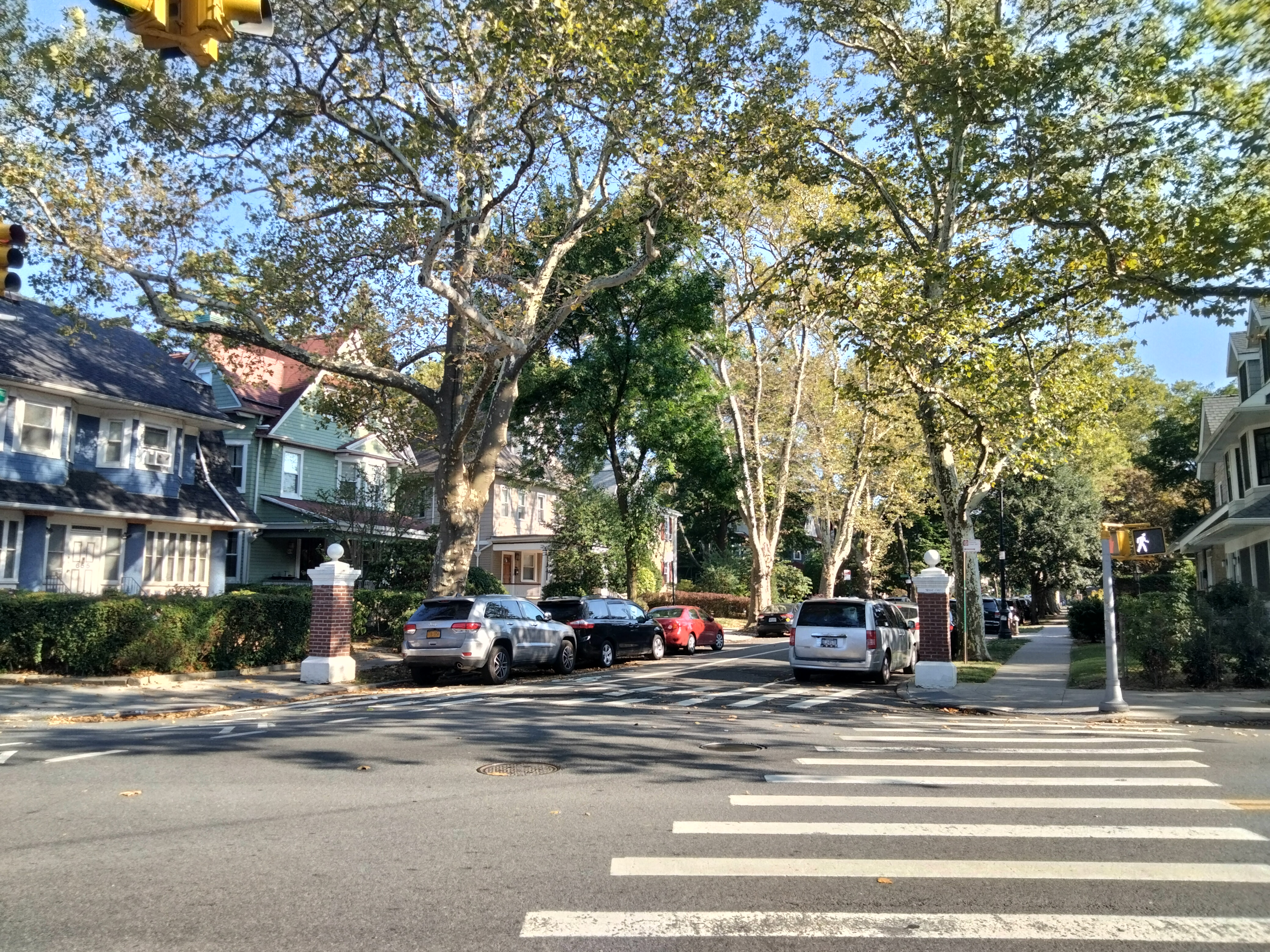
- West Midwood at the corner of Rugby Road and Foster Road
- Location in New York City
- Coordinates: 40.631°N 73.964°W
- Country: United States
- State: New York
- City: New York City
- Borough: Brooklyn
- Community District: Brooklyn 14
- ZIP Code: 11230
- Area codes: 718, 347, 929, and 917

West Midwood is a planned community and historic enclave in the New York City borough of Brooklyn. West Midwood is located in central Brooklyn in the southern edge of the community of Victorian Flatbush, abutting the northern boundary of the community of Midwood. It is bordered by Foster Avenue to the north, the BMT Brighton subway line (B and Q trains) to the east, Avenue H to the south, and Coney Island Avenue to the west. West Midwood is located south of Prospect Park within what is sometimes referred to as Ditmas Park.

West Midwood, along with other neighborhoods within Ditmas Park, is policed by the 70th Precinct of the New York City Police Department. West Midwood is part of Brooklyn Community District 14.

== History ==
Spurred by its success developing Vanderveer Park, the first Victorian Flatbush neighborhood, in 1899, the Germania Real Estate and Improvement Company (Germania) purchased the land on which West Midwood and neighboring communities Midwood Park and Fiske Terrace were to be built. The land was purchased from the Lott family’s extensive farmland holdings, which dated back over 200 years to Peter Lott, who migrated to Flatbush, from Holland in 1652. V’lacks Bos (Anglicized Flatbush), meaning “wooded plain” in Dutch, also carried the name Midwout (Anglicized Midwood), meaning “middle-woods” in Dutch, and the names both reflected the wooded nature of the area and contrasted against Flatlands, an area to the south that was devoid of woods.

In addition to development by Germania, between 1905 and 1908, architect and builder Thomas Benton Ackerson’s eponymous T.B. Ackerson Company, simultaneously built and sold forty-two detached homes along Westminster Road in West Midwood for $10,000 each. Design and construction of these houses conformed to Ackerson’s “village in the city” vision and houses were graced with columns and fine details. Similarly, Germania advertised the neighborhood as “country living in the city.” To maintain its suburban aesthetic, utilities and train tracks were kept underground and streets were lined with trees, mainly London Planes and maples. Further keeping with the park-like ambiance, the original property deeds forbade construction of front yard fences.

In keeping with West Midwood’s small-town character, residents host annual community-building events such as a Progressive Dinner, a Halloween Parade for the children of Flatbush, and a summer block party, in addition to publishing a seasonal newsletter, among other activities. New residents are invited to join the West Midwood Community Association, which dates back to the neighborhood’s early years.

== Transportation ==
New York City Subway stations serving West Midwood are Newkirk Plaza (B and Q trains) and Avenue H (Q train). MTA buses traveling through the area include the B8 and B68. Bike lanes connect West Midwood to greater Victorian Flatbush, Cortelyou Road, Prospect Park and its Parade Ground, Brooklyn College, and Ocean Parkway.
