= Victorian Flatbush =

Neighborhood of Brooklyn in New York City

Coordinates: 40.640449°N 73.960801°W

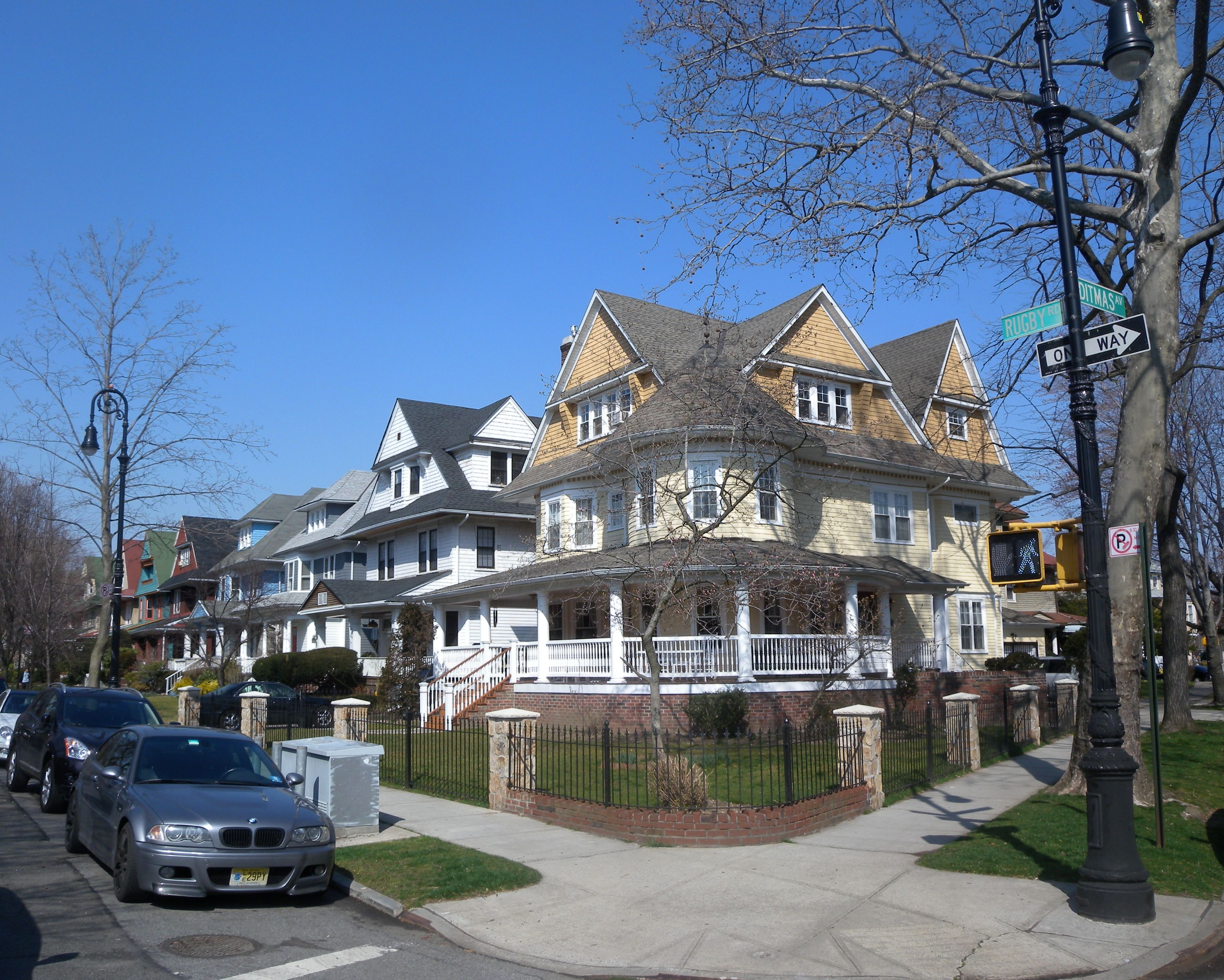
House at Ditmas Avenue and Rugby Road in the Ditmas Park Historic District

Victorian Flatbush is the western section of the Flatbush section of Brooklyn, New York, bordering Midwood, that is characterized by Victorian houses.

== History ==
The neighborhoods of Victorian Flatbush were developed in the early twentieth century from farmland in the former village of Flatbush, in response to the construction of the Brooklyn Rapid Transit line to Coney Island, and are some of the earliest suburbs. Developers including Dean Alvord, Lewis Pounds and particularly Thomas Benton Ackerson sold the new developments as country living, under the name "The Village in the City". Utilities and the subway were buried underground, and the area was carefully laid out with tree-lined avenues, including the Flatbush Malls, and country clubs. The detached houses, many of them large and all distinct, were designed in fashionable styles including "Victorian, Queen Anne, shingle style, colonial revival, neo-Tudor, Spanish Mission and Georgian", with porches and columns, and in many cases bay windows, turrets, and stained glass, and the area resembles other parts of the US more than it does the rest of New York. It is one of the largest collections of Victorian houses in the country. There has been rezoning to guard against oversize buildings near Coney Island Avenue.

Victorian Flatbush is in the western part of Flatbush, bounded approximately by Prospect Park (Brooklyn) or Church Avenue in the north and Avenue H in the south, and by Flatbush Avenue in the east and Coney Island Avenue in the west. It includes a dozen neighborhoods or enclaves:

- Albemarle-Kenmore Terraces, designated a New York City historic district in July 1978
- The Beverley Squares, Beverley Square East and Beverley Square West, major focuses of Ackerson's building
- Caton Park, sometimes called NoProPaSo (North of Prospect Park South)
- Ditmas Park, Ditmas Park Historic District designated a historic district in July 1981
- Ditmas Park West
- Fiske Terrace, designated a historic district in March 2008 with Midwood Park
- Midwood Park, designated a historic district in March 2008 with Fiske Terrace
- Newkirk
- Prospect Park South, designated a historic district in 1979
- South Midwood, bordering the Brooklyn College campus to the north
- West Midwood, with a large number of houses designed by Ackerson

The earliest development in Victorian Flatbush was the Tennis Court development, planned by Richard Ficken in the 1880s. These homes were bought and razed to build apartment buildings in the 1920s. The only remnants left of it are the eponymous street, and the Knickerbocker Field Club.

Many parts of Victorian Flatbush, particularly those centered on Cortelyou Road—Ditmas Park West and the Beverley Squares—are now considered part of Ditmas Park. It has also been identified with Midwood.

The Flatbush-Tompkins Congregational Church on 19th Street in the Ditmas Park Historic District, at which Conrad Tillard is since 2018 the Senior Minister, is often used for community meetings. Victorian Flatbush now includes five New York City historic districts, and residents of the sections that have not yet been designated city historic districts are working with the Flatbush Development Corporation and the Historic Districts Council to win designation.

=== Malls ===
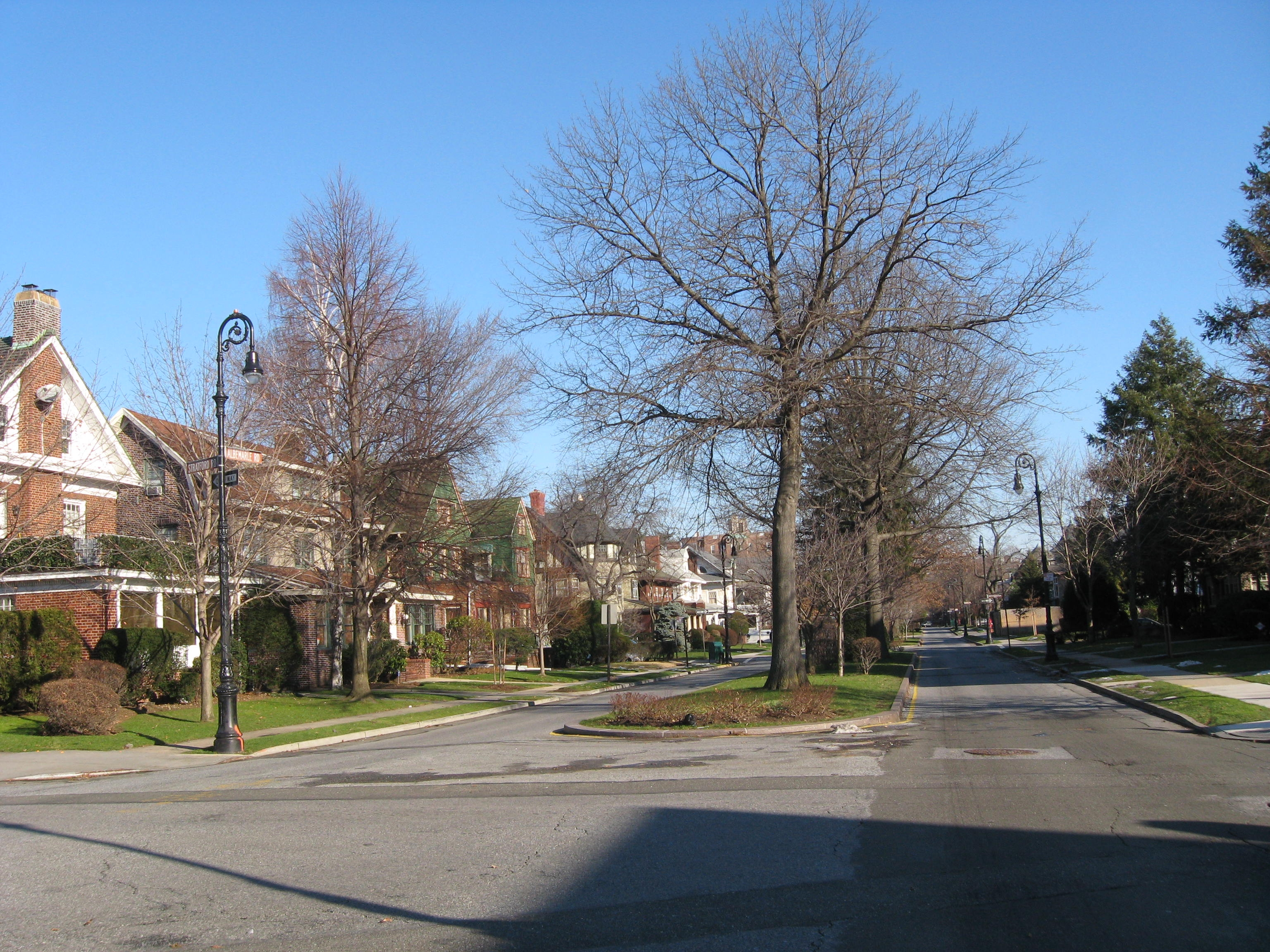
Flatbush Malls at Albemarle Road.

The Flatbush Malls are tree-lined landscaped medians series along several roads in Victorian Flatbush. An architecture critic has written that the malls "give the streets an uncommon spaciousness, if not grandeur". The first series was built in the northern part of the neighborhood along Albemarle Road, and extending one block north on Buckingham Road, in the Prospect Park South development of 1899, east of Coney Island Avenue and west of the BMT Brighton Line. This was modeled by the Scottish landscape architect John Aiken on Commonwealth Avenue Mall in Boston, with a design that originally included shrubbery but not trees, and in turn likely inspired the other neighborhood series.

The second series, also known as the Midwood Malls, was built in the southern part of the neighborhood along both Glenwood Road, east of Coney Island Avenue and west of Delamere Place, as well as the intersecting East 17th Street, north of the Long Island Railroad cut of the Bay Ridge Branch and south of Foster Avenue, in the Fiske Terrace-Midwood Park developments of 1905.

Part of the malls extending to Flatbush Avenue on Glenwood Road were removed starting in 1932. Both series of malls feature cul-de-sacs on the Brighton Line, with the Glenwood Road series extending to both sides and also having one on the Long Island Railroad cut. All-way stops are installed on the Glenwood Road series, and another was added to the Albemarle Road series due to traffic safety concerns. There has also been concern about the watering of the malls. Both series of malls are owned by the New York City Department of Transportation but maintained by the New York City Department of Parks and Recreation as part of the Greenstreets partnership.
