= Beverley Squares =

Neighborhoods of Brooklyn in New York City

Coordinates: 40°38′30″N 73°57′54″W

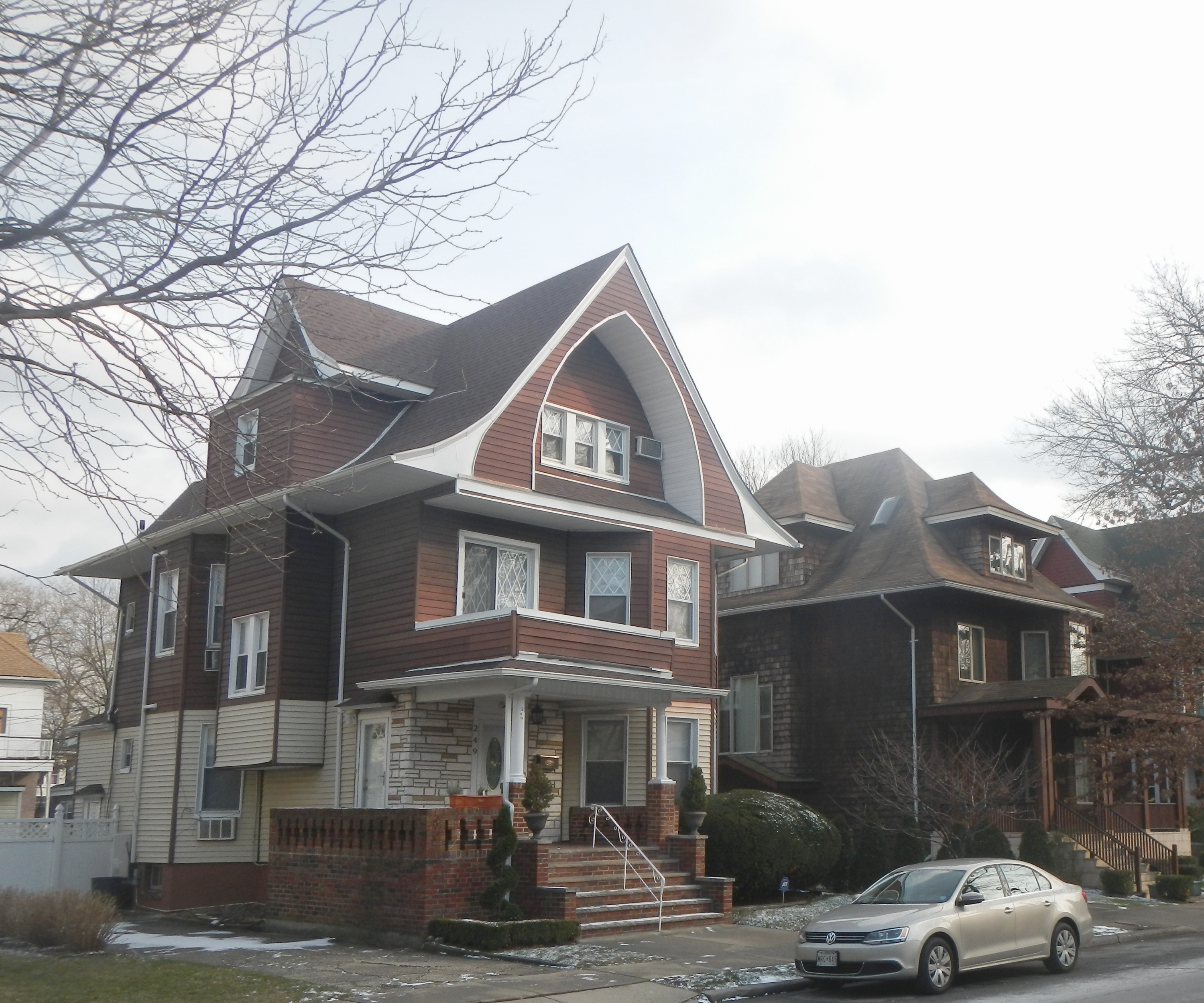
Argyle Road, Beverly Square West

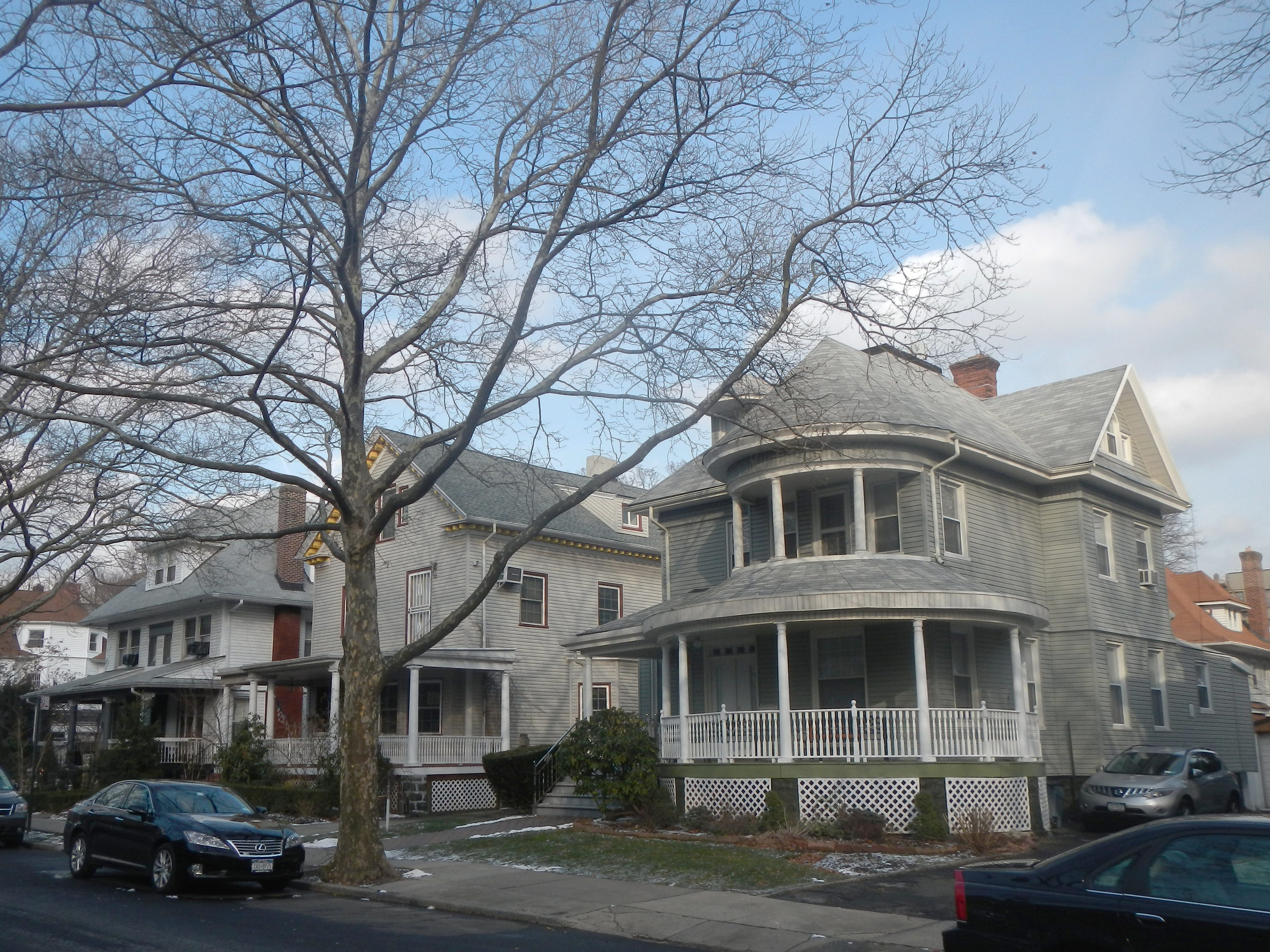
East 16th Street, Beverly Square East

Beverley Square East and Beverley Square West, also spelled Beverly Square, are a pair of neighborhoods in the Flatbush section of the New York City borough of Brooklyn. Located southwest of Prospect Park within what is now called Victorian Flatbush, one of the largest concentrations of Victorian houses in the United States, they were developed in the 1900s primarily by Thomas Benton Ackerson, whose former home is in Beverley Square West.

== Context and construction ==
The two neighborhoods extend from Beverley Road in the north (south of Prospect Park South) to Cortelyou Road in the south. The cut for the BMT Brighton Line of the New York City Subway between Marlborough Road (East 15th Street) and East 16th Street forms the boundary between them: Beverley Square East extends east from there to East 19th Street, and Beverley Square West west from there to Stratford or Argyle Road. Four of the five north-south streets in the development were renamed for a British high tone. The Beverley Squares, like most of Victorian Flatbush, were built on rural land. Ackerson organized his development company in order to develop Beverley Square East, beginning work in 1898 with a line of large houses along East 19th Street. Beverley Square West was built on Catherine Lott's farm, which Ackerson acquired in 1901.

Ackerson arranged for there to be subway stations on the new Brooklyn Rapid Transit line at both the north and the south ends of the two neighborhoods, only a block apart, the two closest open stations in the New York City Subway system: Beverley Road and Cortelyou Road on the BMT Brighton Line (now the local Q service). The line was also placed in the cut in response to developer pressure; it was originally at grade level.

Originally Ackerson offered his houses in Beverley Square East for sale at $10,000 and up, and those in Beverley Square West at $6,500 and up; when sales of the first houses in Beverley Square East were disappointing, he had the rest of that neighborhood developed with somewhat simpler houses by Lewis H. Pounds and Delbert H. Decker (it was completed in 1901), and modified his plan for Beverley Square West, building somewhat smaller and less distinctive houses. The Beverley Squares were "Ackerson's major project"; his own home was in Beverley Square West, at 304 Marlborough Street (built in 1903), and Pounds, who later served as Brooklyn Borough President, had his home at 317 East 17th Street in Beverley Square East. Beverley Square West also includes the "honeymoon cottage" built as a wedding present for a daughter of the Guggenheim family, at 305 Rugby Road.

== Gentrification ==
Like the rest of Victorian Flatbush, the Beverley Squares have been revitalized since the 1970s by an influx of new residents who value the relatively cheap houses in a variety of architectural styles with details such as fluted columns, stained glass, large porches, and turrets. Beverley Square West has an active residents' association that celebrated the centenary of the neighborhood in 2002 and had long sought designation by the New York City Landmarks Preservation Commission. On November 25, 2025, the LPC unanimously designated both the Beverley Square West Historic District and the neighboring Ditmas Park West Historic District. The Beverley Square West district encompasses 118 freestanding houses built between 1894 and 1910 in Queen Anne, Colonial Revival, Tudor Revival, and Shingle styles. Together with Ditmas Park West, the Beverley Squares are now often thought of as part of Ditmas Park.

== Education ==
Public School 139, the Alexine Fenty School, occupies the blockfront of Cortelyou Road between Rugby and Argyle Roads in Beverley Square West; several of the original houses were demolished to build an extension to the school. The "mini-school" annex opened in 1989.
