= Ditmas Park, Brooklyn =

Historic district in Brooklyn, New York

- Ditmas Park Historic District
- U.S. National Register of Historic Places
- U.S. Historic district
- New York State Register of Historic Places
- New York City Landmark
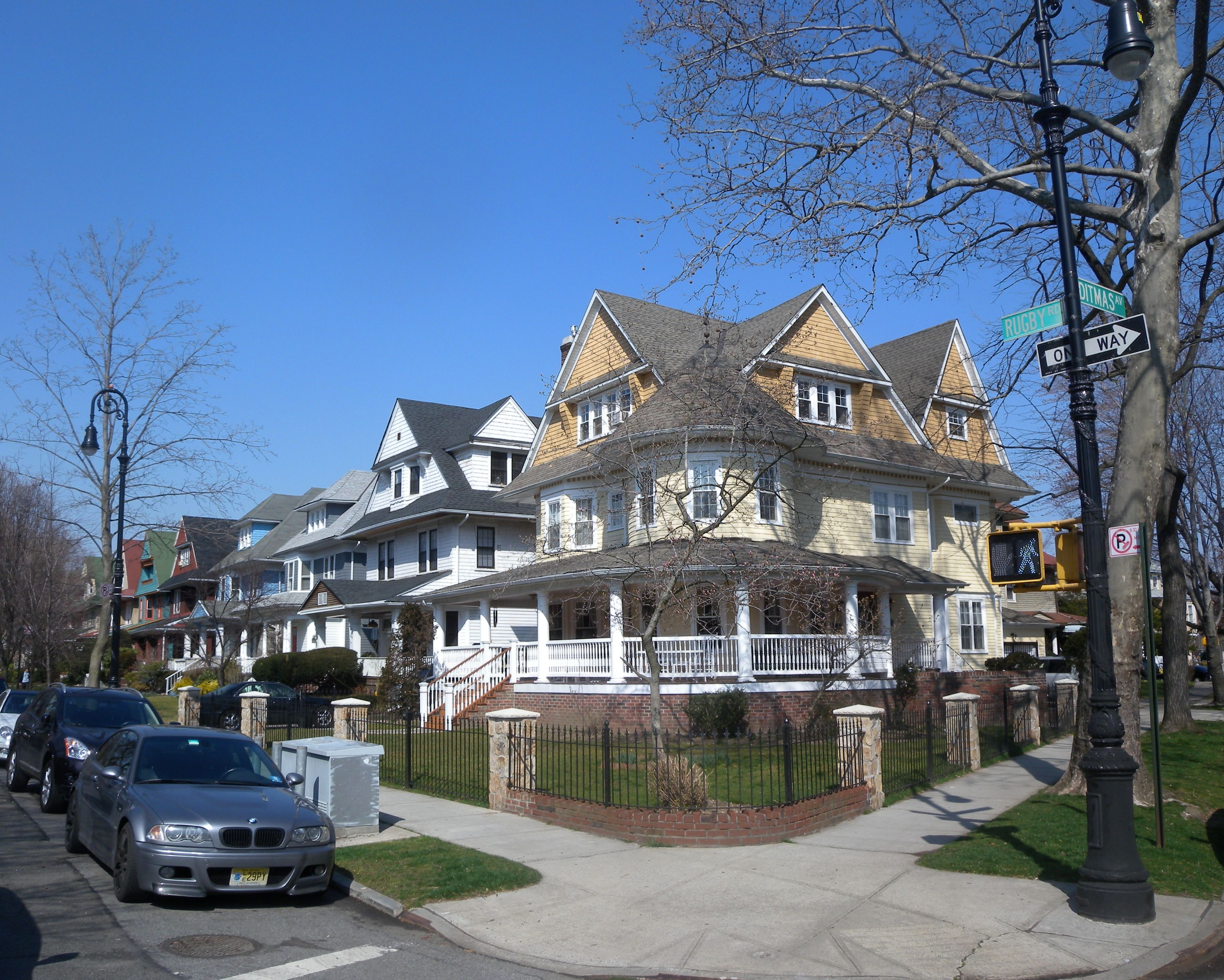
- Ditmas Avenue and Rugby Road

- Location within New York City Location within New York Location within the United States
- Location: Bounded by Marlborough Rd., Dorchester Rd., Ocean Ave., and Newkirk Ave., New York, New York
- Coordinates: 40°38′20″N 73°57′40″W
- Area: 35 acres (14 ha)
- Built: 1902
- Architectural style: Colonial, Queen Anne, Bungalow
- NRHP reference No.: 83001688
- NYCL No.: 1236

Significant dates
- Added to NRHP: September 30, 1983
- Designated NYSRHP: August 13, 1983
- Designated NYCL: July 28, 1981

Ditmas Park is a historic district in the neighborhood of Flatbush in Brooklyn, New York City. The traditional boundaries of Ditmas Park, including Ditmas Park West, are Ocean Avenue and greater Flatbush to the east, Dorchester Road and the Prospect Park South neighborhood to the north, Coney Island Avenue and the Kensington neighborhood to the west, and Newkirk Avenue to the south. The name Ditmas Park is often used as a shorthand for the several neighborhoods that comprise the larger area of Victorian Flatbush.

Ditmas Park is patrolled by the New York City Police Department's 70th Precinct, and is within Brooklyn Community District 14. The New York City Subway's B and Q trains serve Ditmas Park.

The district is located on land formerly owned by the Ditmas family. The area remained rural until the 1890s. At that time, Brooklyn was becoming more popular, due to the development of Prospect Park and the Brooklyn Bridge, along with improved transportation in New York City. Lewis H. Pounds was one of the early developers of the area now known as Ditmas Park Historic District. This eight-block national historic district consists of 2,000 to 2,500 largely residential buildings built between 1902 and 1914. Many of the buildings are large, free-standing, single-family homes with gables and front porches. Most of the building architects were local to the Flatbush or Brooklyn area, and they specialized in suburban buildings. Architectural styles of the area's buildings include Colonial Revival, Bungalow/Craftsman, Queen Anne, Tudor, Greek Revival, and Japanese Cottage. These styles are uncommon in Brooklyn, where brownstones and rowhouses are typical. The district also includes apartment buildings, a commercial district along Cortelyou Road, and one church, the brick Neo-Georgian Flatbush-Tompkins Congregational Church (1910) at which Conrad Tillard is since 2018 the Senior Minister.

== Community ==
Location in New York City

Newkirk Avenue, Coney Island Avenue, Cortelyou Road, Foster Avenue, and Church Avenue are the neighborhood's commercial strips while many of their north–south streets are lined with historic Victorian style homes. Since much of Ditmas Park is residential, many locals go to nearby Park Slope to run errands and shop, although the district has seen increased commercialization due to its recent gentrification.

The Ditmas Park Historic District was listed on the National Register of Historic Places in 1983. Throughout the 1980s and early 1990s, wealthy families purchased the large Victorian homes, but in the past few years, the district has experienced rapid gentrification, with an influx of young people and artists attracted to the large spaces for relatively cheap rents. An example of this is Cortelyou Road, a commercial street in the neighborhood. Cortelyou enjoys a number of delis, bars, coffee shops, restaurants, the Flatbush Food Co-op, and more upscale restaurants. Cortelyou is also home to many venues, which attracts many local musicians, as well as more well-known artists.

In October 2009, Time Out New York named Ditmas Park one of the best neighborhoods in New York City for food. Similar articles praising Ditmas Park for its food have appeared in The New York Times and AM New York.

The area is also frequently used for movie and TV filming due to its Victorian houses, which project a suburban feel.

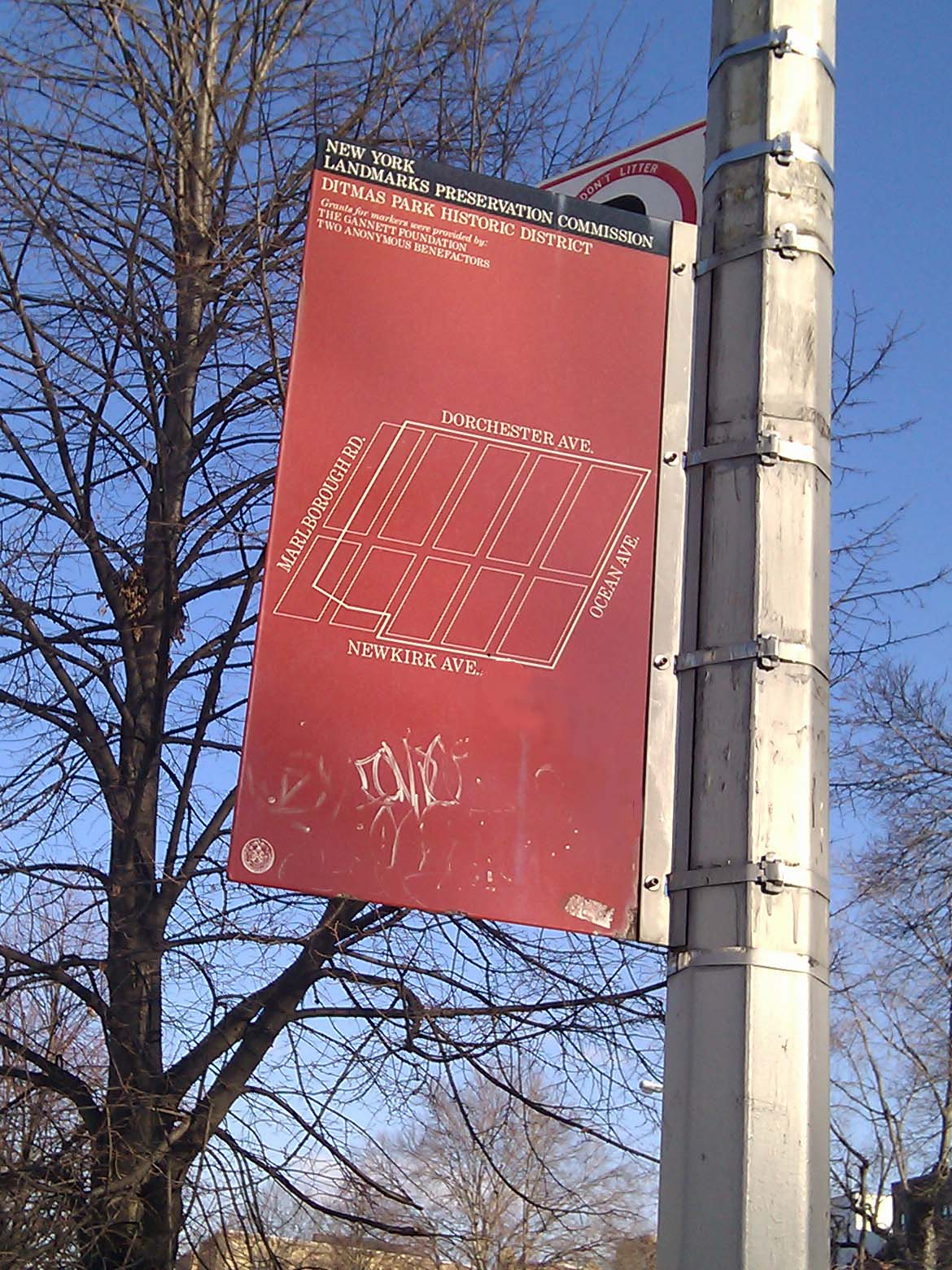
Sign of Ditmas Park Historic District map

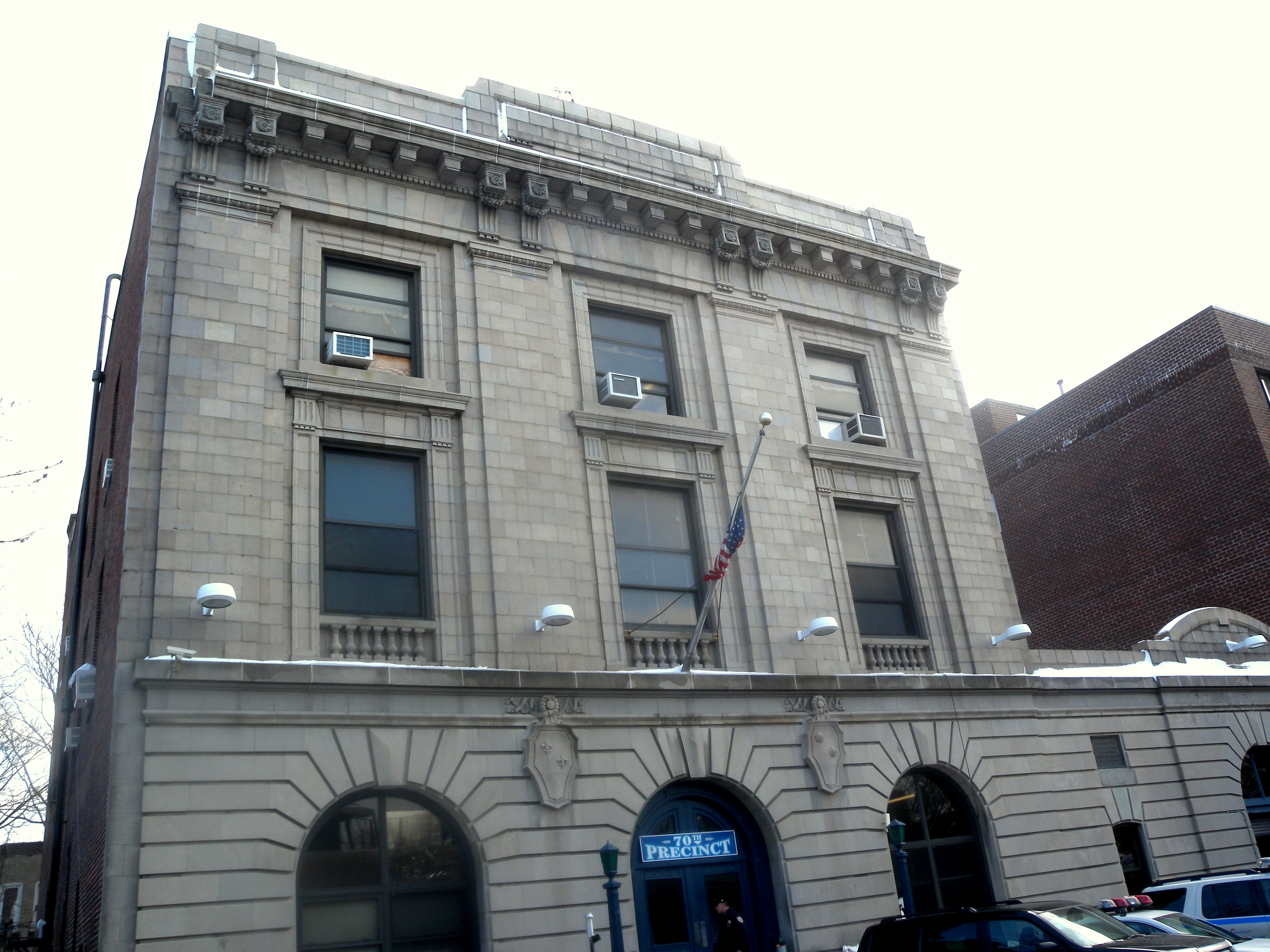
70th Precinct, NYPD

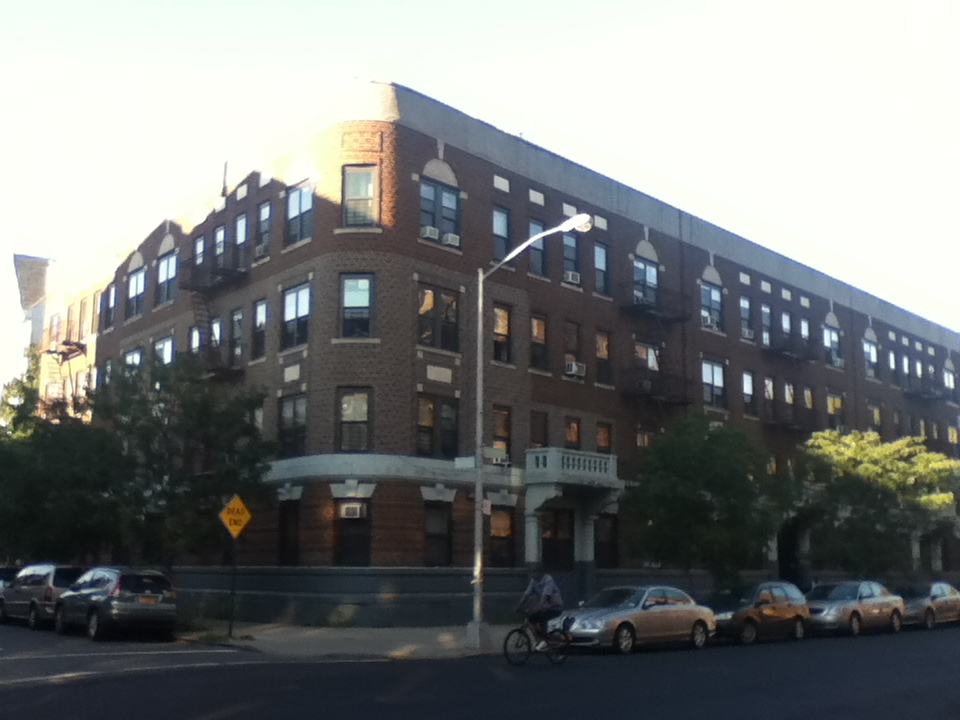
A street in Ditmas Park

== Associations ==
The Ditmas Park Association, founded in 1908, hosts social events, publishes a newsletter and a home improvement directory, and works on numerous civic issues, often jointly with its sister neighborhoods and the Flatbush Development Corporation. The Flatbush Development Corporation hosts an annual Victorian Flatbush House Tour.

Other neighborhood associations also serve parts of the area, such as the Ditmas Park West Neighborhood Association (DPW), and Beverley Square West Neighborhood Association. DPW runs a Yahoo group for the neighborhood. Flatbush Artists is also based in the area and has an annual artwalk featuring artists who live in the area.

Beginning in March 2012, the website Ditmas Park Corner documented important events and openings in the area, and served as a forum for discussions and inquiries about the neighborhood; as of 2017 the site was incorporated into the Brooklyn-wide news site Bklyner. For a brief period of time in the early 2010s, Ditmas Park Corner had competition from Ditmas Park Patch, one of a series of neighborhood news organizations run by AOL.

== Library ==
The Brooklyn Public Library's Cortelyou branch is located at 1305 Cortelyou Road, near Argyle Road. The branch was first proposed in 1969, but did not open until 1983.

== Transportation ==
New York City Subway stops in or very near to Ditmas Park are Beverley Road (Q train), Cortelyou Road (Q train), Newkirk Plaza (B and Q trains), and Avenue H (Q train). MTA-operated express buses that run through Ditmas Park are the BM1, BM2, BM3 and BM4, and local buses are the B8, B68 and B103.

== Notable residents ==
- Aaron Dessner (born 1976), of The National
- Bryce Dessner (born 1976), composer and guitarist
- Jack Houghteling, novelist
- Ric Menello (1952-2013), screenwriter and director, co-directed the Beastie Boys' music videos "(You Gotta) Fight for Your Right (To Party!)" and "No Sleep till Brooklyn".
- Roy Nathanson (born 1951), saxophonist, composer, bandleader who became the leader and principal composer of the Jazz Passengers
- Tim O'Brien (born 1964), illustrator
- Ben Smith, former editor-in-chief of BuzzFeed
- Sonja Sohn (born 1964), actress
- Sufjan Stevens (born 1975), singer-songwriter
- Michelle Williams (born 1980), actress

Kenny Barron (jazz musician) Bill Frissell (jazz guitarist) Steven Alan (menswear designer and retailer)
