= T. B. Ackerson Company =

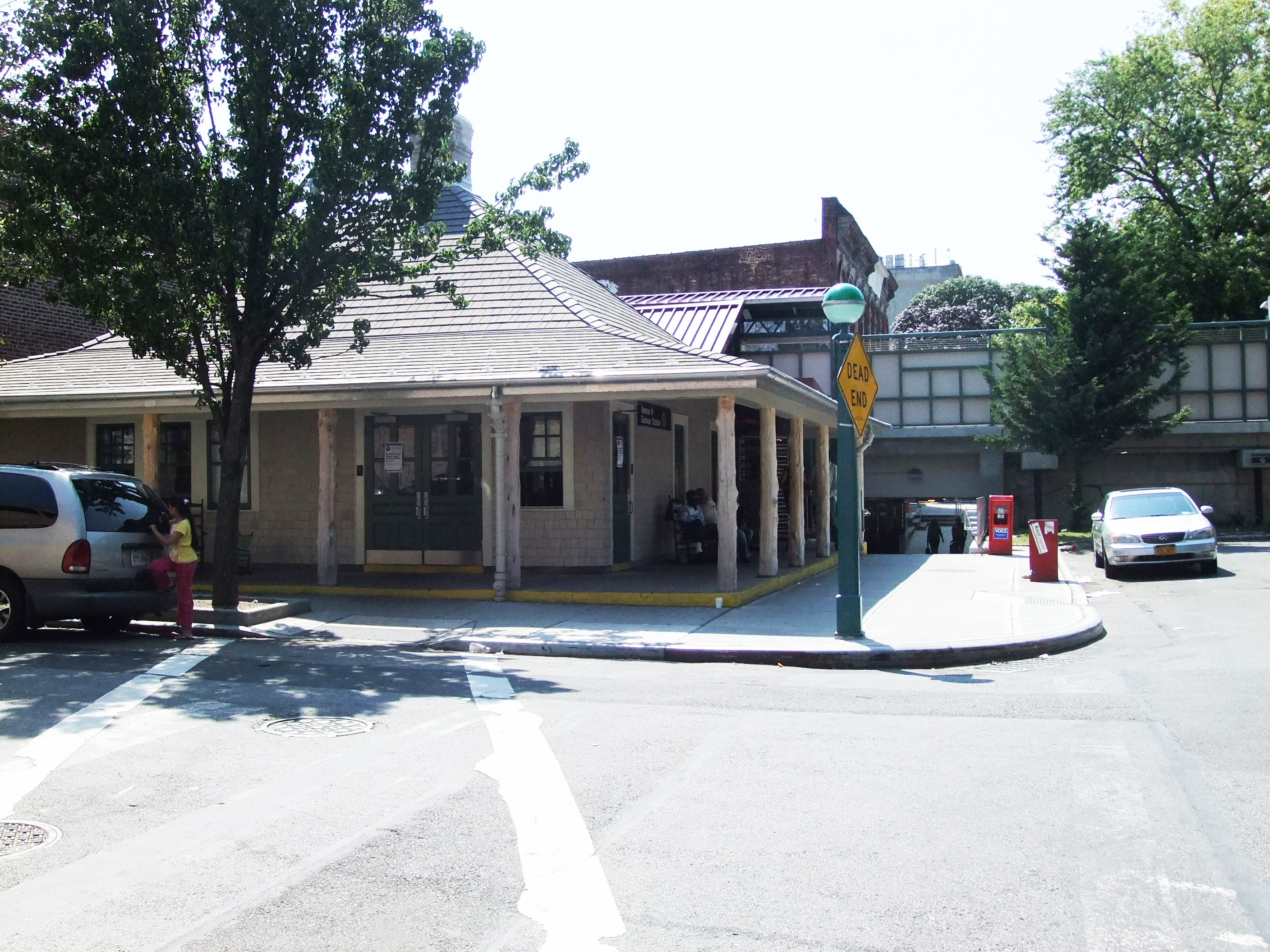
- The company's former sales office in Fiske Terrace, Brooklyn, now part of the Avenue H New York City Subway station
- Industry: Real estate
- Founded: 1898
- Founder: Thomas Benton Ackerson

The T.B. Ackerson Company was a real estate development company that built several planned communities in the New York metropolitan area during the late 19th and early 20th centuries.

== History ==
The company was founded by Thomas Benton Ackerson in 1898. That year, it purchased and began developing land in Flatbush bounded between East 19th Street, Ocean Avenue, Beverly Road and Cortelyou Road. The development, known as Beverly Square East, was completed and fully sold by 1901.

In the 1920s, the company developed a neighborhood over a portion of shipping tycoon Carlos W. Munson's estate in Flower Hill, New York.

Its former real estate office building for Fiske Terrace is now a station house for the New York City Subway's Avenue H station, at the corner of Avenue H and East 16th Street. The building was designated a landmark by the New York City Landmarks Preservation Commission in 2005.

== Notable developments ==
- Beverley Squares (in Brooklyn)
- West Midwood (in Brooklyn)
- Fiske Terrace (in Brooklyn)
- Portions of Flower Hill, New York (on Long Island)
- Brightwaters, New York (on Long Island; now an incorporated village of the same name)

== See also ==
- Dean Alvord
- Levitt & Sons
