= Brightwaters, New York =

- Village
- Incorporated Village of Brightwaters
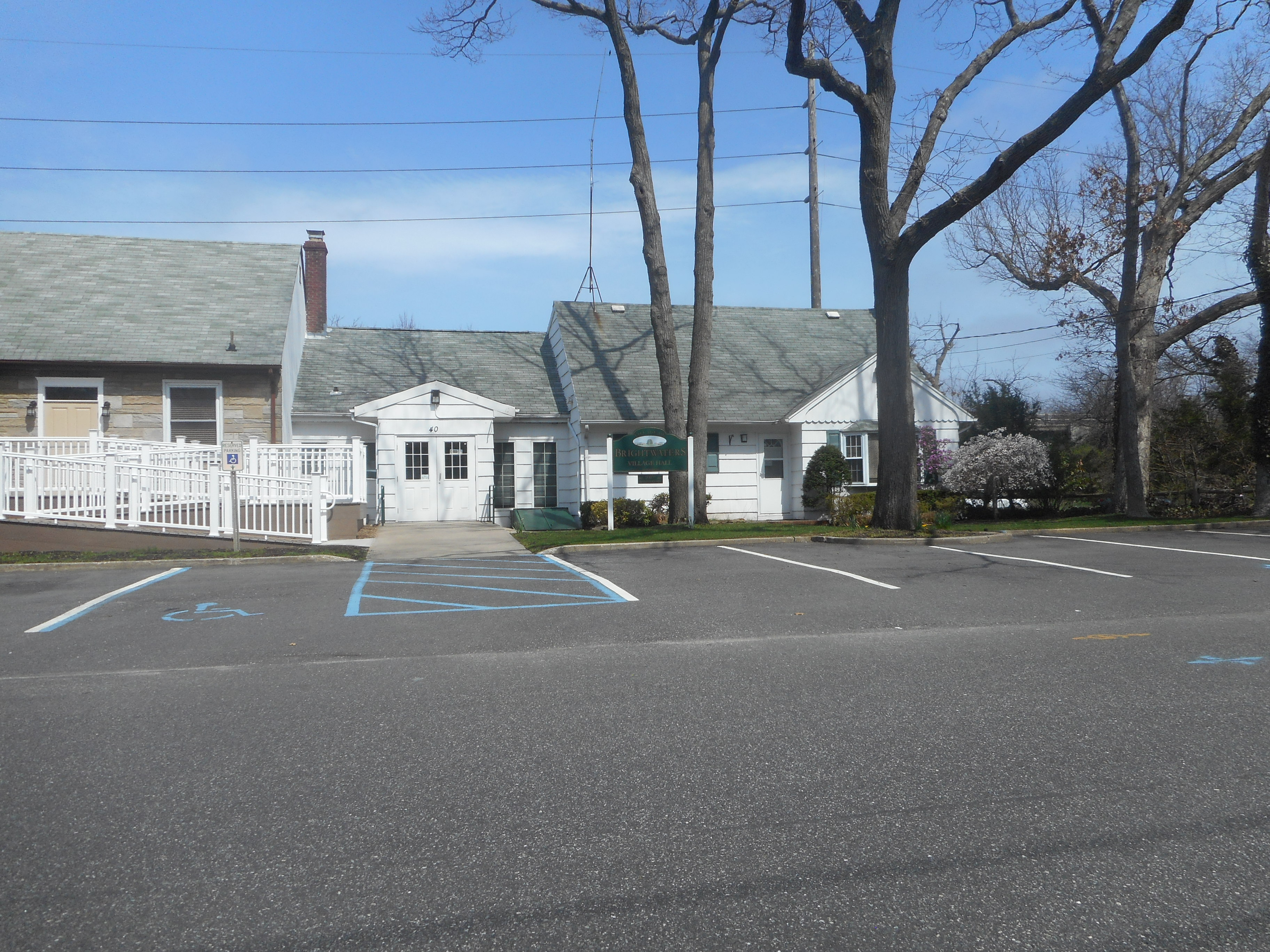
- Brightwaters Village Hall in 2019

- Location within Suffolk County.

- Location on Long Island Location within the state of New York
- Coordinates: 40°43′17″N 73°15′57″W
- Country: United States
- State: New York
- County: Suffolk
- Town: Islip
- Incorporated: November 30, 1916

Area
  - Total: 0.99 sq mi (2.56 km^{2})
  - Land: 0.97 sq mi (2.50 km^{2})
  - Water: 0.023 sq mi (0.06 km^{2})
- Elevation: 23 ft (7 m)

Population (2020)
  - Total: 3,181
  - Density: 3,294.3/sq mi (1,271.92/km^{2})
- Time zone: UTC-5 (Eastern (EST))
  - Summer (DST): UTC-4 (EDT)
- ZIP code: 11718
- Area codes: 631, 934
- FIPS code: 36-08323
- GNIS feature ID: 0975774
- Website: www.villageofbrightwaters.com

Brightwaters is an incorporated village located within the southwestern part of the Town of Islip in Suffolk County, on Long Island, in New York, United States. The population was 3,181 at the time of the 2020 census.

== History ==
Brightwaters was developed in the early 20th Century by the T.B. Ackerson Company, which was known for its work in Brooklyn.

By 1916, locals felt that their community – which, at the time, was still an unincorporated part of the Town of Islip – would be better off if they were to incorporate it as a village, citing concerns over how their community was being taxed, and how they had to pay for private subscriptions for services which they believed should have been provided to the area by Islip through their taxes. This prompted the locals to sign a petition to incorporate Brightwaters as a village. The petition was given to the Town of Islip on September 20, 1916, and Brightwaters officially became an incorporated village on November 30 of that year.

== Geography ==
According to the United States Census Bureau, the village has a total area of 1.0 square mile (2.6 km^{2}), of which 0.97 square miles (2.5 km^{2}) is land and 0.04 square miles (0.1 km^{2}), or 2.26%, is water.

It contains Wohseepee Park in northern Brightwaters, the Brightwaters Canal directly south of Montauk Highway, and four lakes directly north of Montauk Highway: Cascades Lake, Mirror Lake, Lagoon Lake and Nosrekca Lake. The village's businesses are located at the intersection of Windsor Avenue and Orinoco Drive (referred to as Brightwaters Village). These geographic features make up the three districts of the village; the Canal District (southern Brightwaters, everything south of Montauk Highway), the Lakes District (central Brightwaters, everything north of the highway to Union Boulevard) and the Wohseepee Park District (northern Brightwaters, everything north of Union Boulevard to Seneca Drive).

Brightwaters uses the 11718 ZIP code, which is distinct from the Bay Shore Postal District (11706).

== Demographics ==
Historical population
Census	Pop.	Note	%±
1920	250		—
1930	1,061		324.4%
1940	1,562		47.2%
1950	2,336		49.6%
1960	3,193		36.7%
1970	3,808		19.3%
1980	3,286		−13.7%
1990	3,265		−0.6%
2000	3,248		−0.5%
2010	3,103		−4.5%
2020	3,181		2.5%
U.S. Decennial Census

=== 2020 census ===
As of the 2020 census, Brightwaters had a population of 3,181. The median age was 43.4 years. 22.9% of residents were under the age of 18 and 17.7% of residents were 65 years of age or older. For every 100 females there were 99.6 males, and for every 100 females age 18 and over there were 98.1 males age 18 and over.

100.0% of residents lived in urban areas, while 0.0% lived in rural areas.

There were 1,135 households in Brightwaters, of which 37.2% had children under the age of 18 living in them. Of all households, 65.7% were married-couple households, 11.8% were households with a male householder and no spouse or partner present, and 18.7% were households with a female householder and no spouse or partner present. About 15.8% of all households were made up of individuals and 8.5% had someone living alone who was 65 years of age or older.

There were 1,160 housing units, of which 2.2% were vacant. The homeowner vacancy rate was 0.8% and the rental vacancy rate was 7.4%.

Racial composition as of the 2020 census
Race	Number	Percent
White	2,781	87.4%
Black or African American	84	2.6%
American Indian and Alaska Native	1	0.0%
Asian	49	1.5%
Native Hawaiian and Other Pacific Islander	0	0.0%
Some other race	47	1.5%
Two or more races	219	6.9%
Hispanic or Latino (of any race)	250	7.9%

=== 2010 census ===
As of the census of 2010, there were 3,103 people residing in the village. The racial makeup of the village was 94.26% White, 1.51% African American, 1.61% Asian, 0.03% Native American, 0.87% from other races, and 1.71% from two or more races. Hispanic or Latino of any race composed 5.12% of the population.

=== 2000 census ===
As of the census of 2000, there were 3,248 people, 1,127 households, and 912 families residing in the village. The population density was 3,299.2 inhabitants per square mile (1,273.8/km^{2}). There were 1,144 housing units at an average density of 1,162.0 per square mile (448.7/km^{2}). The racial makeup of the village was 95.23% White, 1.57% African American, 0.06% Native American, 1.29% Asian, 0.06% Pacific Islander, 0.65% from other races, and 1.14% from two or more races. Hispanic or Latino of any race were 4.06% of the population.

Out of the 1,127 households, 38.9% had children under the age of 18 living with them, 71.8% were married couples living together, 6.8% had a female householder with no husband present, and 19.0% were non-families. 14.6% of all households were made up of individuals, and 5.9% had someone living alone who was 65 years of age or older. The average household size was 2.87 and the average family size was 3.20.

In the village, the population was spread out, with 27.3% under the age of 18, 5.0% from 18 to 24, 28.8% from 25 to 44, 27.2% from 45 to 64, and 11.7% who were 65 years of age or older. The median age was 38 years. For every 100 females, there were 93.7 males. For every 100 females age 18 and over, there were 94.7 males.

The median income for a household in the village in 2016 was $146,892, and the median income for a family was $121,569. About 0.8% of families and 1.8% of the population were below the poverty line, including 0.7% of those under age 18 and none of those age 65 or over.

== Parks and recreation ==
Parks in Brightwaters include:

- Gilbert Park
- Walker Beach
- Wohseepee Park

== Government ==
As of July 2021, the Mayor of Brightwaters is John J. Valdini, and the Village Trustees are Mary Del Vecchio, Michael Dopsovic, Patrick Fawcett, and Thomas Zepf.

In the 2020 U.S. presidential election, the majority of Brightwaters voters voted for Donald Trump (R).

== Education ==
=== School district ===
Brightwaters is located entirely within the boundaries of – and is thus served by – the Bay Shore Union Free School District. Accordingly, all children who reside within Brightwaters and attend public schools go to Bay Shore's schools.

=== Library district ===
Brightwaters is located wholly within the boundaries of the Bay Shore–Brightwaters Public Library District.

== Notable person ==
- Rick Lazio – Congressman, 2000 Senatorial candidate, and former gubernatorial candidate (R).

== See also ==
- List of villages in New York (state)
- Fiske Terrace, Brooklyn – Another neighborhood developed by the T. B. Ackerson Company.
