= Brooklyn Community Board 14 =

Brooklyn Community District 14
- Community District
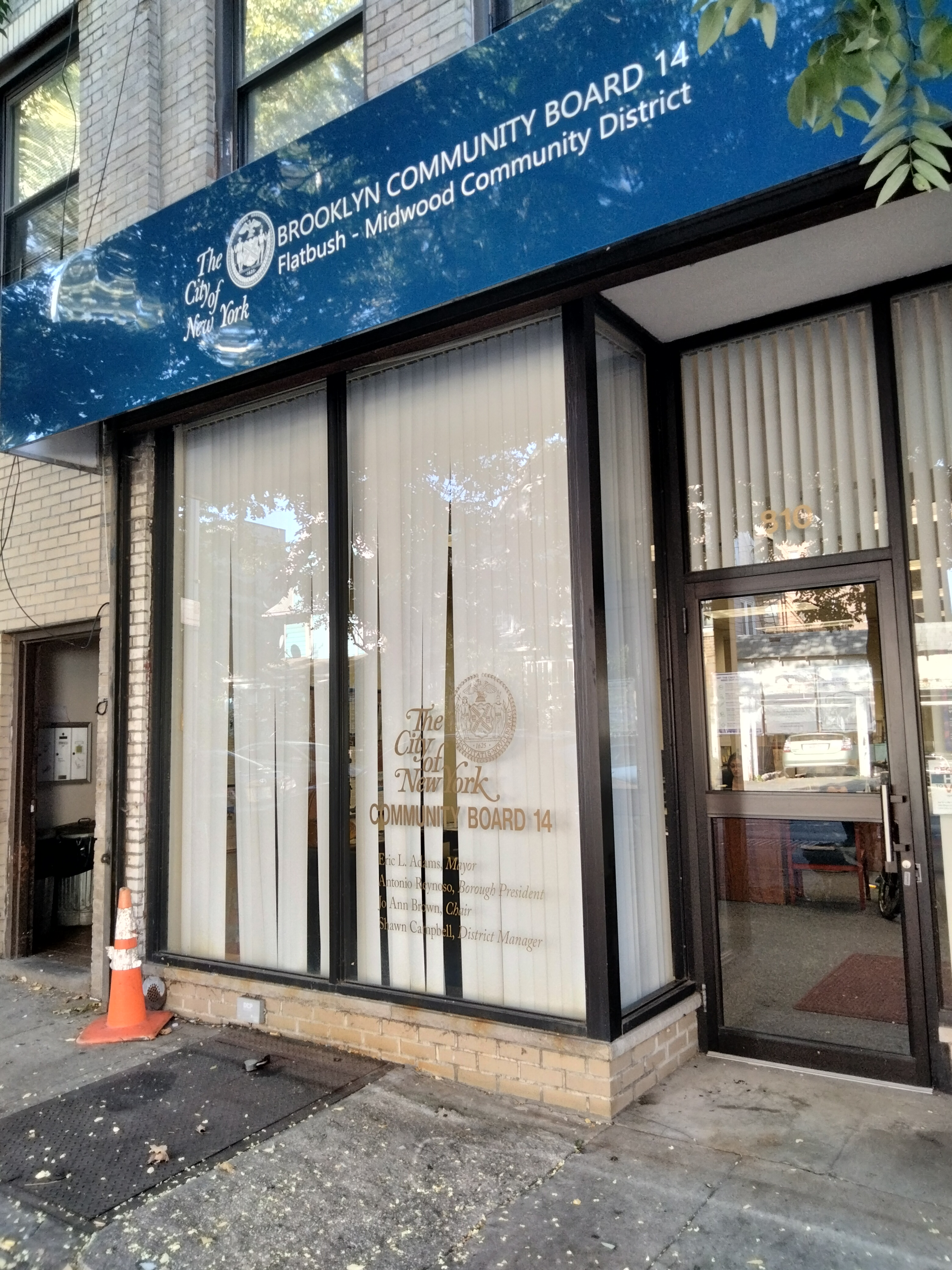
- Entrance to Community Board offices
- Country: United States
- State: New York
- City: New York City
- Borough: Brooklyn
- Neighborhoods: List: Ditmas Park; Flatbush; parts of Kensington; Midwood; Ocean Parkway; Prospect Park South

Government
  - Chairperson: Karl-Henry Cesar
  - District Manager: Shawn Campbell

Area
  - Total: 2.9 sq mi (7.5 km^{2})

Population (2010)
  - Total: 160,664
  - Density: 55,000/sq mi (21,000/km^{2})

Ethnicity
  - White: 40.3%
  - African-American: 30.7%
  - Hispanic and Latino (of any race): 15.7%
  - Asian: 10.7%
  - Others: 2.7%
- Time zone: UTC−5 (Eastern)
  - Summer (DST): UTC−4 (EDT)
- ZIP Codes: 11210, 11218, 11226, and 11230
- Area codes: 718, 347, 929, and 917
- Police Precincts: 70th (website)
- Website: www.cb14brooklyn.com

Brooklyn Community Board 14 is a New York City community board that encompasses the Brooklyn neighborhoods of Flatbush, Midwood, Kensington, and Ocean Parkway. It is delimited by Coney Island Avenue, the Long Island Rail Road, McDonald Avenue, Avenue F and 18th Avenue on the west, Parkside Avenue on the north, Bedford Avenue, Foster Avenue and Nostrand Avenue on the east, and Kings Highway and Avenue P on the south.

Its current chairperson is Karl-Henry Cesar, and its district manager is Shawn Campbell.

As of the United States Census, 2000, the Community Board has a population of 168,806, up from 159,825 in 1990 and 143,859 in 1980. Of them (as of 2000), 60,268 (35.7%) are White non Hispanic, 66,211 (39.2%) are African-American, 13,155 (7.8%) Asian or Pacific Islander, 268 (0.2%) American Indian or Native Alaskan, 893 (0.5%) of some other race, 5,769 (3.4%) of two or more race, 22,242 (13.2%) of Hispanic origins. 36.8% of the population benefit from public assistance as of 2004, up from 21.6% in 2000.

The land area is 1,880.1 acres (7.608 km^{2}).

== Demographics ==
The entirety of Community Board 14, which comprises Flatbush and Midwood, had 165,543 inhabitants as of NYC Health's 2018 Community Health Profile, with an average life expectancy of 82.4 years. This is slightly higher than the median life expectancy of 81.2 for all New York City neighborhoods. Most inhabitants are middle-aged adults and youth: 25% are between the ages of 0–17, 29% between 25–44, and 24% between 45–64. The ratio of college-aged and elderly residents was lower, at 9% and 13% respectively.

As of 2016, the median household income in Community Board 14 was $56,599. In 2018, an estimated 22% of Flatbush and Midwood residents lived in poverty, compared to 21% in all of Brooklyn and 20% in all of New York City. One in eleven residents (9%) were unemployed, compared to 9% in the rest of both Brooklyn and New York City. Rent burden, or the percentage of residents who have difficulty paying their rent, is 57% in Flatbush and Midwood, higher than the citywide and boroughwide rates of 52% and 51% respectively.

== Health ==
As of 2018, preterm births are more common in Flatbush and Midwood than in other places citywide, though births to teenage mothers are less common. In Flatbush and Midwood, there were 99 preterm births per 1,000 live births (compared to 87 per 1,000 citywide), and 17.1 births to teenage mothers per 1,000 live births (compared to 19.3 per 1,000 citywide). Flatbush and Midwood has a relatively high population of residents who are uninsured, or who receive healthcare through Medicaid. In 2018, this population of uninsured residents was estimated to be 16%, which is higher than the citywide rate of 12%.

The concentration of fine particulate matter, the deadliest type of air pollutant, in Flatbush and Midwood is 0.0077 milligrams per cubic metre (7.7×10^{−9} oz/ft^{3}), lower than the citywide and boroughwide averages. Ten percent of Flatbush and Midwood residents are smokers, which is slightly lower than the city average of 14% of residents being smokers. In Flatbush and Midwood, 28% of residents are obese, 13% are diabetic, and 31% have high blood pressure—compared to the citywide averages of 24%, 11%, and 28% respectively. In addition, 21% of children are obese, compared to the citywide average of 20%.

Eighty percent of residents eat some fruits and vegetables every day, which is lower than the city's average of 87%. In 2018, 77% of residents described their health as "good", "very good", or "excellent", slightly less than the city's average of 78%. For every supermarket in Flatbush and Midwood, there are 21 bodegas.

Major hospitals in close proximity to Flatbush include Kings County Hospital and SUNY Downstate Medical Center. The facilities are located in neighboring East Flatbush just east of New York Avenue.

== Education ==
Flatbush and Midwood generally has a similar ratio of college-educated residents to the rest of the city as of 2018. Though 43% of residents age 25 and older have a college education or higher, 18% have less than a high school education and 39% are high school graduates or have some college education. By contrast, 40% of Brooklynites and 38% of city residents have a college education or higher. The percentage of Flatbush and Midwood students excelling in math rose from 43 percent in 2000 to 68 percent in 2011, though reading achievement remained steady at 48% during the same time period.

Flatbush and Midwood's rate of elementary school student absenteeism is about equal to the rest of New York City. In Flatbush and Midwood, 18% of elementary school students missed twenty or more days per school year, compared to the citywide average of 20% of students. Additionally, 75% of high school students in Flatbush and Midwood graduate on time, equal to the citywide average of 75% of students.
