= Bklyner =

Brooklyn-based local free online newspaper

- Website type: News website
- Available in: English
- Founded: 2017; 9 years ago
- Dissolved: 2021; 5 years ago
- Headquarters: Brooklyn, New York, United States
- Website: bklyner.com

Bklyner (pronounced "Brooklyner", often stylized in all-caps) was a hyper-local news site from the borough of Brooklyn in New York City.

It has been described as "telling the stories considered too small for the major newspapers to bother with." Exclusives such as a 27,000 gallon oil spill "that the authorities had not made public" led to legal changes.

Major New York City newspapers such the New York Daily News and the New York Post cite their information as a source.

== History ==
The site began in 2017 when several hyper-local sites merged into one. The publication mostly publishes material online, but has also published printed newspapers.

A neighborhood news website named Ditmas Park Corner, after five years on its own, was folded into Bklyner. Prior to merging into Bklyner, Ditmas Park Corner funded paying a reporter to walk around the neighborhood.

On 26 August 2021, editor Liena Zagare announced that Bklyner would cease publication on 10 September 2021 after over 50,000 articles, citing financial sustainability issues and a burnout caused in particular by the two years prior.

== Funding ==
Bklyner, although it carries ads, in 2017 "cut its staff from six full-time reporters to two-and-a-half, primarily because ad revenue had fallen" and also sought "paying subscribers, even though the site remains free." As of early 2020, ads and subscribers was still the support model for free access.
