= Newkirk Plaza station =

New York City Subway station in Brooklyn

Newkirk Plaza
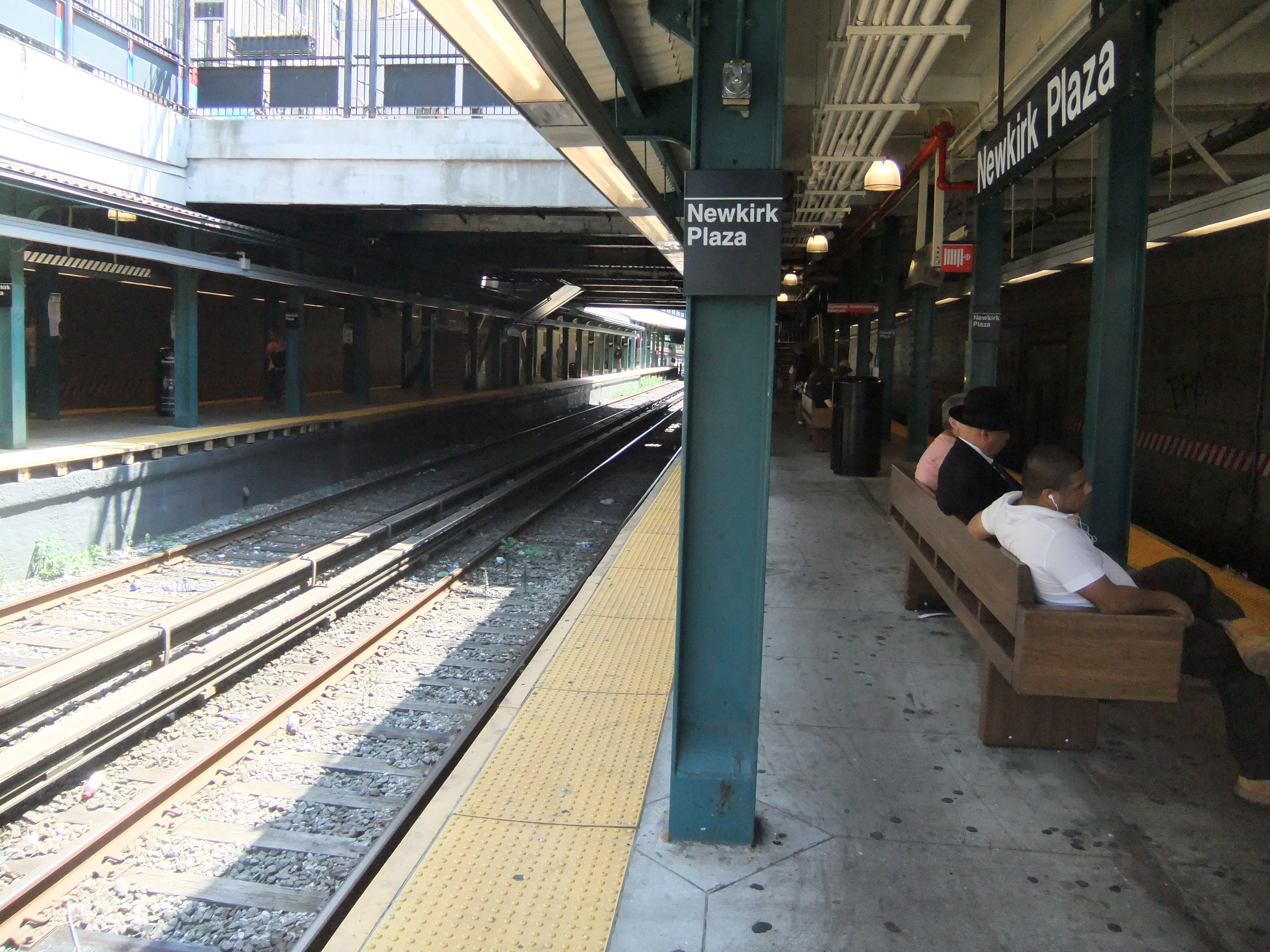

Station statistics
- Address: Newkirk Avenue & East 16th Street; Brooklyn, New York
- Borough: Brooklyn
- Locale: Ditmas Park, Flatbush
- Coordinates: 40.6357°N 73.963°W
- Division: B (BMT)
- Line: BMT Brighton Line
- Services: B (weekday rush hours, middays and early evenings); Q (all times)
- Transit: NYCT Bus: B8
- Structure: Open-cut
- Platforms: 2 island platforms cross-platform interchange
- Tracks: 4

Other information
- Opened: original station: July 2, 1878; 148 years ago
- Rebuilt: current station: August 23, 1907; 119 years ago
- Former/other names: Parkville (1878-????); South Midwood (????-1908); Newkirk Avenue (1908-2011)

Traffic
- 2025: 2,234,237 ▲4%
- Rank: 162 out of 423
Services
Preceding station	New York City Subway	Following station
Church Avenue B toward 145th Street	Express	Kings Highway B toward Brighton Beach
Cortelyou Road Q toward 96th Street	Local	Avenue H Q toward Coney Island–Stillwell Avenue
Location
Location within New York City Subway
Location within New York City
Location within New York
Track layout
Street map
Station service legend
Symbol	Description
Stops all times	Stops all times
Stops weekdays during the day	Stops weekdays during the day

The Newkirk Plaza station is an express station on the BMT Brighton Line of the New York City Subway in Flatbush, Brooklyn. It is located on an open-cut at the center of the pedestrian-only Newkirk Plaza shopping mall, which is bounded by Newkirk Avenue on the north, Foster Avenue on the south, Marlborough Road to the west, and East 16th Street to the east. The station is served by the Q train at all times and by the B train on weekdays only.

== History ==
The station opened around 1900 as a two-track surface station named South Midwood, a reference to its location at the southern end of the former Town of Flatbush, which was also historically known as Midwood. Currently, Midwood is considered to be the area south of where the station now stands, so it would now more correctly be described as being in South Flatbush or North Midwood. The station was located along the Brooklyn, Flatbush and Coney Island Railroad line to Brighton Beach, which was built in 1878.

In 1903, a reconstruction project began to remove grade crossings along the line as part of the "Brighton Beach Improvement," which also rebuilt stations of the Brighton Beach Line and electrified the line due to increased ridership on the line. When on the surface, the station was a division point at which short turned elevated trains of the Fulton Street El terminated. After grade crossings on the line were eliminated in 1908, the station became a through stop for all services; at this time it was given the name Newkirk Avenue. On the eastern side of the station entrance building there is a plaque, which reads: "The Depression and Elevation of this railroad to abolish grade crossings was authorized by the Legislature May 9th, 1903. A joint undertaking between the City Of New York and the Brooklyn Heights R.R. Co. under the direction of the Brooklyn Grade Crossing Commission. ..... Work commenced August 1st 1904 - Completed July 1st 1908." This plaque refers to the aforementioned grade crossing project.

On August 1, 1920, a tunnel under Flatbush Avenue opened, connecting the Brighton Line to the Broadway subway in Manhattan. At the same time, the line's former track connections to the Fulton Street Elevated were severed. Subway trains from Manhattan and elevated trains from Franklin Avenue served Brighton Line stations, sharing the line to Coney Island.

During the 1964–1965 fiscal year, the platforms at Newkirk Avenue, along with those at six other stations on the Brighton Line, were lengthened to 615 feet (187 m) to accommodate a ten-car train of 60 foot (18 m)-long cars, or a nine-car train of 67 foot (20 m)-long cars.

In 1981, the Metropolitan Transportation Authority listed the station among the 69 most deteriorated stations in the subway system. Starting in the late 1980s or early 1990s, business owners in the adjoining shopping area began advocating for the station to be renamed after the mall. The station and mall underwent reconstruction from 2009 to 2011. This included installation of yellow warning strips on the platform edges and repainting of the columns from red to green. The renovation cost $30 million. As part of the renovation of the station, it was renamed Newkirk Plaza in August 2011.

By 2026, the bridges carrying Foster and Newkirk Avenues over the station were severely corroded, and the New York City Department of Transportation was soliciting proposals for their replacement. That October, the MTA announced plans to install taller fare gates with glass panels at 20 additional stations, including the Newkirk Plaza station, following a successful pilot program at earlier stations.

== Station layout ==
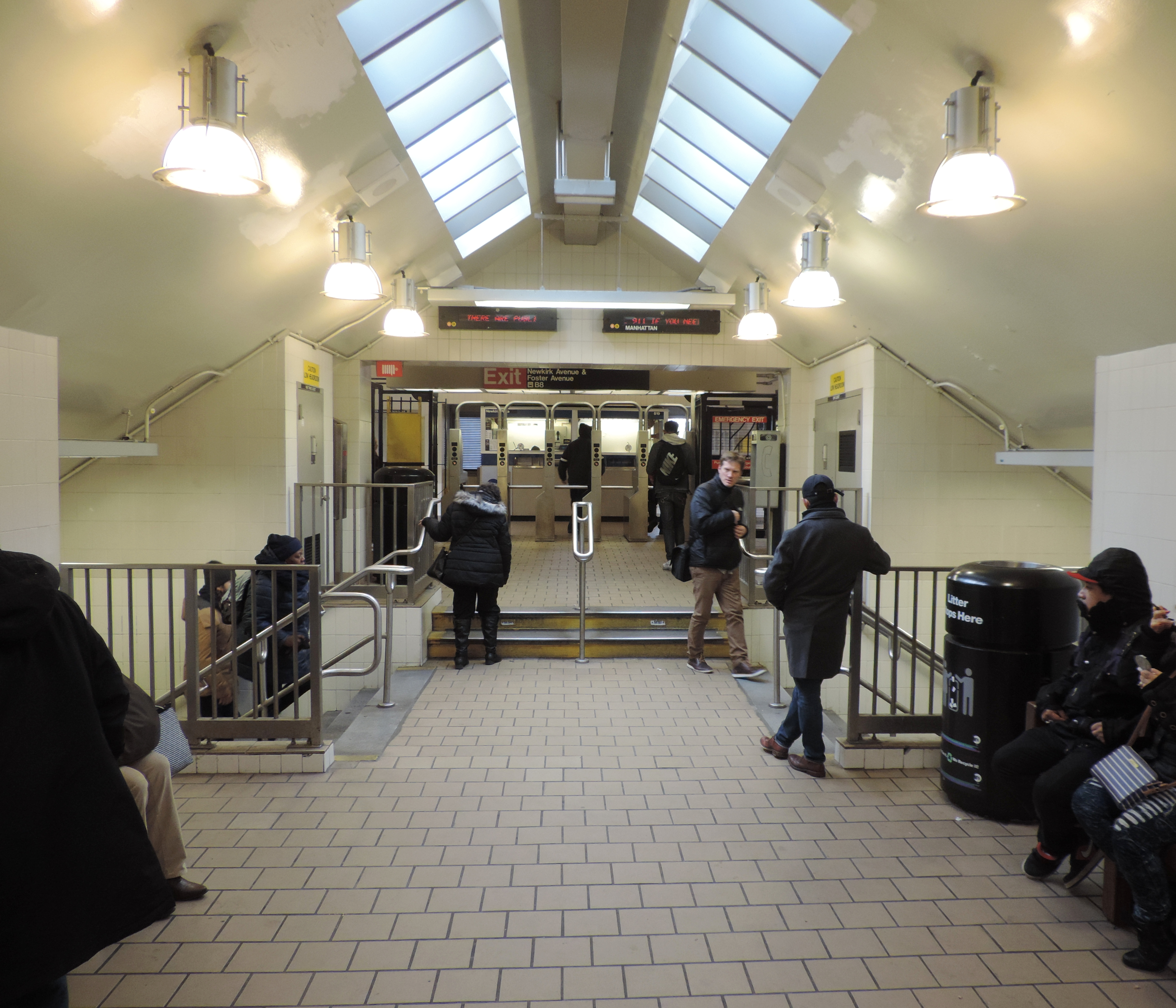
Waiting room and turnstiles

This open-cut station has four tracks and two island platforms, typical for a New York City Subway express station. Two pairs of I-beam columns run along the lengths of both platforms. The Q stops here at all times and is local, while the B stops here only on weekdays during the day and is express. The next stop to the north is Cortelyou Road for local trains and Church Avenue for express trains, while the next stop to the south is Avenue H for local trains and Kings Highway for express trains.

=== Newkirk Plaza mall ===
Directly above the station is the Newkirk Plaza shopping area, which is located on either side of a pedestrian walkway above the station. The mall opened in 1913, shortly after the current station did. The shopping area is of an open-air format and all the stores face a passageway that is owned and maintained by the New York City Department of Transportation; however, the stores are privately owned. Many of the stores there are small family-owned businesses, lending the area a "small-town feel." Since the late 2000s, there have been efforts to create a business improvement district for the shopping area.

The Manhattan-bound local track is completely underneath the east side of the mall while the Coney Island-bound one is underneath the west side of the mall except for a section at the north end. The express tracks are in open view except in the center (where the station's only entrance is) and at either ends (where the Newkirk and Foster Avenues overpasses are).

=== Exit ===
The station's only entrance and exit is a station house at the center of the plaza. It has a token booth, turnstile bank, and a staircase leading to a short landing above both platforms that separate into two staircases facing the opposite directions going down to the platforms themselves. The station house was renovated in 1988, which included installation of white tiles and a stained-glass artwork titled Transit Skylight by David Wilson. The station house is located on Newkirk Avenue's south side between East 15th and East 16th Streets.

== In popular culture ==
This station appeared in the Futurama episode "The Luck of the Fryrish" and was portrayed as being in Fry's old neighborhood of Ditmas Park, considering his old home is a detached albeit run-down Victorian house. It also appeared in the films Next Stop, Greenwich Village, and Man Push Cart.

== Gallery ==
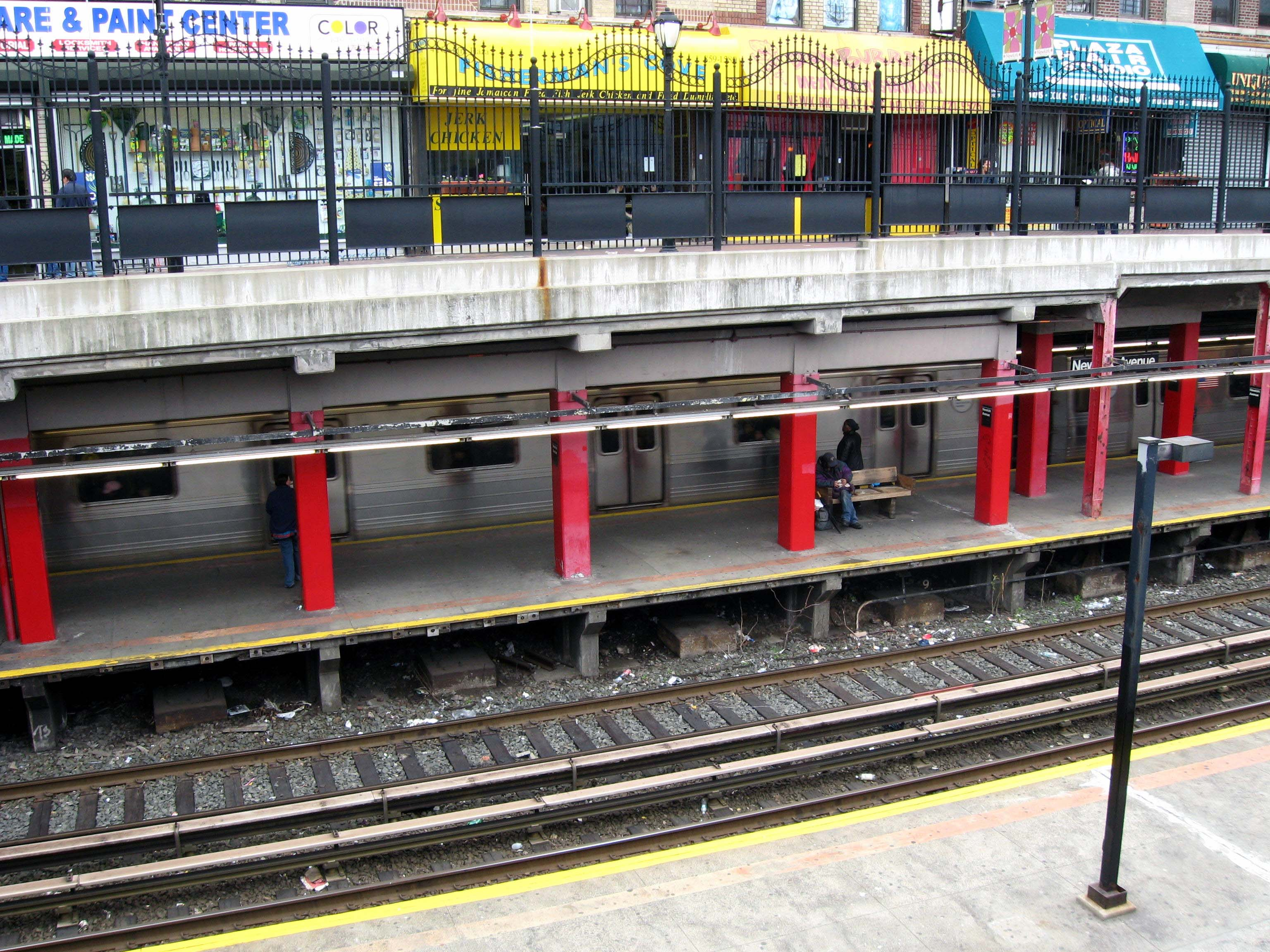
Newkirk Plaza and station before renovation and the renaming

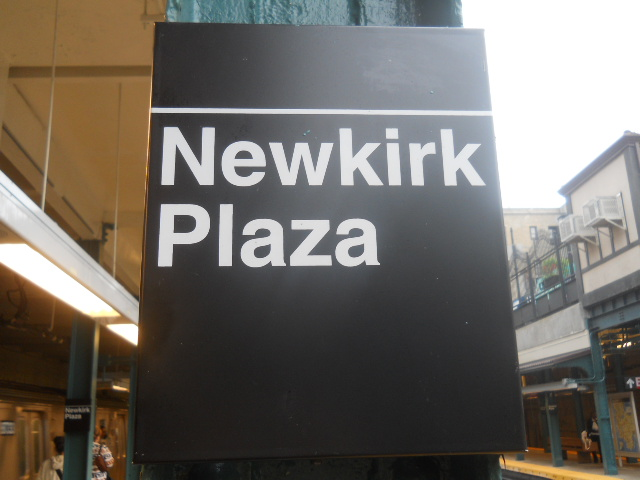
New sign and green columns after renovation

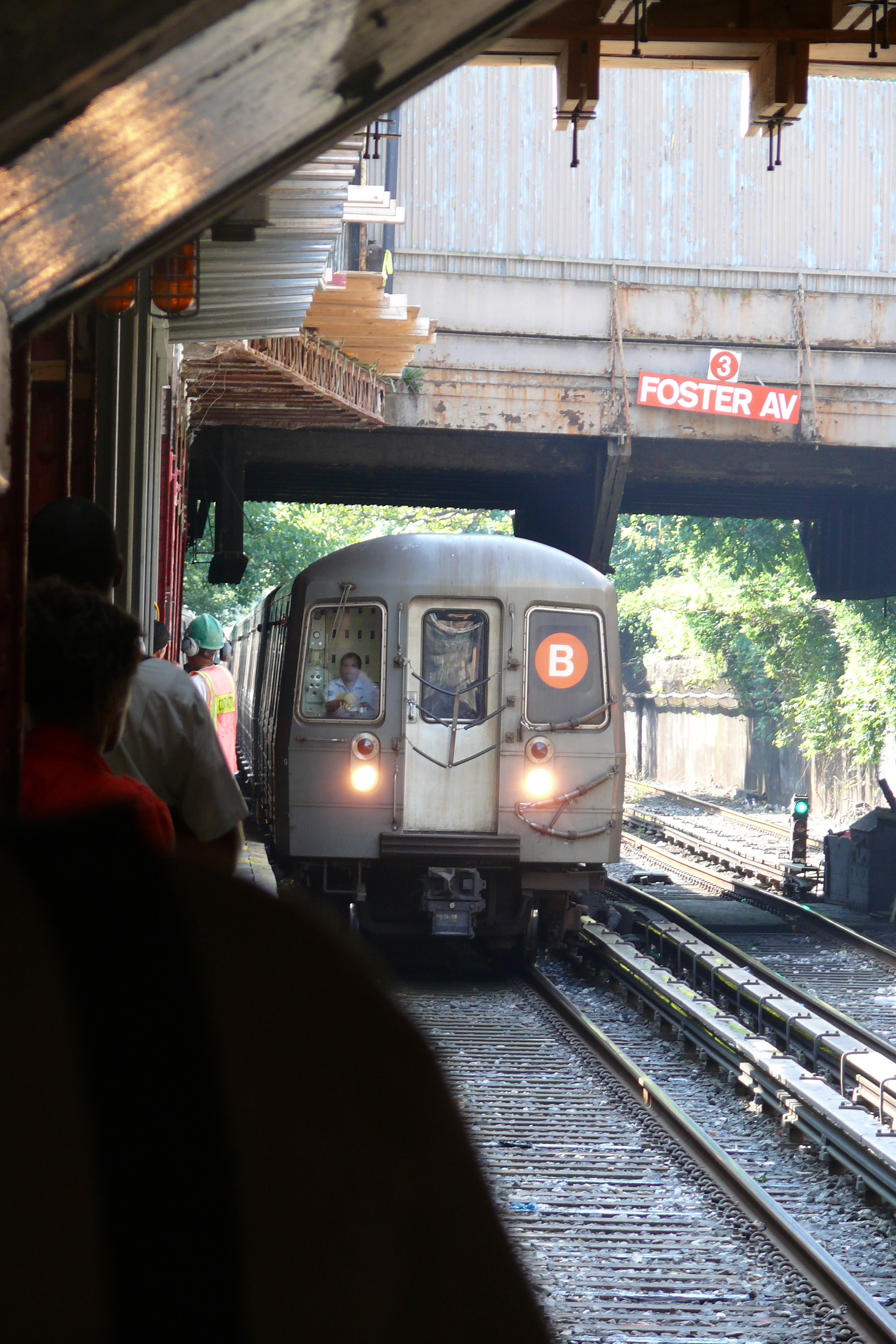
B train of R68As arriving

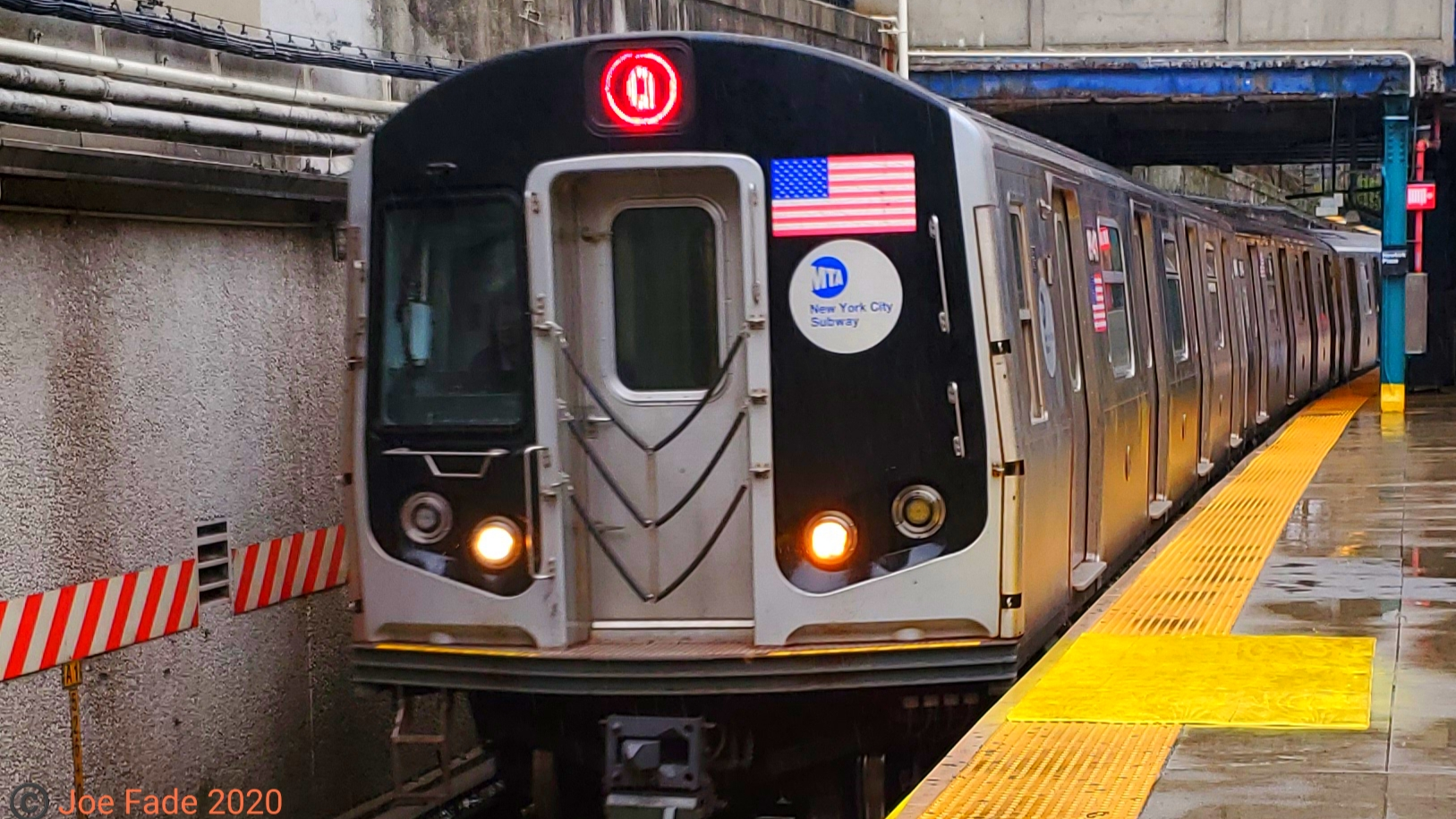
Q train of R160s arriving
