= Avenue H station =

New York City Subway station in Brooklyn

Avenue H
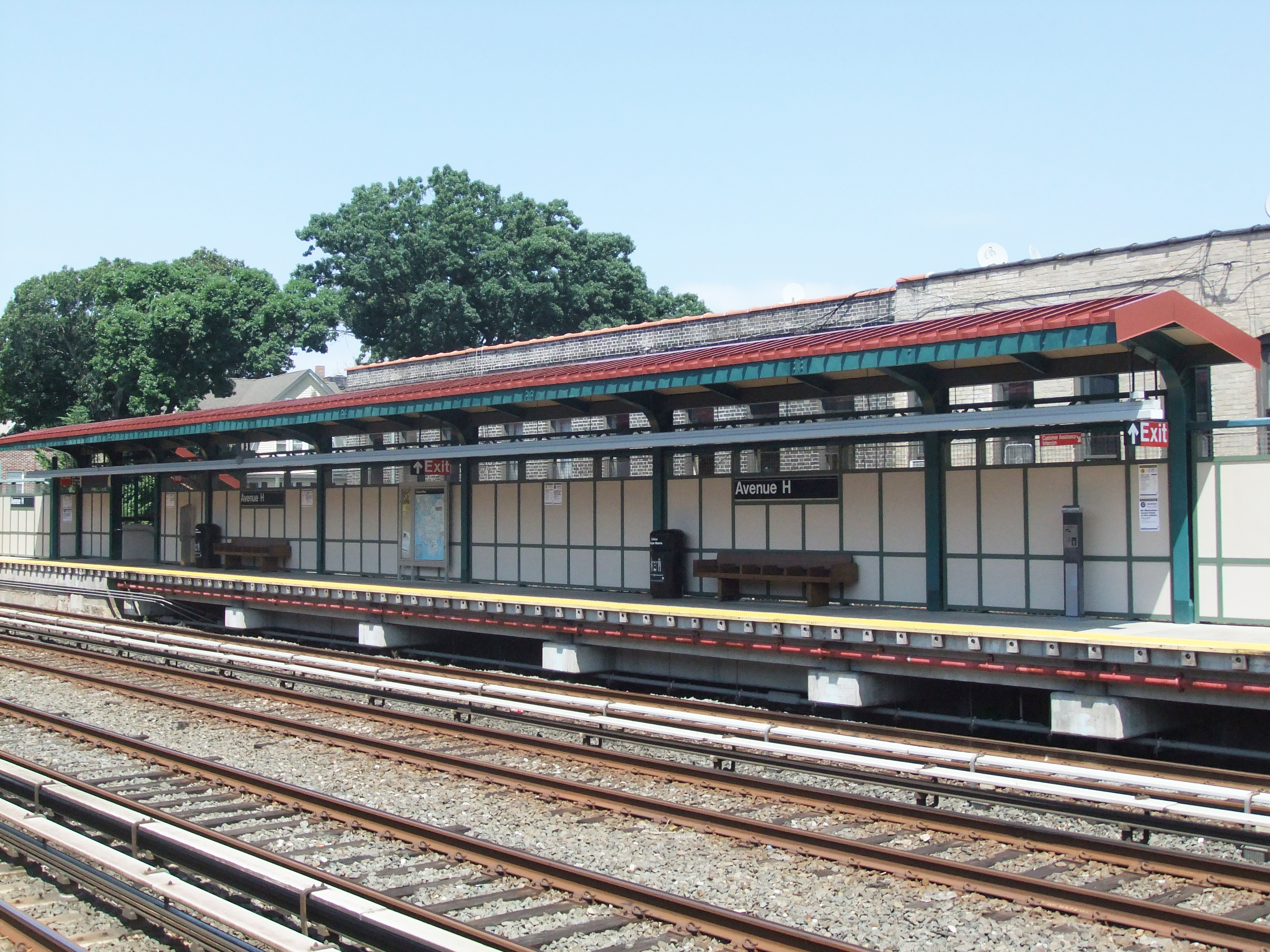
- View of northbound platform

Station statistics
- Address: Avenue H & East 16th Street; Brooklyn, New York
- Borough: Brooklyn
- Locale: Midwood, Flatbush, Fiske Terrace
- Coordinates: 40.630003°N 73.962016°W
- Division: B (BMT)
- Line: BMT Brighton Line
- Services: Q (all times)
- Structure: Embankment / At-Grade
- Platforms: 2 side platforms
- Tracks: 4

Other information
- Opened: April 26, 1897
- Accessible: Yes
- Former/other names: Fiske Terrace

Traffic
- 2025: 735,466 ▲9.1%
- Rank: 351 out of 423
Services
Preceding station	New York City Subway	Following station
Newkirk Plaza toward 96th Street	Local	Avenue J toward Coney Island–Stillwell Avenue
does not stop here
Location
Location within New York City Subway
Location within New York City
Location within New York
Track layout
Street map
Station service legend
Symbol	Description
Stops all times	Stops all times

New York City Landmark
- Official name: Avenue H Station House
- Designated: June 29, 2004
- Reference no.: 2158

The Avenue H station is a local station on the BMT Brighton Line of the New York City Subway. It is located at Avenue H between East 15th and East 16th Streets near the border of Midwood and Flatbush, Brooklyn. The station is served by the Q train at all times.

The Avenue H station was opened on or around April 26, 1897 as Fiske Terrace, a two-track surface station serving the new planned community of Fiske Terrace in Midwood, Brooklyn. It served the Kings County Elevated Railway and then the Brooklyn Rapid Transit Company (BRT). The station house serving the northbound platform, built in 1906 as a sales office for Fiske Terrace, was converted to a passenger facility shortly afterward when the station was substantially rebuilt in 1907. The Avenue H station became part of the Brooklyn–Manhattan Transit Corporation (BMT) system in 1923 and the New York City Transit system in 1940. It was renovated in the first decade of the 21st century.

The Avenue H station contains two side platforms and four tracks; express trains use the inner two tracks to bypass the station. The platforms sit on an embankment slightly above ground level and crosses above the Bay Ridge Branch of the Long Island Rail Road. There is a station house adjacent to each platform. The station house serving the northbound platform is a New York City designated landmark. Both platforms' station houses contain ramps from the street, which make the station compliant with the Americans with Disabilities Act of 1990. The southbound ramp was completed in September 2011; a ramp for the northbound platform was completed in June 2021.

== History ==
=== Early history ===
The Brooklyn, Flatbush and Coney Island Railway (BF&CI; now the BMT Brighton Line) opened in 1878. There was originally no station at the site of what is now Avenue H station. The nearest stations were South Midwood to the north and South Greenfield to the south, while Avenue H site did not have any station, though the railway passed below the nearby New York & Manhattan Beach Railway (now LIRR). The BF&CI was reorganized as the Brooklyn and Brighton Beach Railroad in 1887 and was subsequently leased by the Kings County Elevated Railway (KCER) in 1896. The KCER was subsumed into the Brooklyn Rapid Transit Company (BRT) by 1899.

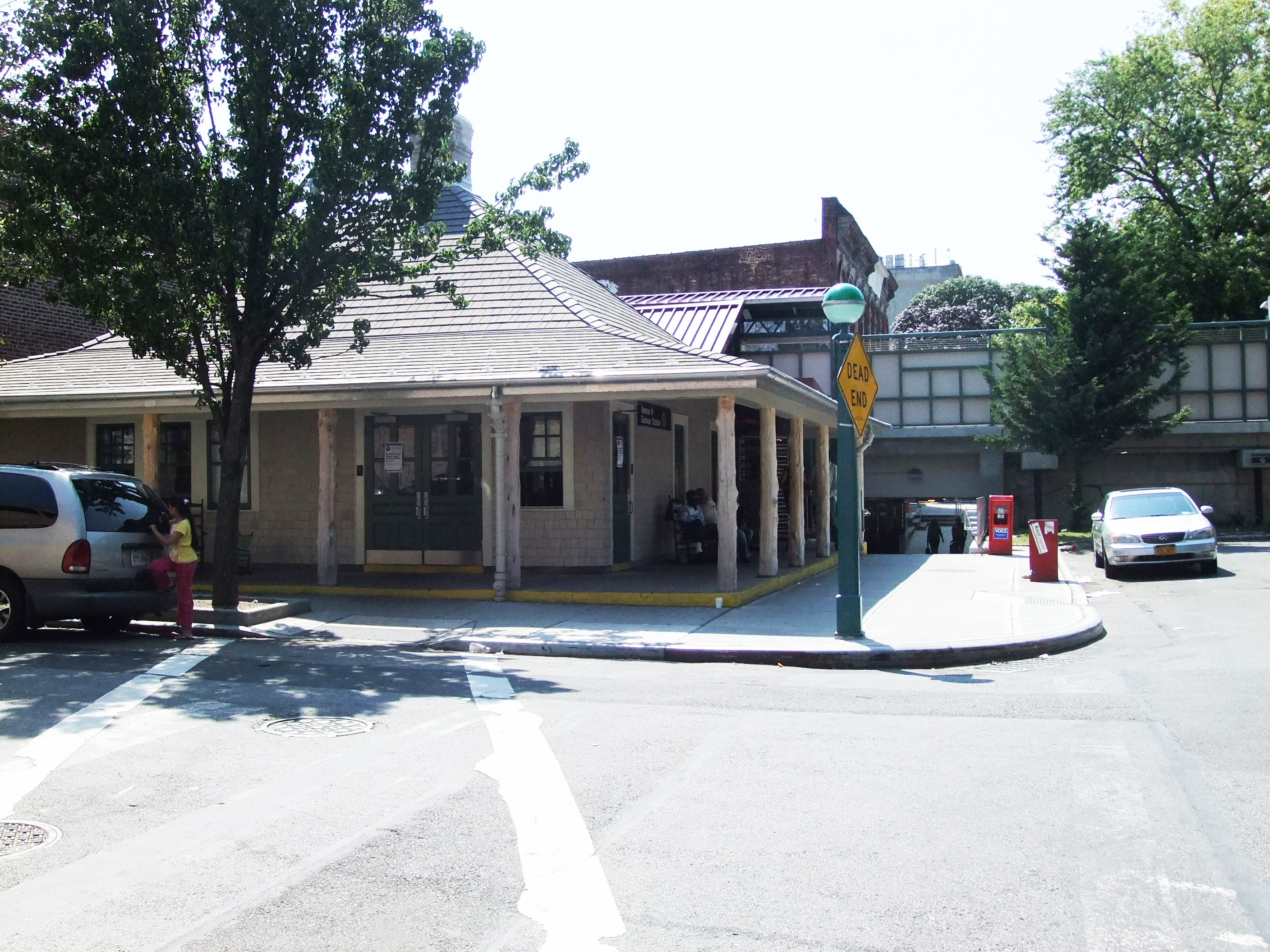
Northbound station house, originally a sales office

What is now the Avenue H station opened April 27, 1897 on land contributed by the Fiske Brothers. as a two-track surface station on the BRT's Brighton Beach Line. The first station house was a small structure at the northeast corner of Avenue H and the railroad.

On June 8, 1905 Thomas Benton Ackerson paid $285,000 to George P. and Elizabeth Fiske for their Flatbush estate with a mansion (since demolished) called Fiske Terrace. Ackerson's T.B. Ackerson Company soon began construction, and named the development Fiske Terrace after the estate.

According to a 1907 brochure for the development, the company so swiftly transformed the land "from a wooded hilltop to a high class developed Suburban Home Site" that the project would "go down in history as being the most rapidly developed of its kind on record."

In 1906 Ackerson built a real estate office on the southwest corner of East 15th Street and Avenue to sell homes in their development. In a contemporary brochure the building was depicted as having exterior siding and other materials made of wood.

The sales office was converted to railroad use and "debuted as a transit station" on August 23, 1907, and was renamed "Avenue H". In this same time frame, the Brighton Beach Line was rebuilt as a four-track railroad and regraded from Church Avenue to Sheepshead Bay. This rebuilding placed the Avenue H station at the transition point between the open cut to the north and the embankment to the south. after which the railway was to pass over the Bay Ridge Branch and the nearby Manhattan Beach Junction station; previously, the line crossed underneath the Bay Ridge Branch. With the station house on the surface, the station remained open during the regrading project.

On August 1, 1920, a tunnel under Flatbush Avenue opened, connecting the Brighton Line to the Broadway subway in Manhattan. At the same time, the line's former track connections to the Fulton Street Elevated were severed. Subway trains from Manhattan and elevated trains from Franklin Avenue served Brighton Line stations, sharing the line to Coney Island.

The Brighton Line became part of the Brooklyn–Manhattan Transit Corporation (BMT) in 1923 and then became the property of the City of New York in 1940.

=== 21st century ===
In 2003, the Metropolitan Transportation Authority announced plans to demolish the station house, citing its wood construction as a fire hazard. The community objected, emphasizing the building's historic importance, architectural significance, connection to the adjacent community and the fact that several other wooden station houses on the subway system were already city landmarks. On June 29, 2004, the exterior of the station house was designated a landmark by the New York City Landmarks Preservation Commission, although this designation did not affect the interior. The contract to "restore the landmark station control house" as well as rehabilitation of the platforms and other stations structures was advertised for bids by the MTA for January 2007.

This station underwent reconstruction from September 2009 to December 2011. Both platforms were rebuilt with new windscreens, canopies, and tactile strip edges. The respective platform being rebuilt was closed while it was under renovation. An additional unstaffed station house the southbound platform was added on adjacent property at Avenue H. The new station house includes an ADA-accessible ramp. The northbound station house was also renovated, and several turnstiles were added to the station. The station fully reopened in September 2011 and the northbound station house was completed two months later at a cost of $47.6 million.

Northbound accessibility for this station was proposed in February 2019 as part of the MTA's "Fast Forward" program. By September 2020, the accessible ramp from the northbound station house to the northbound platform was expected to be completed in June 2021. The work started in October 2020 and necessitated minor service diversions; it also created a park at the dead-end on Avenue H west of East 16th Street. To facilitate the construction of an accessible wheelchair ramp, the northbound platform was closed for renovations during March and April 2021. The ramp was completed on June 29, 2021, and was officially dedicated in mid-July 2021. The project cost $14 million. At the time of the ramp's completion, the New York City Subway system had 26 ramps, and the Avenue H station was one of only 14 stations in the system with ramps.

Plans for the Interborough Express, a light rail line using the Bay Ridge Branch right of way, were announced in 2023. As part of the project, a light rail station at East 16th Street has been proposed next to the existing Avenue H subway station.

== Station layout ==
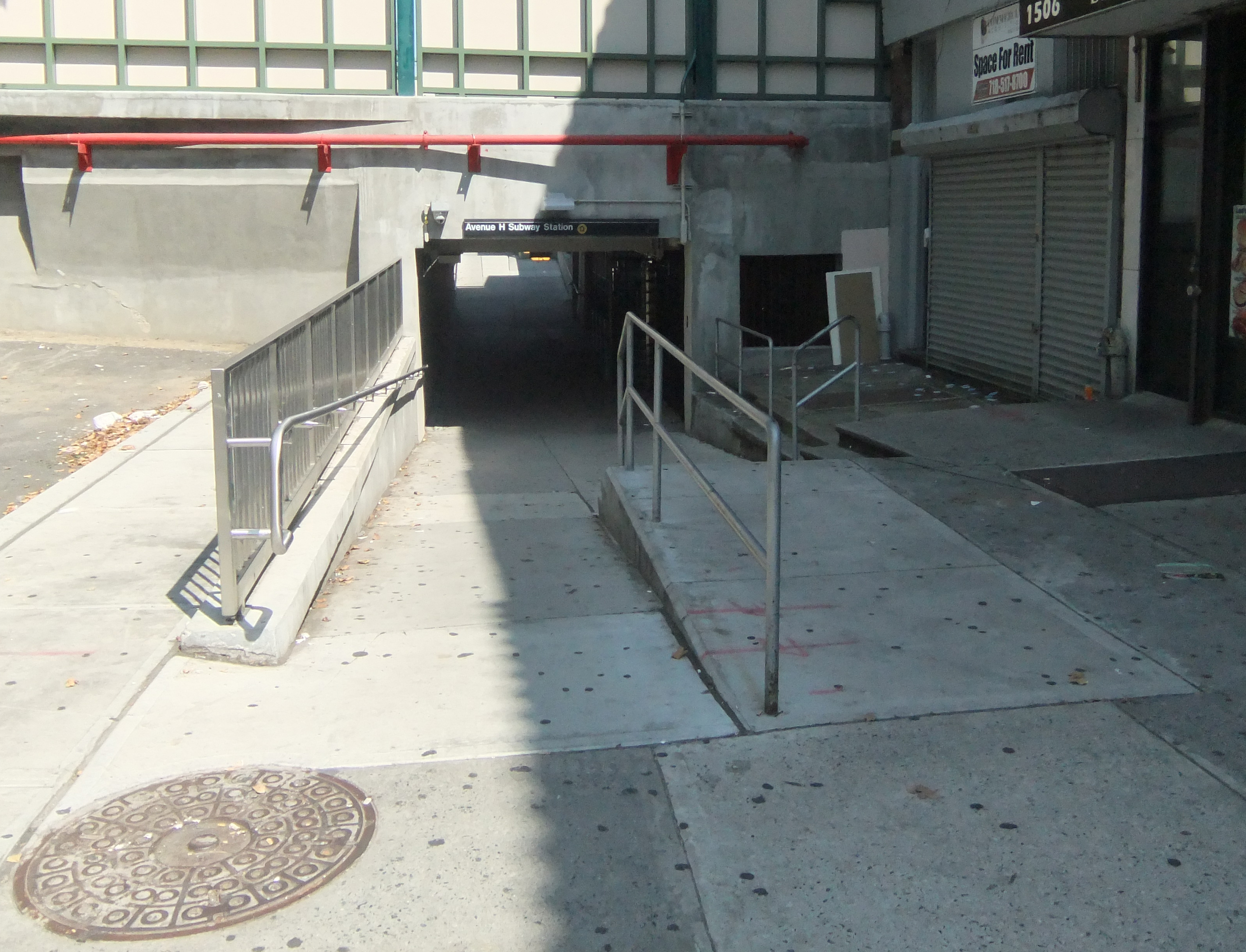
The passageway underneath the tracks at Avenue H

The Avenue H station is laid out in a typical local stop setup. There are four tracks and two side platforms. The center two tracks are the express tracks used by the B train on weekdays. North of the station, the roadbed ramps down to an open-cut. South of the station, the line is on a raised earthen embankment. The station platform lies over the Bay Ridge Branch crossing which exists between Avenues H and I.

Due to the change in elevation, the north end of this station is slightly above ground level. Avenue H dead-ends on both sides of the line and vehicles cannot pass between the two sections of the avenue, but a pedestrian underpass connects the sidewalk on both sides.

The southbound (Coney Island-bound) local track is technically known as A1 while the northbound (Manhattan-bound) one is A2; the "A" designation is used for chaining purposes along the Brighton Line from the Manhattan Bridge to Coney Island. Although they cannot be accessed at Avenue H, the southbound and northbound express tracks are known as A3 and A4, respectively.

=== Exits ===
==== Northbound station house ====
Northbound station house

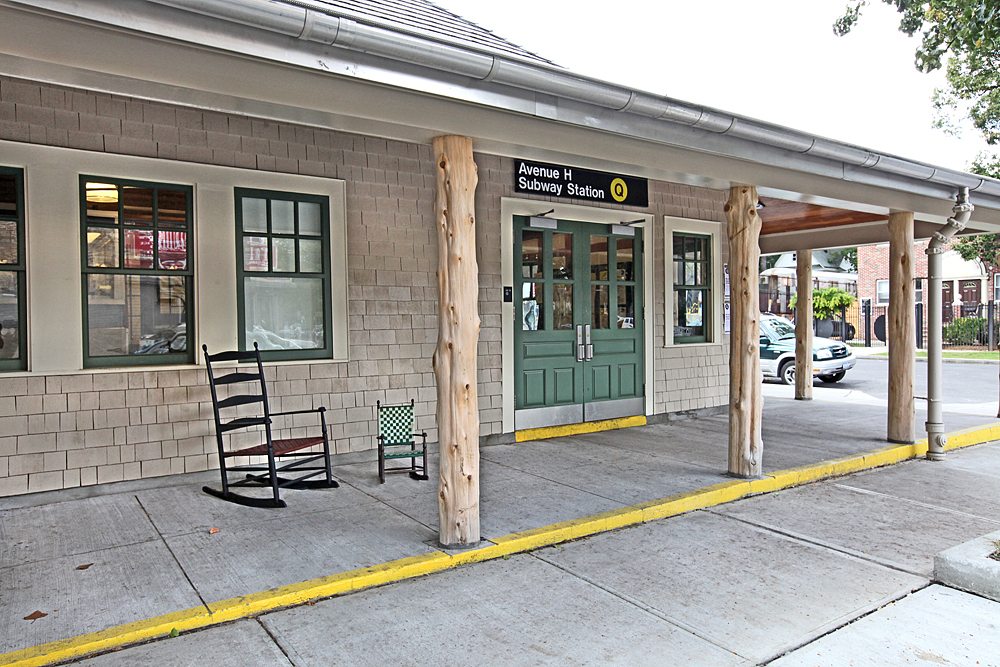
Exterior

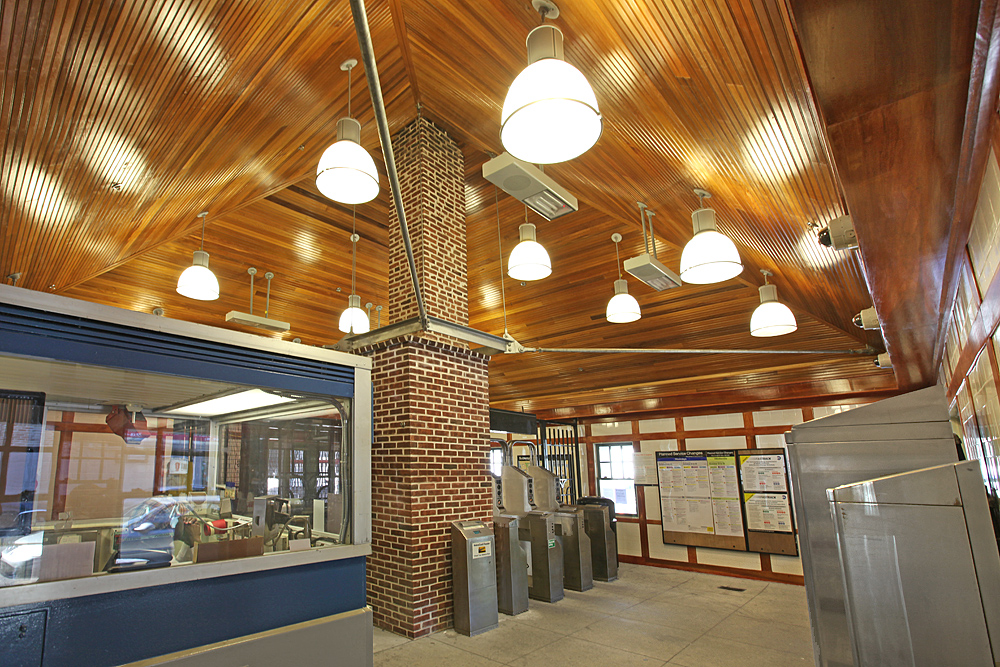
Interior

The main entrance is the station house on the east side of the tracks, adjacent to the northbound platform on the south side of Avenue H. Designed in a similar Colonial Revival and Queen Anne style to the neighborhood's residences, the station house is one story high and contains wooden shingles on its facade. The pyramidal roof is covered in asphalt shingles and has a brick corbelled chimney. A portico with peeled-log wooden posts wraps around the station house, with overhanging eaves. The station house, designated by the New York City Landmarks Preservation Commission as a city landmark in 2004, is the only such structure in the New York City Subway system that was not originally intended as a rapid transit facility.

There are several doorways into the station house. The Avenue H facade, along the north side of the station building, consists of four bays with two wood-and-glass doors leading to the fare control area. The East 16th Street facade, along the east side, also is four bays wide but contains two wood-and-glass doors, a storefront, and a roll-down gate. There is modern signage along the exterior of the station house. Inside the station house, there are turnstiles and a full-time booth. There is also a HEET adjacent to the station house, from which a stair leads to the northbound platform, and an underpass leads to a single staircase to the Coney Island-bound platform. Access to these stairs is also available via turnstiles in the underpass. There is an exit-only turnstile on either side of the underpass.

==== Southbound station house ====
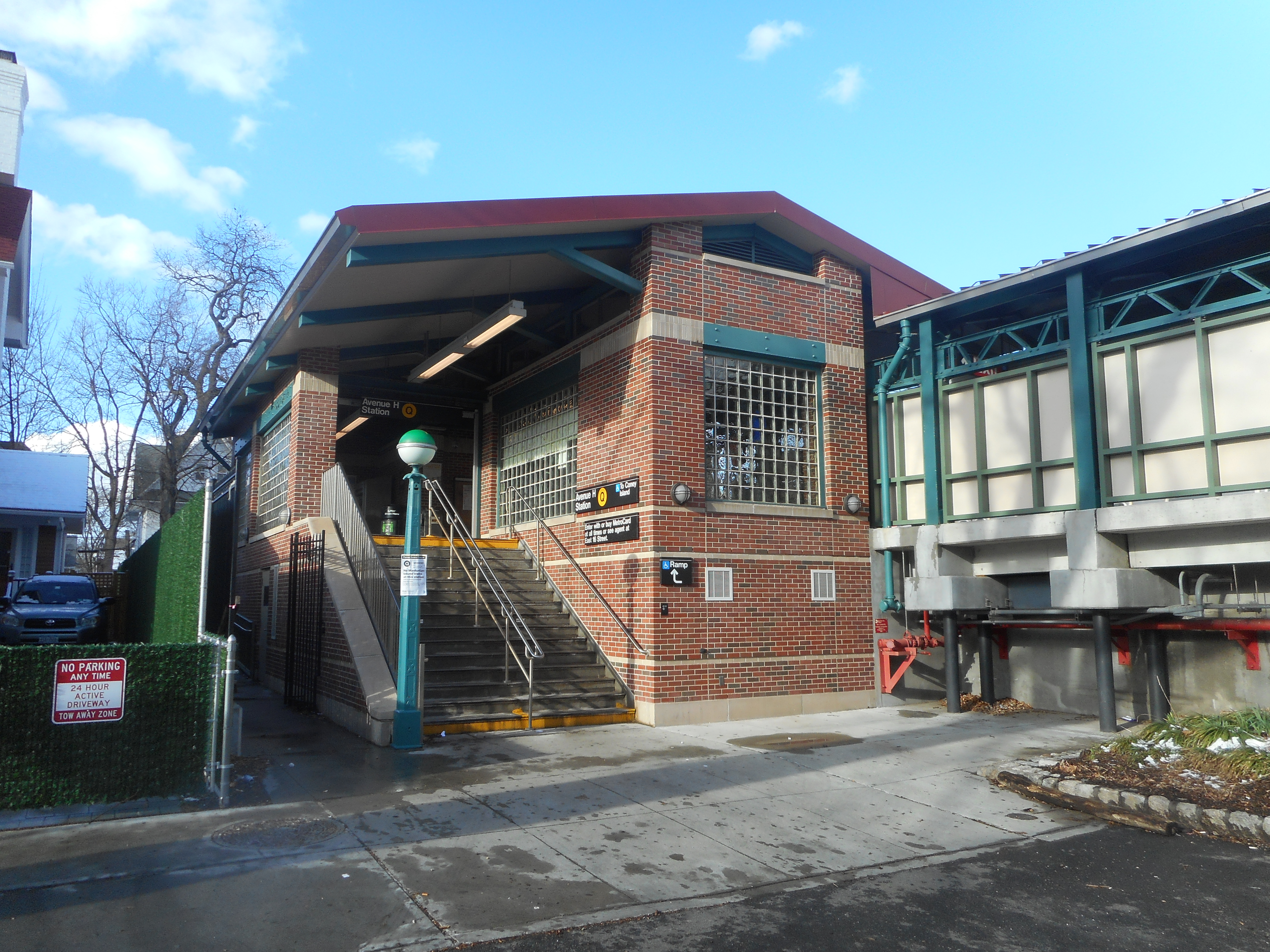
Southbound station house

Another station house is on the north end of the southbound platform, adjacent to the west side of the track. The ADA-accessible ramp and a stair leads to the unstaffed brick station house. The ramp wraps around the station house to adjust for the height difference between the station house and ground level. This station house contains a bank of regular and High Entry/Exit Turnstiles.

== Nearby points of interest ==
- Brooklyn College
- Midwood High School

== See also ==
- Manhattan Beach Branch
- Bay Ridge Branch
