= Cortelyou Road station =

New York City Subway station in Brooklyn

Cortelyou Road
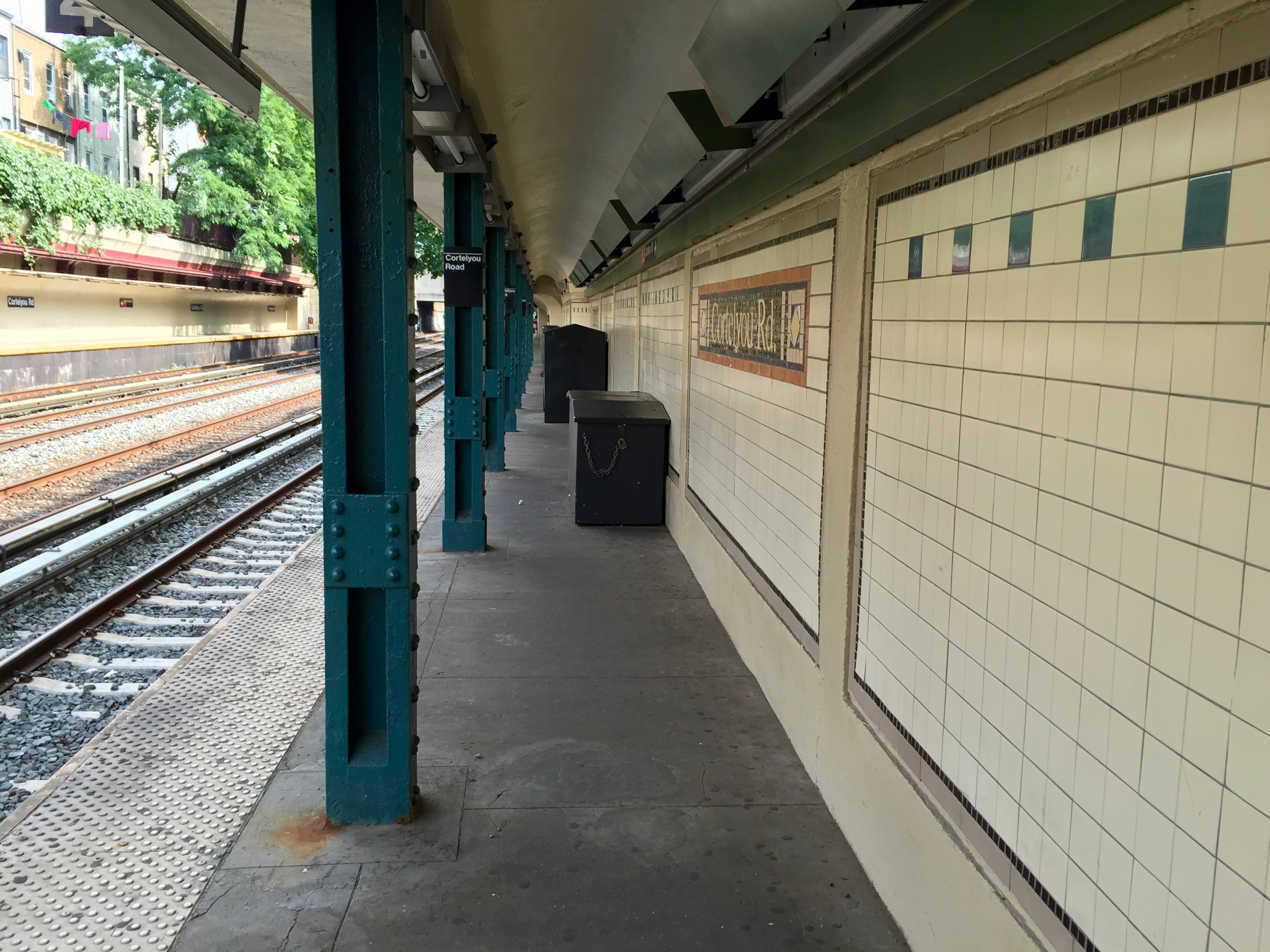
- Southbound platform

Station statistics
- Address: Cortelyou Road & East 16th Street; Brooklyn, New York
- Borough: Brooklyn
- Locale: Ditmas Park, Flatbush
- Coordinates: 40.641597°N 73.9643°W
- Division: B (BMT)
- Line: BMT Brighton Line
- Services: Q (all times)
- Transit: MTA Bus: B103, BM1, BM2, BM3, BM4
- Structure: Open-cut
- Platforms: 2 side platforms
- Tracks: 4

Other information
- Opened: original station: c. 1900
- Rebuilt: current station: 1907; 119 years ago
- Former/other names: Avenue C

Traffic
- 2025: 1,461,253 ▲9.6%
- Rank: 232 out of 423
Services
| Preceding station | New York City Subway | Following station |
|---|---|---|
| Beverley Road toward 96th Street | Local | Newkirk Plaza toward Coney Island–Stillwell Avenue |
does not stop here
Location
Location within New York City Subway
Location within New York City
Location within New York
Track layout
Street map
Station service legend
| Symbol | Description |
| Stops all times | Stops all times |

The Cortelyou Road station is a local station on the BMT Brighton Line of the New York City Subway, located at Cortelyou Road between Marlborough Road (East 15th Street) and East 16th Street in the neighborhood of Flatbush, Brooklyn. The station is served by the Q train at all times.

== History ==
The station, and the road it is named after, are named for 17th-century tutor and surveyor Jacques Cortelyou, who had a hand in the establishment of New Utrecht.

The original station at this location was opened around 1900 as a two-track street-level side platform station running south from a grade crossing at Avenue C. The station was established to serve the commercial area of Avenue C, a major thoroughfare which boasted the only east–west streetcar line between Church Avenue in Flatbush and Sheepshead Bay. The current station house and below-grade platforms were completed at the end of 1907. At the same time, the station was renamed from Avenue C to Cortelyou Road.

On August 1, 1920, a tunnel under Flatbush Avenue opened, connecting the Brighton Line to the Broadway subway in Manhattan. At the same time, the line's former track connections to the Fulton Street Elevated were severed. Subway trains from Manhattan and elevated trains from Franklin Avenue served Brighton Line stations, sharing the line to Coney Island.

During the 1964–1965 fiscal year, the platforms at Cortelyou Road, along with those at six other stations on the Brighton Line, were lengthened to 615 feet (187 m) to accommodate a ten-car train of 60 feet (18 m)-long cars, or a nine-car train of 67 feet (20 m)-long cars.

In April 1993, the New York State Legislature agreed to give the MTA $9.6 billion for capital improvements. Some of the funds would be used to renovate nearly one hundred New York City Subway stations, including Cortelyou Road. Between 1994 and 1996, the station was completely rebuilt with new turnstiles, waiting areas, stairways, and a new token booth. The platforms were renovated and brighter fluorescent lighting was added. A temporary token booth was constructed during the renovation. During the end of the station project, southbound trains bypassed the station between October 11 and November 17, 1995, and northbound trains did the same between November 18 and December 22, 1995. Between December 22, 1995, and April 1996, southbound trains only stopped at the station for exiting only.

From July to October 28, 2013, the northbound platform was closed as part of a component repair project. From February 21 to June 13, 2014, the southbound platform was closed as part of a $3.2 million component repair project, which included work at the Beverley Road and Parkside Avenue stations.

== Station layout ==
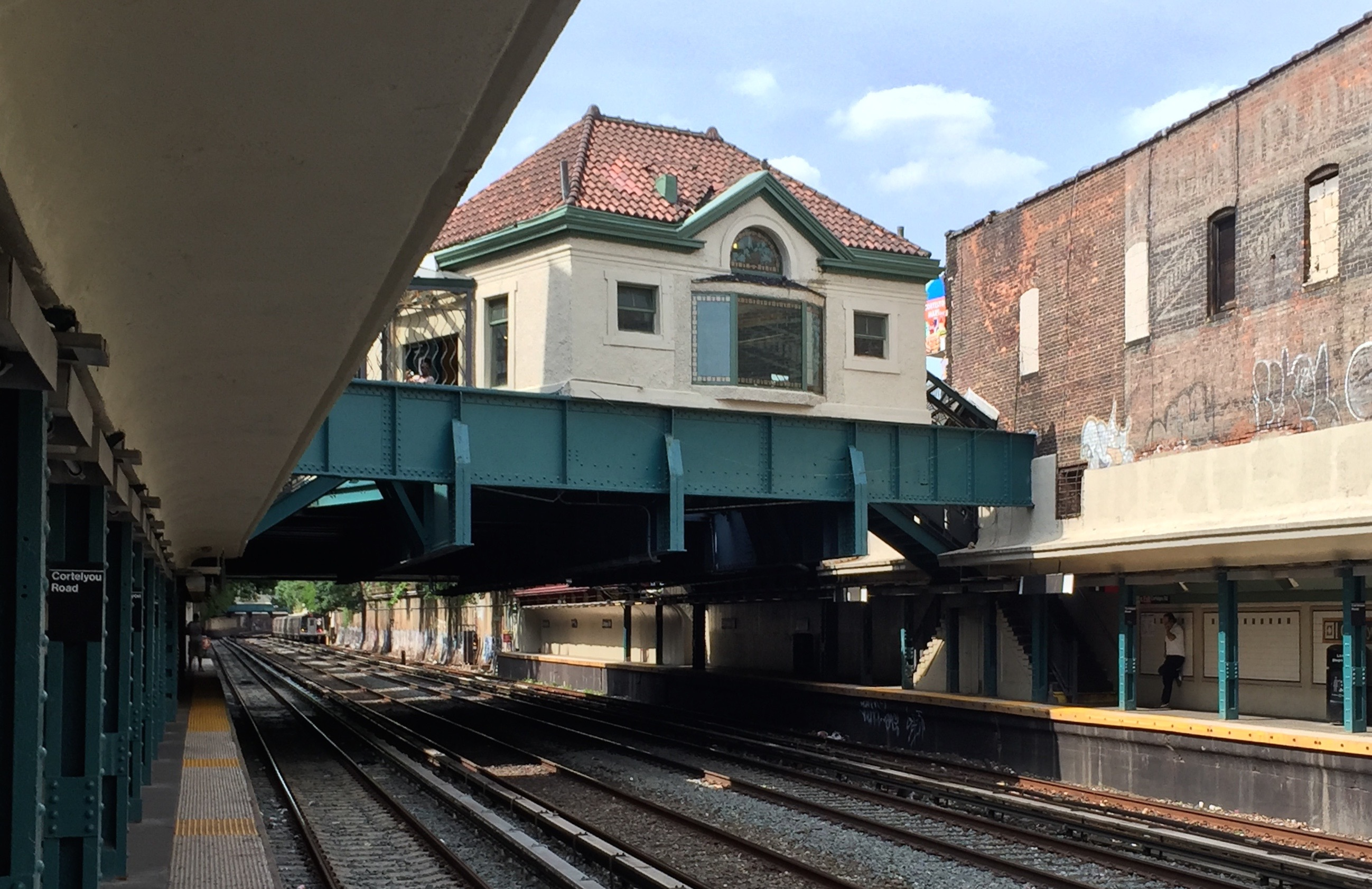
Station house, with the Beverley Road station in the distance

This open-cut station has four tracks and two side platforms, typical for a New York City Subway local station.

The station physically resembles the nearby Beverley Road station as the layout and station house are both the same. There are some differences, however. This station has blue columns while Beverley Road has green, there is a signal house for New York City Transit use on the north end that replicates the station house across the street, and the location of the station house in relation to the platforms is slightly to the north, compared to the same location at Beverley Road. Colors at this station are green and beige. The Beverley Road and Cortelyou Road stations are the closest operational stations in the New York City Subway system, being 500 ft (150 m) apart.

=== Exit ===
The station's sole entrance is through a station house at Cortelyou Road between Marlborough Road and East 16th Street. The station house features artwork called Garden Stops by Patsy Norvell, which has etched images of leaves on the glass windows inside fare control facing the south. The artwork can be seen from both inside the mezzanine and while standing on either platform to the south; this artwork is also visible at the neighboring Beverley Road station.

== See also ==
- Jacques Cortelyou
- Cortelyou Library
