= Coney Island Avenue =

Avenue in Brooklyn, New York

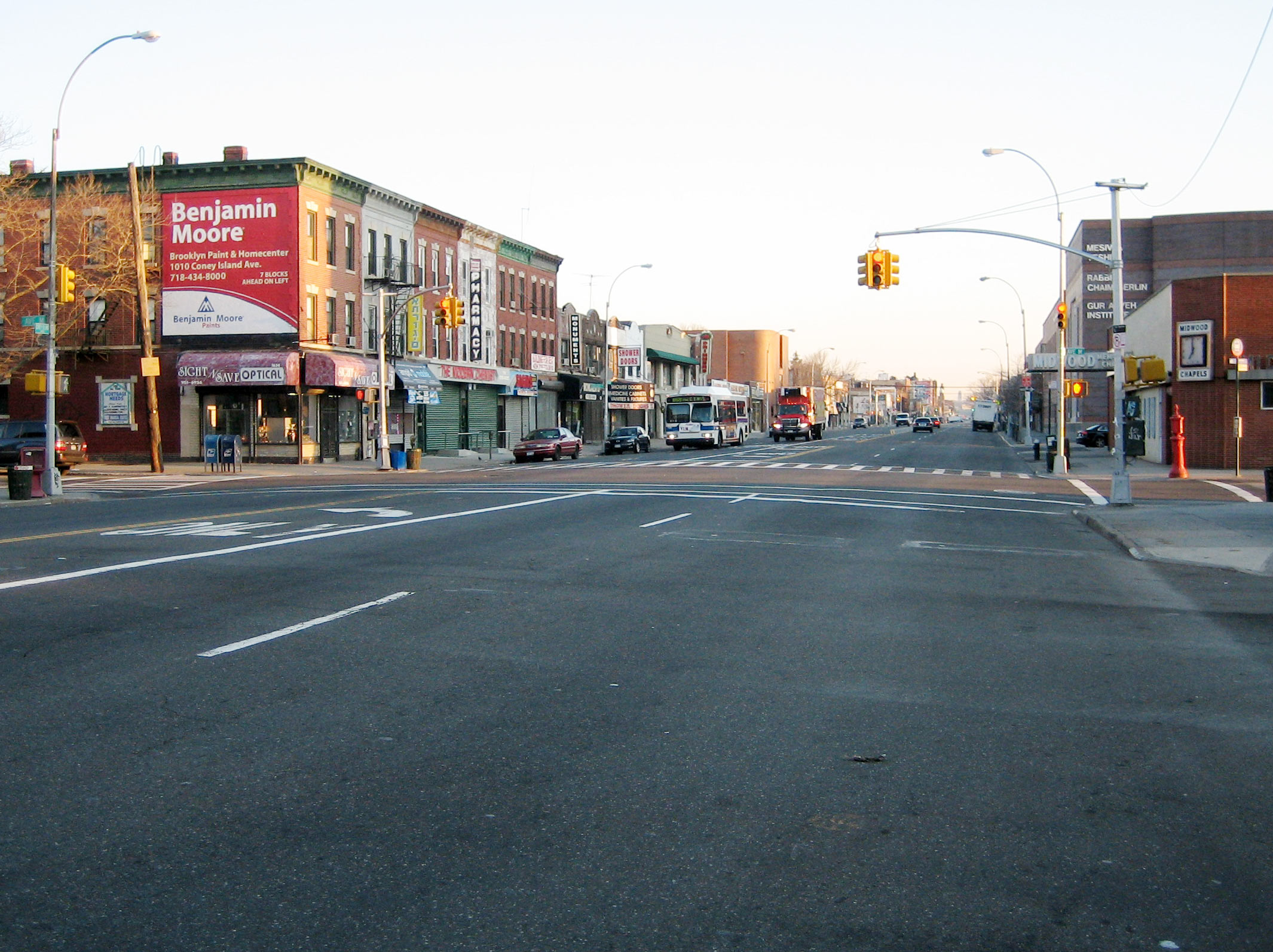
- Coney Island Avenue & Avenue M
- Interactive map of Coney Island Avenue
- Owner: City of New York
- Maintained by: NYCDOT
- Length: 5.3 mi (8.5 km)
- Location: Brooklyn, New York City
- Coordinates: 40°36′44.56″N 73°57′46.11″W
- South end: Riegelmann Boardwalk in Brighton Beach
- Major junctions: Belt Parkway in Brighton Beach; NY 27 in Prospect Park South
- North end: NY 27 / Parkside Avenue in Windsor Terrace
- East: 11th/12th Streets
- West: 9th/10th Streets

Coney Island Avenue is a road in the New York City borough of Brooklyn that runs north-south for a distance of roughly five miles, almost parallel to Ocean Parkway and Ocean Avenue. It begins at Brighton Beach Avenue in Brighton Beach and goes north to Park Circle at the southwest corner of Prospect Park, where it becomes Prospect Park Southwest. The central lanes of near-parallel Ocean Parkway terminate five blocks south and three blocks west of that intersection, becoming the Prospect Expressway (New York State Route 27). Ocean Parkway originally extended uninterrupted north to Park Circle, where Coney Island Avenue meets Prospect Park, until construction of the Prospect Expressway broke it up, replacing the central portion of the northern half-mile of Ocean Parkway and including ramps to the edge of Prospect Park. Narrow roadways on either side of Ocean Parkway (showing as "Ocean Parkway" on street signs) still continue to Park Circle.

Coney Island Avenue frontage is dominated by mixed-use housing: pre-war apartment buildings, small shops, including many antique shops, and service businesses. It is also one of the most dangerous streets in New York City, with many avoidable accidents happening because of poor road design.

== Public transportation ==
Coney Island Avenue is served by the following:

- The B68 bus line
- The Brighton Beach station
- The 15th Street-Prospect Park station
- The B103 Limited and BM3/BM4 express buses and Cortelyou Road.
- The BM1/BM2 bus
- The B8 bus
- The B11 bus

== History ==
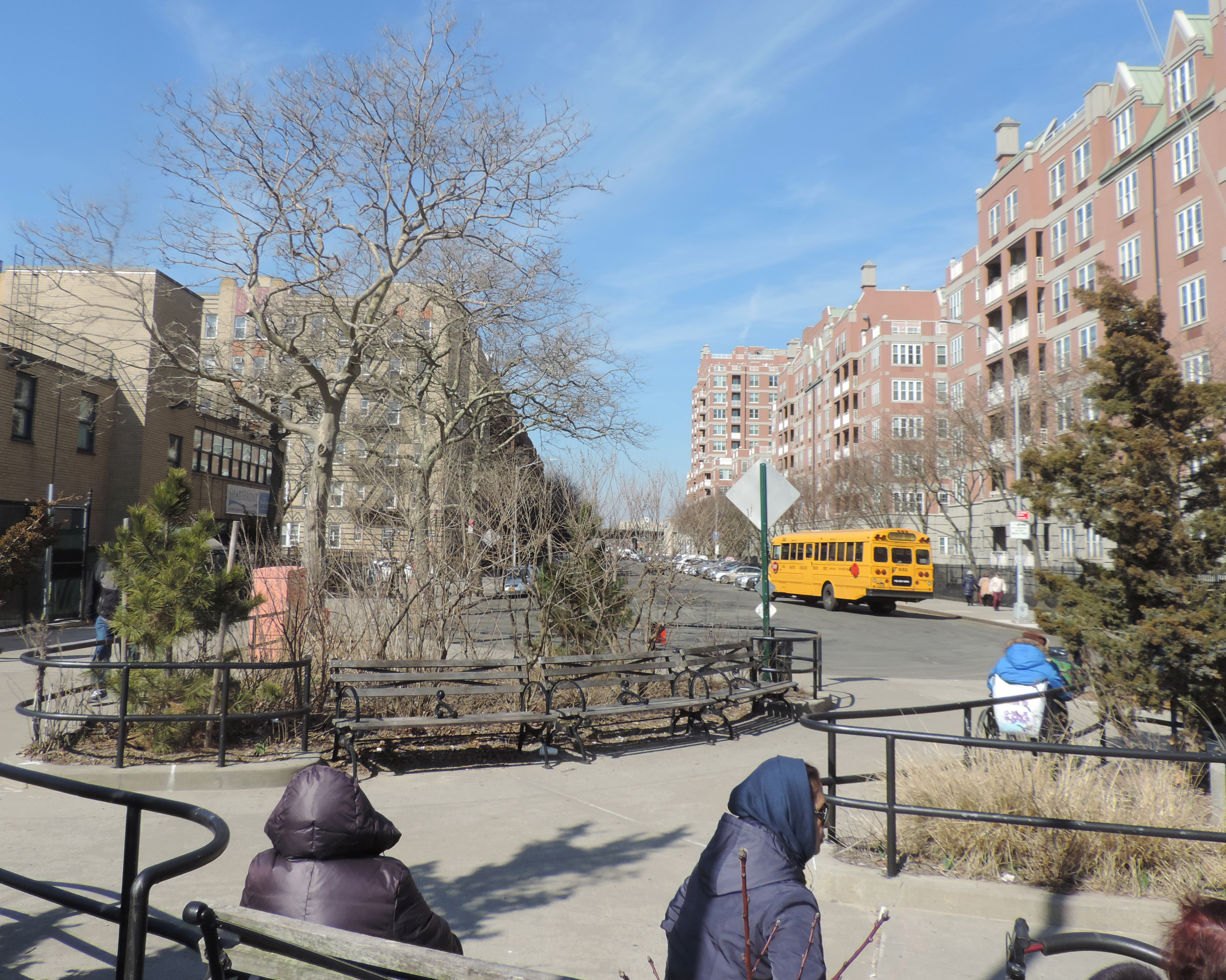
South end of Coney Island Avenue

An area surrounding about 1 mile (1.6 km) of Coney Island Avenue is home to a sizable population of Pakistani Americans, and is informally called "Little Pakistan". In 2021, the U.S. Census Bureau estimated that approximately 7,000 Pakistanis lived in a region bordering the street, and they made up nearly 10% of the population of the region.
