= Edmond J. Safra Synagogue =

Edmond J. Safra Synagogue can refer to:

- Edmond J. Safra Synagogue (Brooklyn), a synagogue in Brooklyn along Ocean Parkway and Avenue U
- Edmond J. Safra Synagogue (Manhattan), a synagogue located along 63rd Street in Manhattan near Central Park
- Edmond J. Safra Synagogue (Florida), a synagogue located near Miami, Florida.
- Edmond J. Safra Synagogue, located within the European Jewish Center in Paris, France.
- Edmond J. Safra Grand Choral Synagogue, or more commonly known as the Grand Choral Synagogue of Saint Petersburg, in Saint Petersburg, Russia
