= Brighton Beach station (BMT Brighton Line) =

New York City Subway station in Brooklyn

Brighton Beach
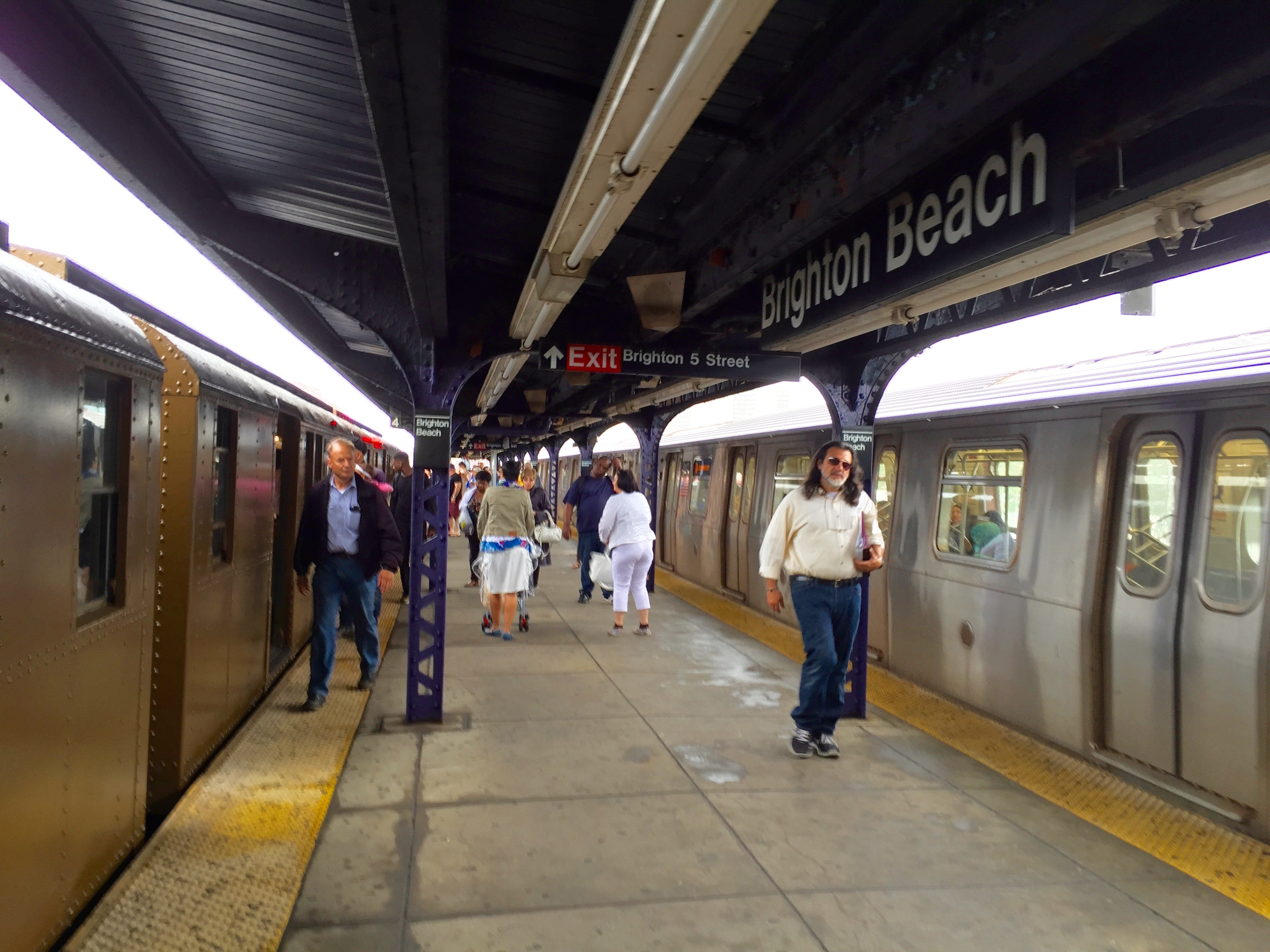
- Southbound platform, with a museum train of D-type Triplexes on the left

Station statistics
- Address: Brighton Sixth Street & Brighton Beach Avenue; Brooklyn, New York
- Borough: Brooklyn
- Locale: Brighton Beach
- Coordinates: 40.577598°N 73.961565°W
- Division: B (BMT)
- Line: BMT Brighton Line
- Services: B (weekday rush hours, middays and early evenings); Q (all times)
- Transit: NYCT Bus: B1, B68
- Structure: Elevated
- Platforms: 2 island platforms cross-platform interchange
- Tracks: 4

Other information
- Opened: original station: July 2, 1878; 148 years ago
- Rebuilt: current station: 1907; 119 years ago
- Accessible: No; planned

Traffic
- 2025: 2,480,745 ▼0.5%
- Rank: 149 out of 423
Services
Preceding station	New York City Subway	Following station
Sheepshead Bay B Q northbound	Express	Terminus
Sheepshead Bay B Q northbound	Local	Ocean Parkway Q toward Coney Island–Stillwell Avenue
Non-revenue services and lines
Preceding station	New York City Subway	Following station
	no service	Ocean Parkway express
Location
Location within New York City Subway
Location within New York City
Location within New York
Track layout
Street map
Station service legend
Symbol	Description
Stops all times	Stops all times
Stops weekdays during the day	Stops weekdays during the day

The Brighton Beach station is an elevated express and terminal station on the BMT Brighton Line of the New York City Subway. It is located over Brighton Beach Avenue between Brighton 5th Street and Brighton 7th Street in Brighton Beach, Brooklyn. The station is served by the Q train at all times and is the southern terminal for the B train on weekdays only.

== History ==
This station opened on July 2, 1878, as part of an excursion railroad—the Brooklyn, Flatbush and Coney Island Railway—to bring beachgoers from downtown Brooklyn (via a connection with the Long Island Rail Road) to the seashore at Coney Island on the Atlantic Ocean, at a location named Brighton Beach at the same time the railroad arrived.

On August 1, 1920, a tunnel under Flatbush Avenue opened, connecting the Brighton Line to the Broadway subway in Manhattan. At the same time, the line's former track connections to the Fulton Street Elevated were severed. Subway trains from Manhattan and elevated trains from Franklin Avenue served Brighton Line stations, sharing the line to Coney Island.

During the 1964–1965 fiscal year, work was underway to lengthen the platforms to 615 feet (187 m) to accommodate a ten-car train of 60 feet (18 m)-long cars, or a nine-car train of 67 feet (20 m)-long cars.

The station was renovated during the 1990s.

From September 8, 2002, to May 23, 2004, service was suspended west of Brighton Beach to allow rebuilding of the Coney Island–Stillwell Avenue terminal station, which had deteriorated due to the effects of salt water corrosion and deferred maintenance.

As part of its 2025–2029 Capital Program, the MTA has proposed making the station wheelchair-accessible in compliance with the Americans with Disabilities Act of 1990.

== Station layout ==
Brighton Beach has two island platforms and four tracks. The weekday-only B train (Brighton Express/Sixth Avenue Express) originates and terminates here on the inner express tracks while the full-time Q train (Brighton Local/Broadway Express) stops here on the outer local tracks, and continues to and from Coney Island–Stillwell Avenue. The next stop to the west (railroad south) is Ocean Parkway for Q trains, while the next stop to the east (railroad north) is Sheepshead Bay for all service.

Between this station and Ocean Parkway, the line becomes six tracks. The local and express tracks split into an extra storage track in-between them in both directions. These tracks are commonly used for storing B trains during midday hours or at the start or end of service, and they end at bumper blocks next to the platforms at Ocean Parkway. East of this station, there are diamond crossovers used by originating and terminating B trains. The Brighton Line curves north and becomes an embankment after crossing Neptune Avenue on the approach to Sheepshead Bay.

The platforms are canopied for their entire length except for small portions at either ends. There are two elevated structures above the express tracks used for office and maintenance space.

This station has two entrances/exits, both of which are elevated station houses beneath the tracks. The full-time side is at the north end and has two staircases from each platform, a large waiting area inside fare control, regular turnstile bank, and token booth. Outside of fare control, there are three street stairs, two that join at the station house balcony and go down to either southern corners of Brighton 7th Street and Brighton Beach Avenue and one to the northwest corner. Instead of a staircase, the northeast corner has a narrow, enclosed escalator that always goes up and thus can only be used to enter the station.

The second station house has a single staircase from each platform and a pair of twin staircases going down to either side of Brighton Beach Avenue between Brighton Fifth and Brighton Sixth Streets. The token booth and regular turnstile bank here is only open weekdays from 6:00 a.m. to 9:00 p.m. Two HEET turnstiles provide access to/from this entrance at other times.

This station was renovated in the mid to late 1990s and included installation of decorative awnings on all street stairs. The 1999 artwork here is called Mermaid/Dionysus and the Pirates by Dan George and features aluminum sculptures on both platforms.

=== Exits ===
The station has two mezzanines under the platforms and tracks, each of which has four sets of stairs to the street and one to each platform. The eastern, and staffed entrances are located between Brighton 7th Street and Coney Island Avenue. There is an up-only escalator in place of one of the stairs on the northern side of Brighton Beach Avenue at Coney Island Avenue. The western exit, which is unstaffed, is located between Brighton 5th and 6th Streets.

== Gallery ==
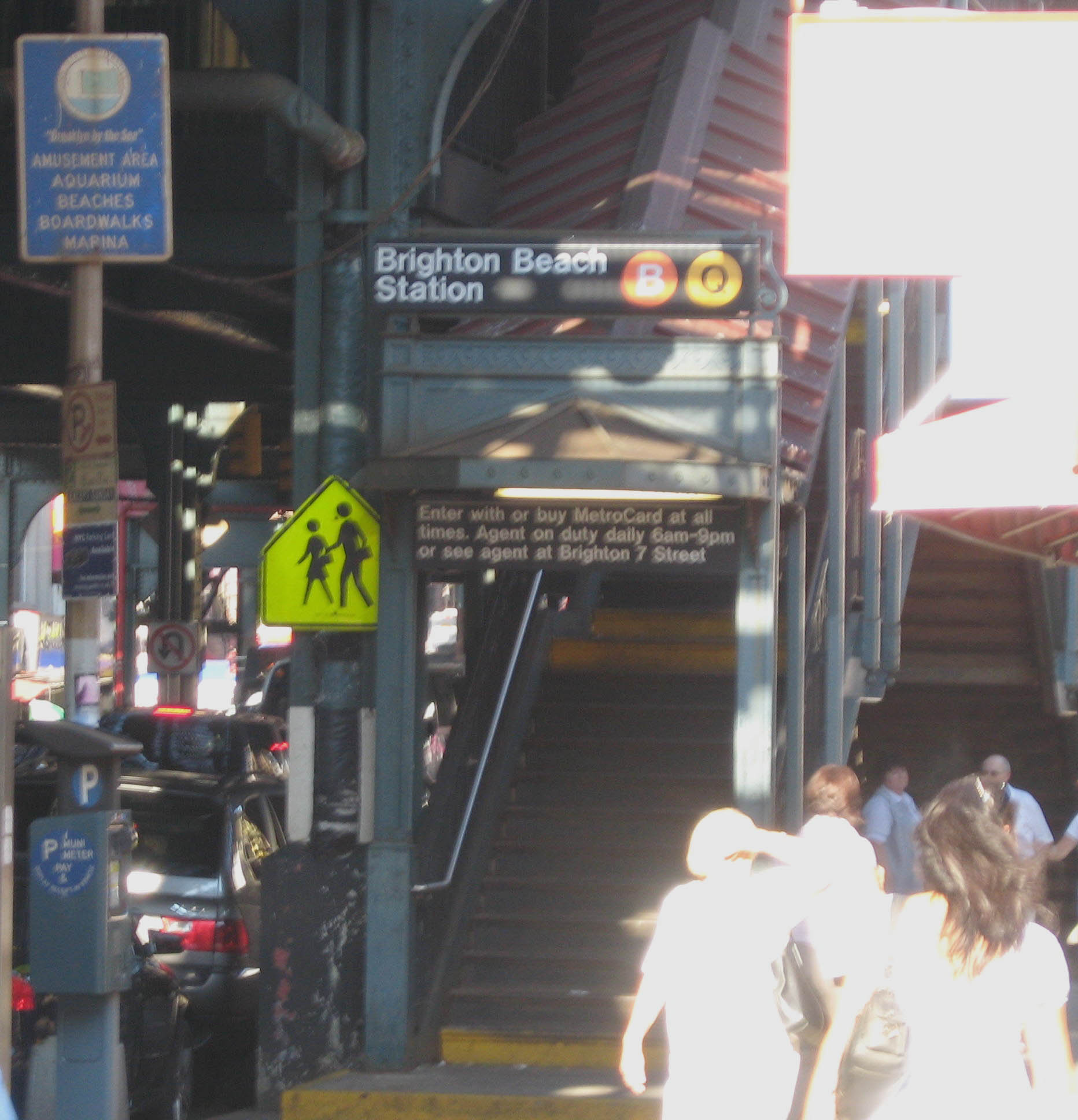
Street stair

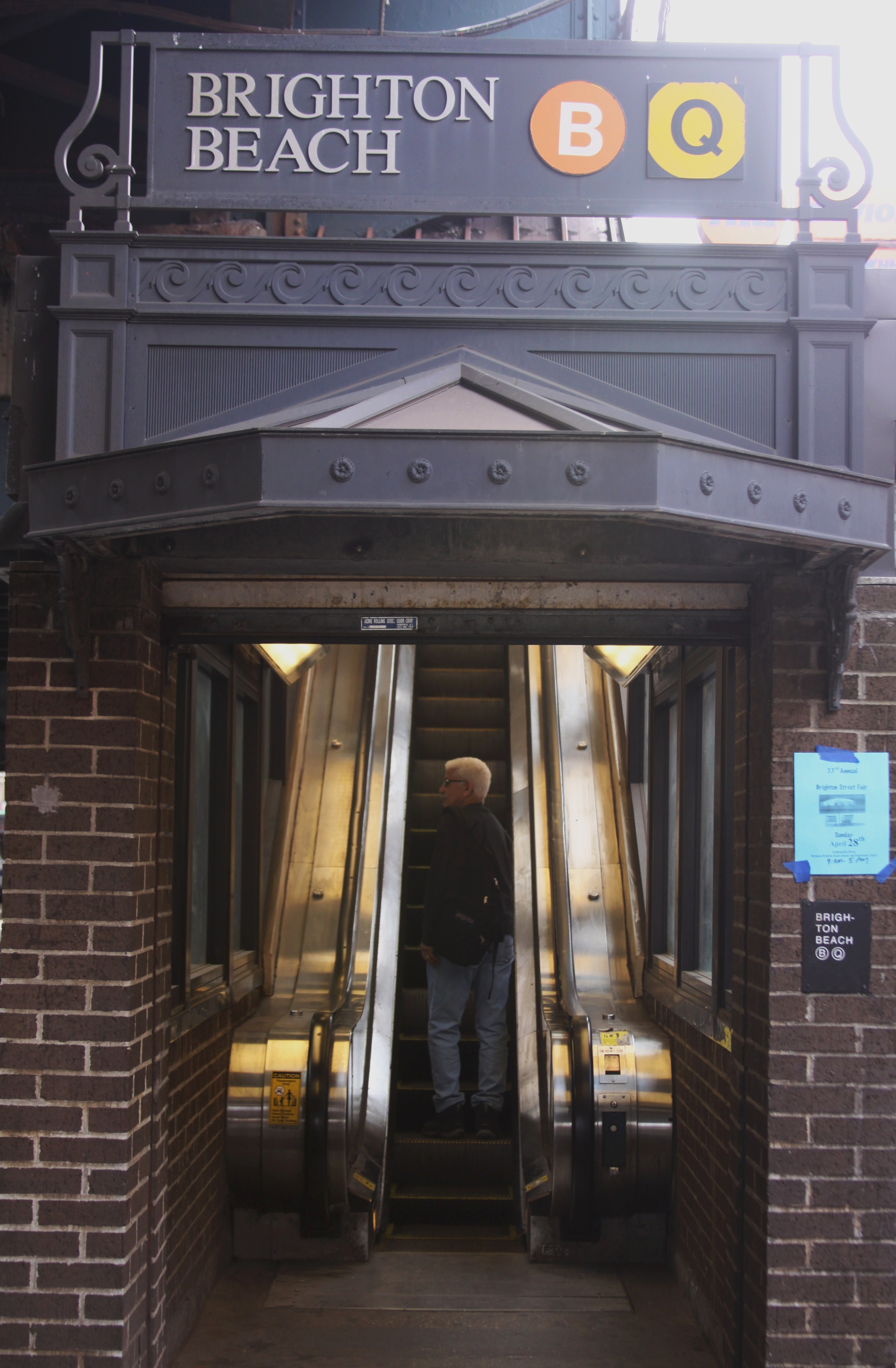
Escalator to mezzanine

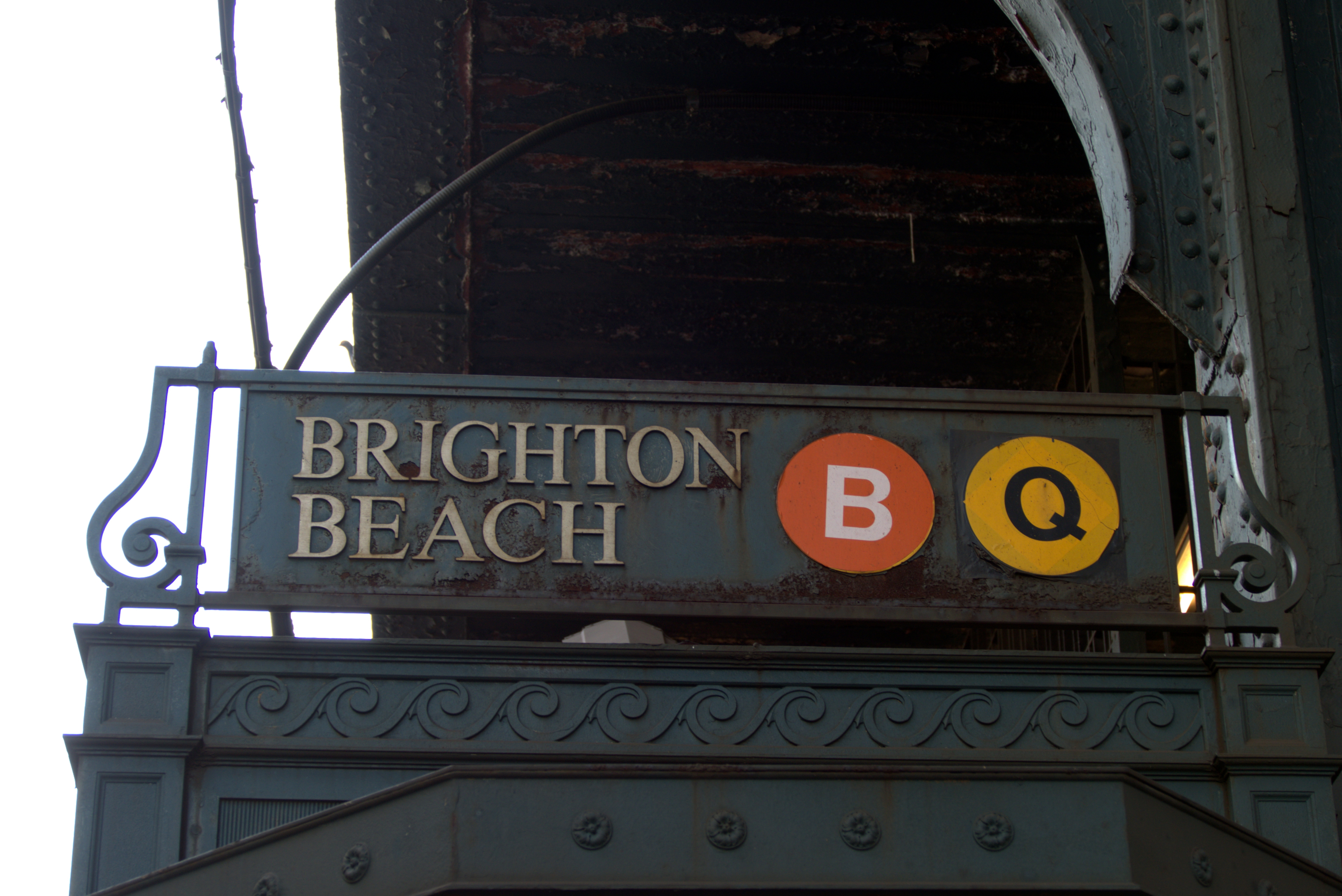
Original sign

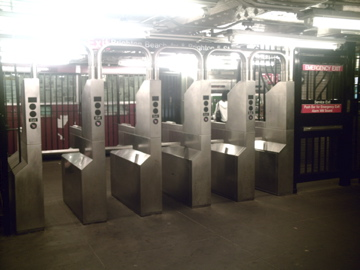
Turnstiles on the part-time mezzanine

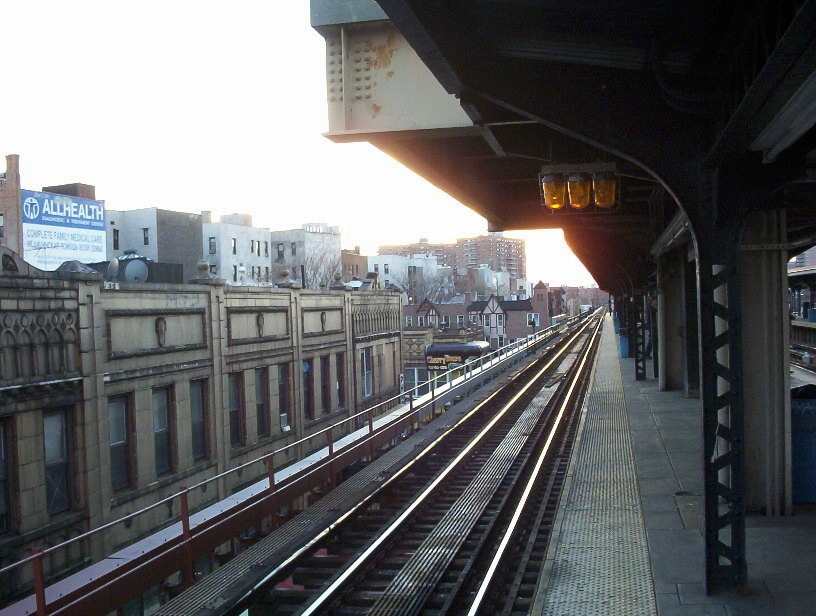
Looking down the northbound local tracks
