= Edmond J. Safra Synagogue (Brooklyn) =

Synagogue in Brooklyn, New York

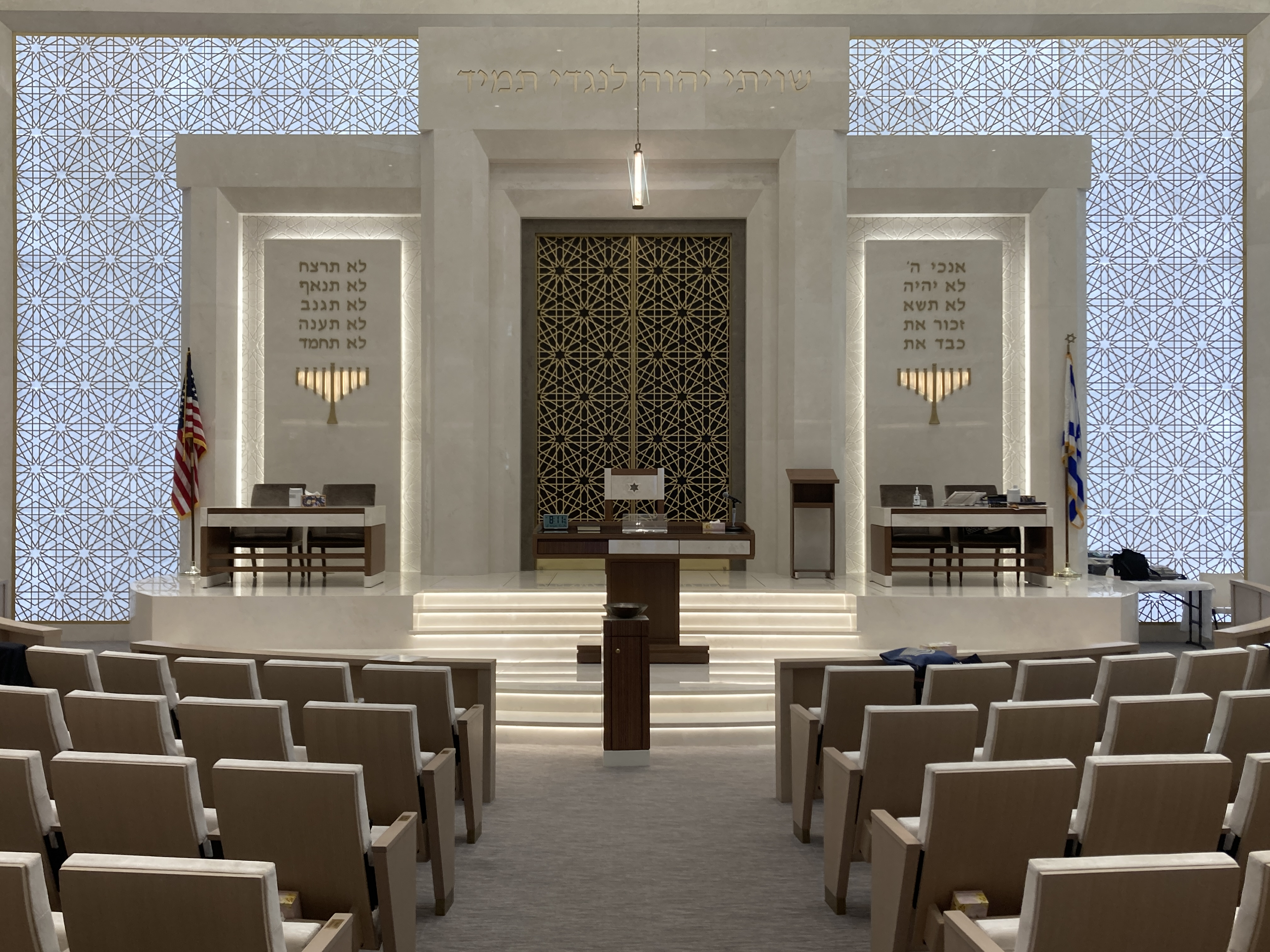
- The main sanctuary of the synagogue in 2024

- Location in New York City

Religion
- Affiliation: Orthodox Judaism
- Rite: Nusach edut mizrach
- Ecclesiastical or organizational status: Synagogue
- Leadership: Rabbi Eli Mansour; Rabbi Nathan Escava
- Status: Active

Location
- Location: 2085 Ocean Parkway, Brooklyn, New York City, New York 11223
- Country: United States
- Interactive map of Edmond J. Safra Synagogue
- Coordinates: 40°36′17″N 73°57′58″W

Architecture
- Architect: Building Studio Architects
- Type: Synagogue architecture
- Style: Moderne
- Funded by: The Edmond J Safra Foundation
- Established: 2005 (as a congregation)
- Completed: september 2023

Specifications
- Interior area: 35,000 square feet (3,300 m^{2})
- Materials: Limestone; granite

Website
- ejss.org

The Edmond J. Safra Synagogue is an Orthodox Jewish synagogue, located at 2085 Ocean Parkway in Brooklyn, New York City, New York, United States. The synagogue is one of several that are eponymous with Edmond J. Safra, a former banker and philanthropist, partially or fully funded by the Edmond J. Safra Foundation.

Founded in 2005, the congregation practices in the Sephardic rite and is composed of participants of Sephardic and Middle Eastern descent, including immigrants from: Syria, Lebanon, Egypt, Morocco, Israel, Yemen, and Turkey, along with their descendants.

The congregation is led by Rabbi Eli Mansour and Rabbi Nathan Escava.

The synagogue building was designed over a period of ten years, by Building Studio Architects, with the interior design completed by Ovadia Design Group. The limestone and granite building recalls Brooklyn's grand civic buildings from the 1920s to 1930s, with Art Deco and neo-Classical proportions and details completed in the Moderne style. The synagogue was completed in September 2023.
