= Eli Mansour =

Orthodox Sephardic Brooklyn-based rabbi

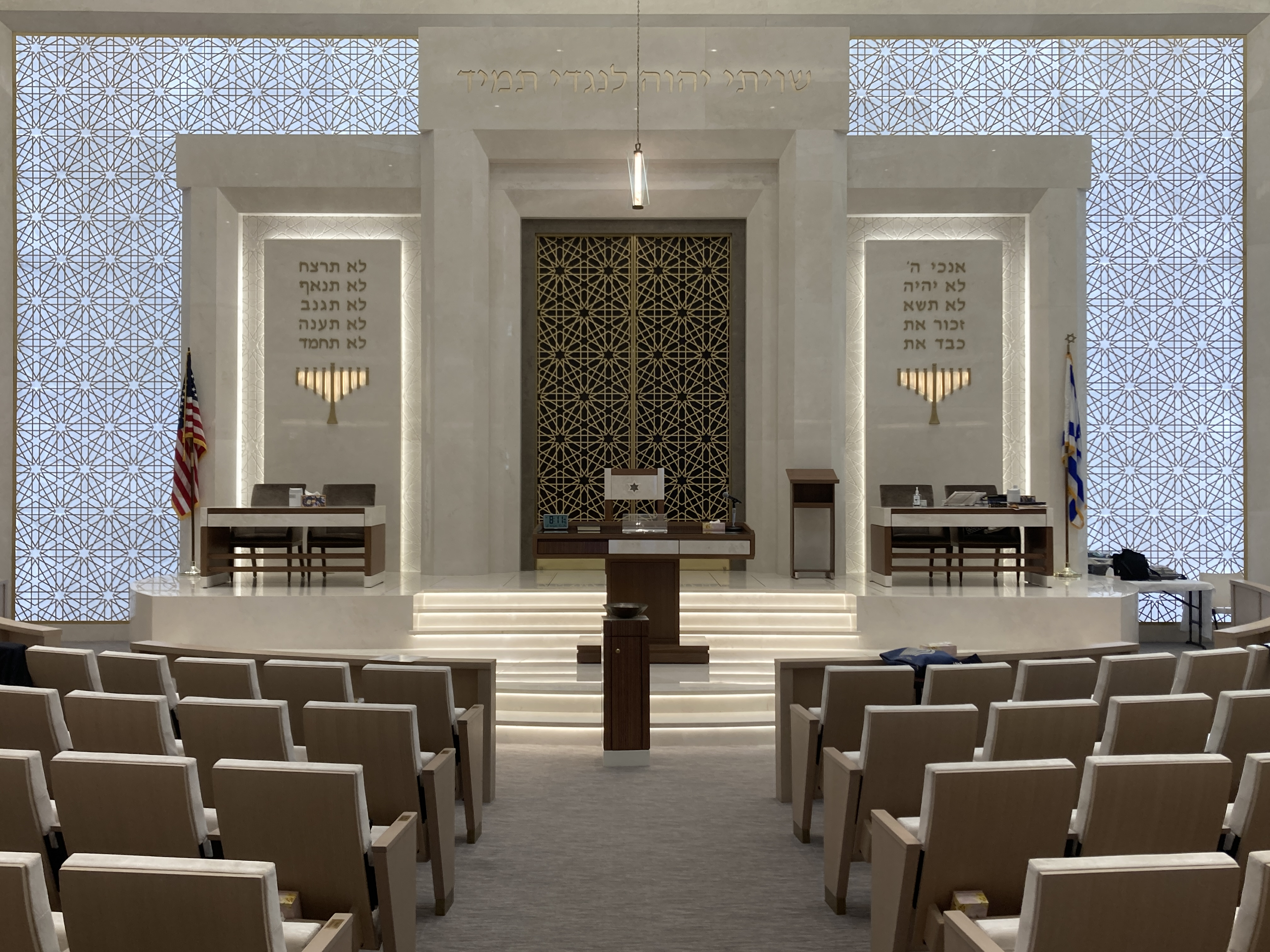
The Edmond J. Safra Synagogue (Brooklyn)

Eli J. Mansour (born 1968) is a rabbi at Edmond J. Safra Synagogue in Brooklyn.

== Education ==
Rabbi Mansour is one of the biggest Rabbi's in the Syrian-Jewish community of Brooklyn. He studied at Mercaz HaTorah in Israel, and after returning to the US at Yeshiva Ateret Torah in Brooklyn, and then Bet Midrash Gavoha in Lakewood and at Keter Tzion Kollel under Rabbi Max Maslaton, receiving ordination (Smichah) in 1998.

== Works ==
- Co-authored a Sephardic Passover Hagada published by Artscroll.
- Patah Eliyahu: The Daily Halacha, a printed version of approximately 400 Halachot and insights on every Parasha. (Artscroll)
- Living a Torah life: A Collection of Essays on Contemporary Jewish Issues

His lectures are carried on a phone-based service and are featured on seven websites.

During Rabbi Ovadia Yosef's lifetime, video recordings of his Saturday night lectures in Jerusalem would be viewed weekly in the Bnei Yosef Synagogue in Brooklyn where Rabbi Mansour would translate for the English-speaking audience.
