= Ocean Parkway station =

New York City Subway station in Brooklyn

Ocean Parkway
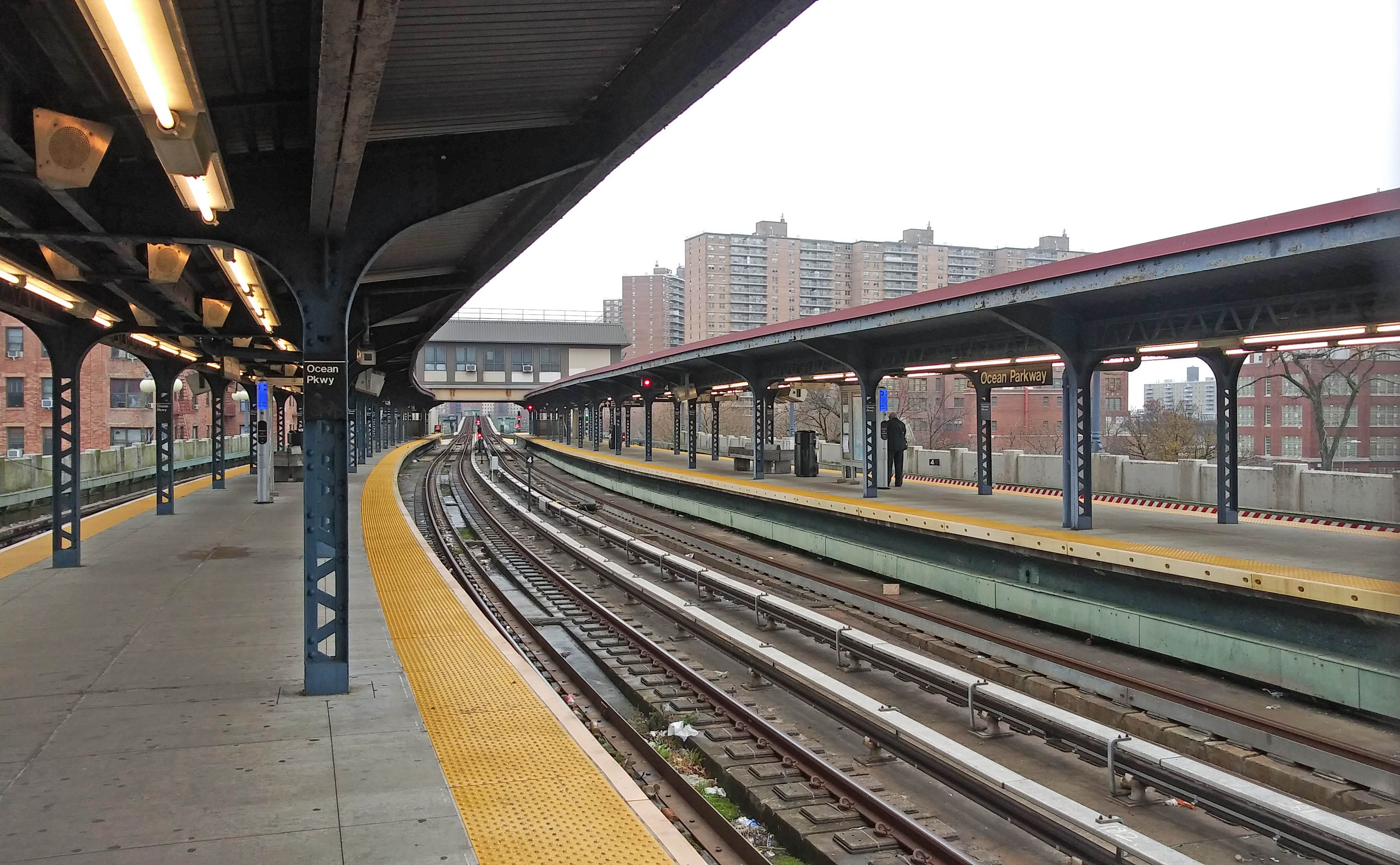
- View west from northbound platform

Station statistics
- Address: Ocean Parkway & Brighton Beach Avenue; Brooklyn, New York
- Borough: Brooklyn
- Locale: Brighton Beach, Coney Island
- Coordinates: 40.576252°N 73.968587°W
- Division: B (BMT)
- Line: BMT Brighton Line
- Services: Q (all times)
- Transit: NYCT Bus: B1, B68
- Structure: Elevated
- Platforms: 2 island platforms
- Tracks: 4 (2 in regular service)

Other information
- Opened: April 22, 1917; 109 years ago

Traffic
- 2025: 691,394 ▲1%
- Rank: 353 out of 423
Services
Preceding station	New York City Subway	Following station
Brighton Beach toward 96th Street	Local	West Eighth Street–New York Aquarium toward Coney Island–Stillwell Avenue
Non-revenue services and lines
Preceding station	New York City Subway	Following station
Brighton Beach express	no service	
Location
Location within New York City Subway
Location within New York City
Location within New York
Track layout
Street map
Station service legend
Symbol	Description
Stops all times	Stops all times
- Ocean Parkway Station (Dual System BRT)
- U.S. National Register of Historic Places
- New York State Register of Historic Places
- MPS: New York City Subway System MPS
- NRHP reference No.: 05000749
- NYSRHP No.: 04701.013852

Significant dates
- Added to NRHP: July 29, 2005
- Designated NYSRHP: May 11, 2005

The Ocean Parkway station is an express station on the New York City Subway's BMT Brighton Line. It is located at Brighton Beach Avenue and Ocean Parkway on the border of Brighton Beach and Coney Island in Brooklyn. The station is served by the Q train at all times.

== History ==
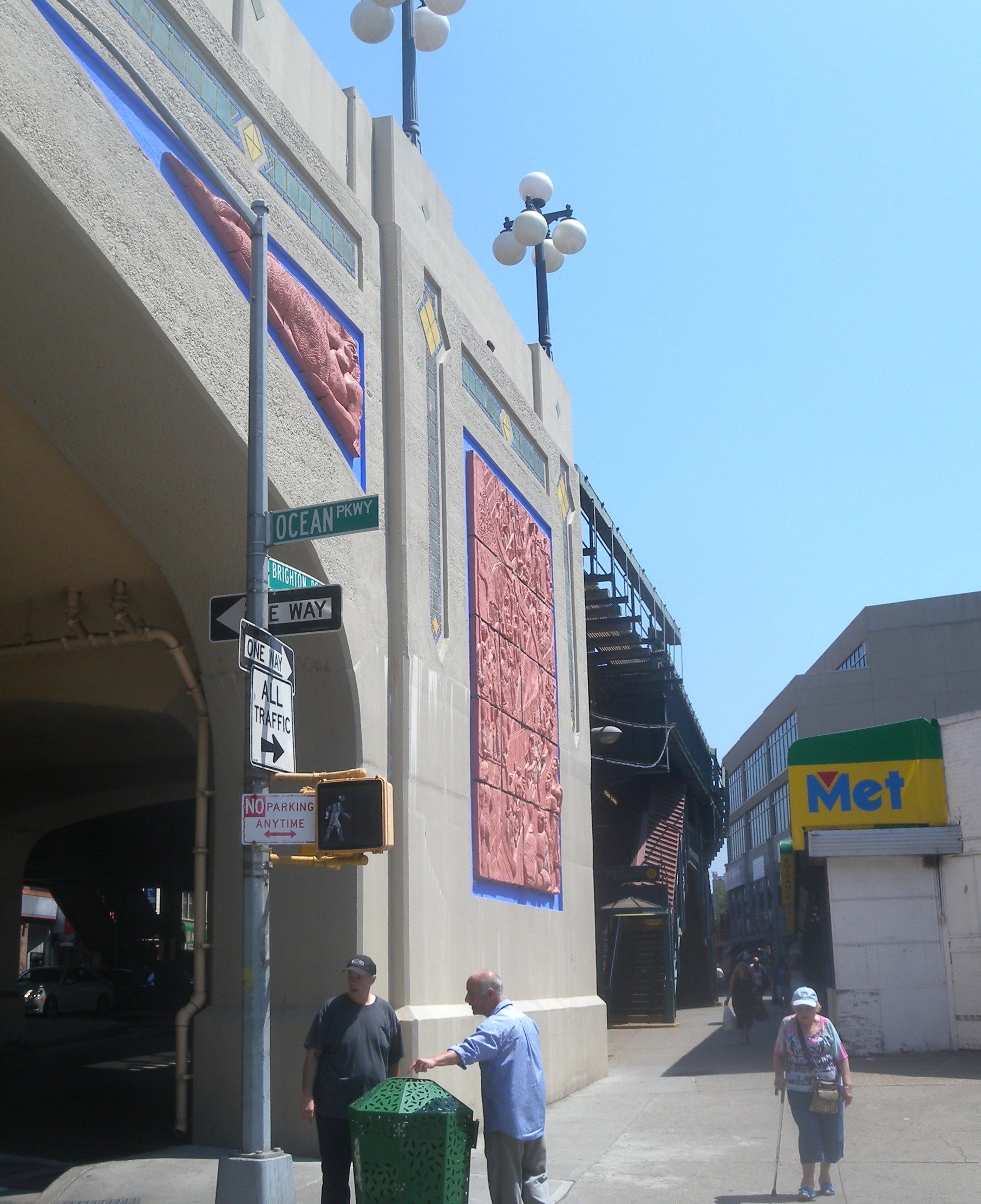
Southern stair

The Ocean Parkway station opened on April 22, 1917. It was served only by a single-track shuttle that ran to Brighton Beach, which was the southern terminal for all trains on the Brighton Line.

When the West Eighth Street station opened in 1919, all four tracks were extended west to serve that stop, which was a two-level station. The local tracks remained at the same elevation and connected to the lower level (which was also served by the IND Culver Line) while the express tracks rose up and connected to the upper level. As a result, all Brighton Line service was extended to Coney Island–Stillwell Avenue.

A reconfiguration in 1954 resulted in the discontinuation of Brighton Line service on the lower level of West Eighth Street, as well as express service at Ocean Parkway. West of this station, the local tracks merge into the express tracks, which continue to serve the upper level of West Eighth Street. The structures connecting the Brighton Line to the lower level, which the Culver Line continues to serve, remain intact, but are trackless.

In April 1993, the New York State Legislature agreed to give the MTA $9.6 billion for capital improvements. Some of the funds would be used to renovate nearly one hundred New York City Subway stations, including Ocean Parkway. The station was closed in August 2002 in conjunction with the reconstruction of the Coney Island–Stillwell Avenue terminal. Service was restored on May 23, 2004.

== Station layout ==
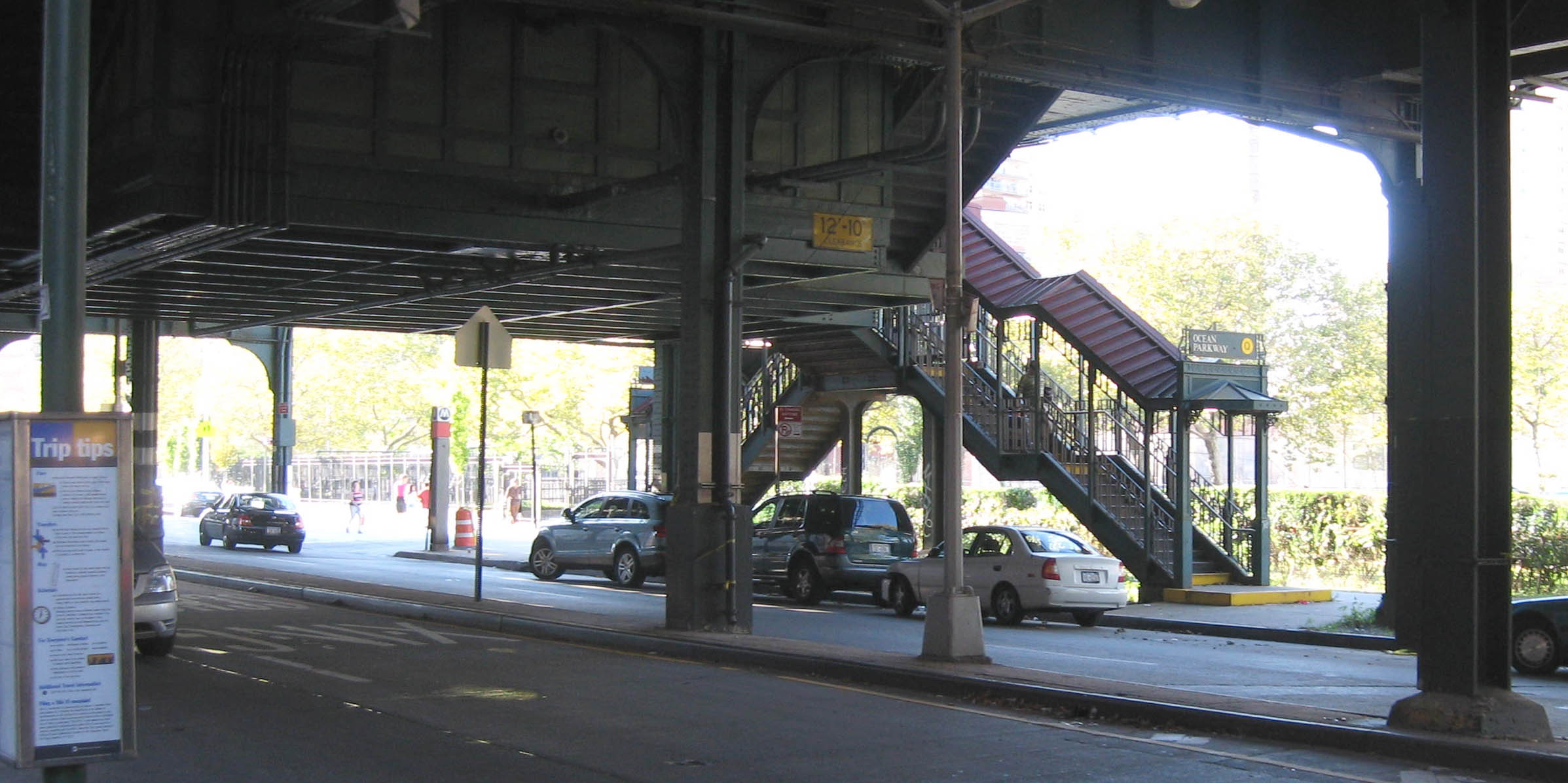
Northern stair

This elevated station has two curved island platforms and four tracks; the center express tracks are not normally used. The station is built on a decorated masonry viaduct to keep with Ocean Parkway's status as a city parkway. The concrete viaduct, designed with elements of the Arts and Crafts, Art Deco, and Streamline Moderne styles, contains molded surfaces with inlaid ceramic tiles. Much of the viaduct has a bush-hammered concrete surface. The northern and southern facades of the viaduct contain projecting vertical piers with brackets and vertical panels. Between the piers on each facade are three arched openings for Ocean Parkway and its service roads; the tops of these arches contain recessed spandrel panels. A frieze with blue and green ceramic tiles runs horizontally under the arches.

Structurally, the masonry viaduct consists of a steel structure encased in wire mesh and surrounded by cast-in-place concrete. The wire mesh was first placed around the steel beams, and the concrete was poured into large timber formwork that was placed atop the wire mesh. Expansion joints were then placed at the bents of the steel structure; this allowed the steel beams to vibrate, expand, and contract while reducing concrete spalling. The station has two mezzanines at its western and eastern ends, directly above Brighton Beach Avenue and below the tracks and platforms. Between the mezzanines is a set of three groin vaults directly above Ocean Parkway. The trackbeds contain a waterproof layer of burlap, coated in coal tar.

Both platforms have red canopies with black frames and T-shaped support columns along their entire length except for a section at their east (railroad north) end. Each canopy consists of a standing-seam metal roof. The undersides of each canopy contain lights and signs. East of the western mezzanine, there is a small electrical substation above the tracks. One staircase from each platform leads down to each mezzanine; the balustrades of these staircases are decorated with friezes and piers, similar to on the exterior of the viaduct.

The 1996 artwork here is called Coney Island Reliefs by Deborah Masters. It was installed in 2009 and consists of 128 reliefs on the station's concrete structure.

Between this station and Brighton Beach, two layup tracks begin at bumper blocks adjacent to the platforms and run between the local and express tracks. The two tracks merge with either adjacent track on approach to Brighton Beach.

=== Exits ===
This station has two sets of entrances and exits, one from each mezzanine. Each mezzanine has windows on all four sides; there are service rooms on the western side of the east mezzanine and on the eastern side of the west mezzanine. Both mezzanines were renovated in the 1990s.

- The full-time mezzanine is at the east end. The western wall of this mezzanine contains one concrete stair to each platform; between the two staircases are service areas, which originally functioned as restrooms. A turnstile bank divides the western and eastern halves of the mezzanine. The center of the mezzanine, beneath the express tracks, contains a low concrete ceiling supported by two square concrete columns; the northern and southern portions, beneath the platforms, contain a high ceiling with steel beams. Outside fare control, within the eastern half of the mezzanine, are a token booth and four staircases, two descending to either eastern corner of Brighton Beach Avenue and Ocean Parkway.
- The other mezzanine at the west end is unstaffed, containing two High Entry/Exit Turnstiles. The southern wall of the mezzanine contains service rooms. It is otherwise arranged roughly as a mirror image of the full-time mezzanine. Outside fare control, within the western half of the mezzanine, two stairs, facing in opposite directions, descend to the northwest corner of Brighton Beach Avenue and Ocean Parkway.

Each of the staircases from the mezzanine to the street contains a similar design. All of the staircases have modern metal balustrades and handrails, as well as cast-iron columns that support standing-seam-metal canopies. At street level, the entrance to each stairway is covered by a cantilevered hexagonal canopy, which has a cornice with bezant motifs. These hexagonal canopies are topped by cornices with wave motifs, above which are ornate signs with the name "Ocean Parkway", scrolled brackets, and spires.

The station is geographically the closest Brighton Line station to the Brighton and Coney Island beaches, with the beachfront located roughly 500 feet (150 m) away from the station.

== Gallery ==
Looking eastward, toward Brighton Beach station

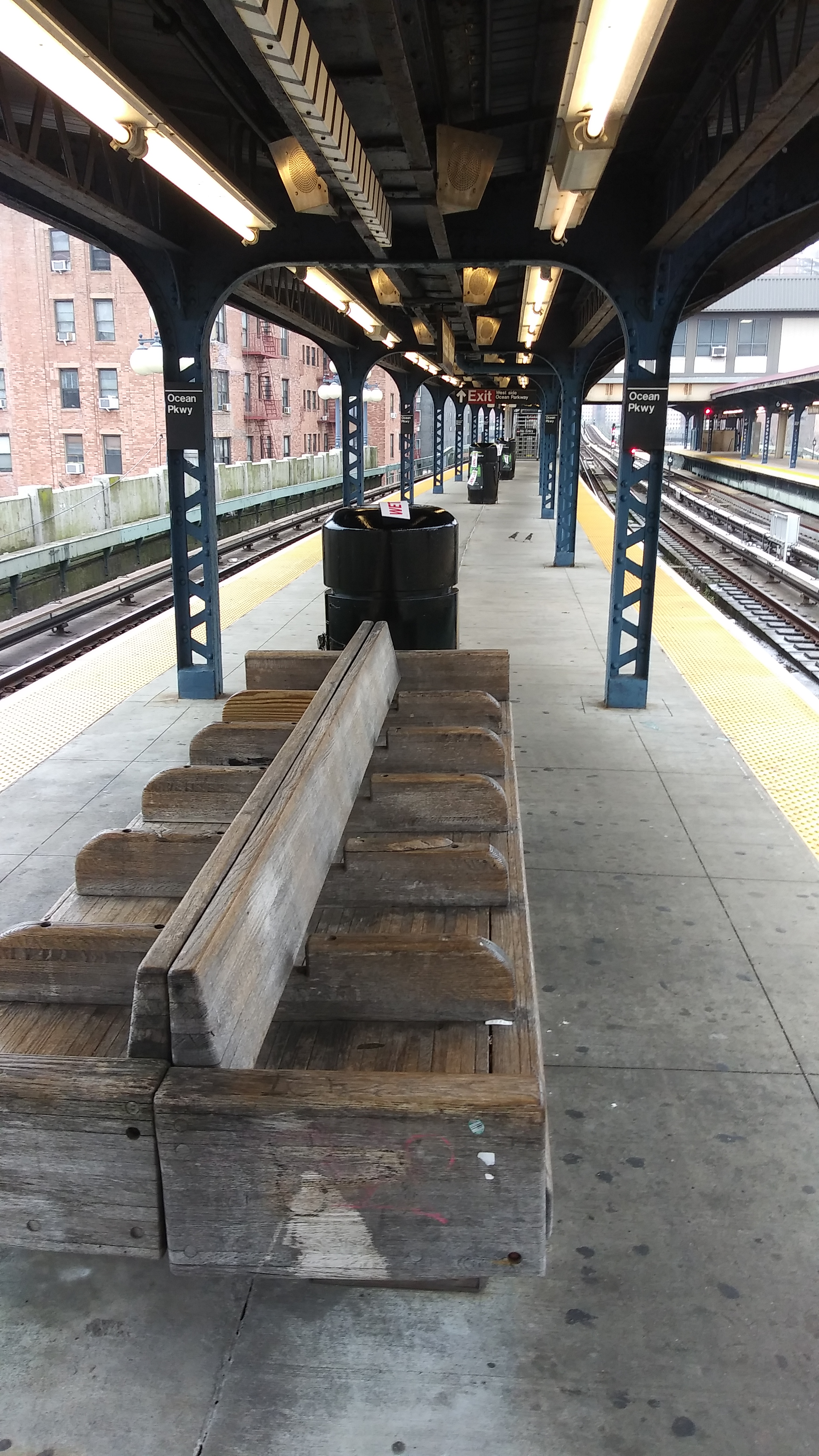
From northbound platform, looking toward Coney Island

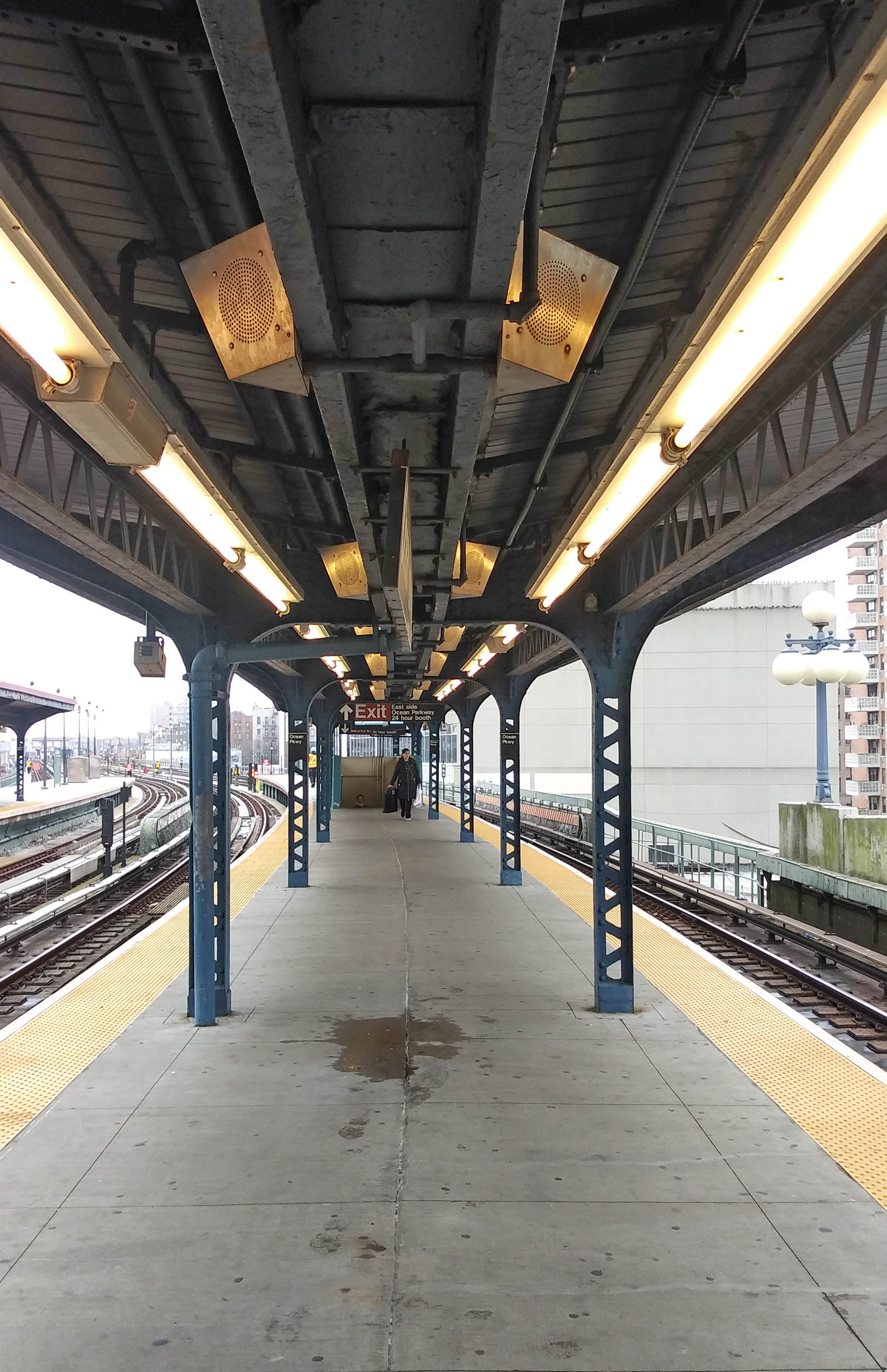
From northbound platform, looking eastward

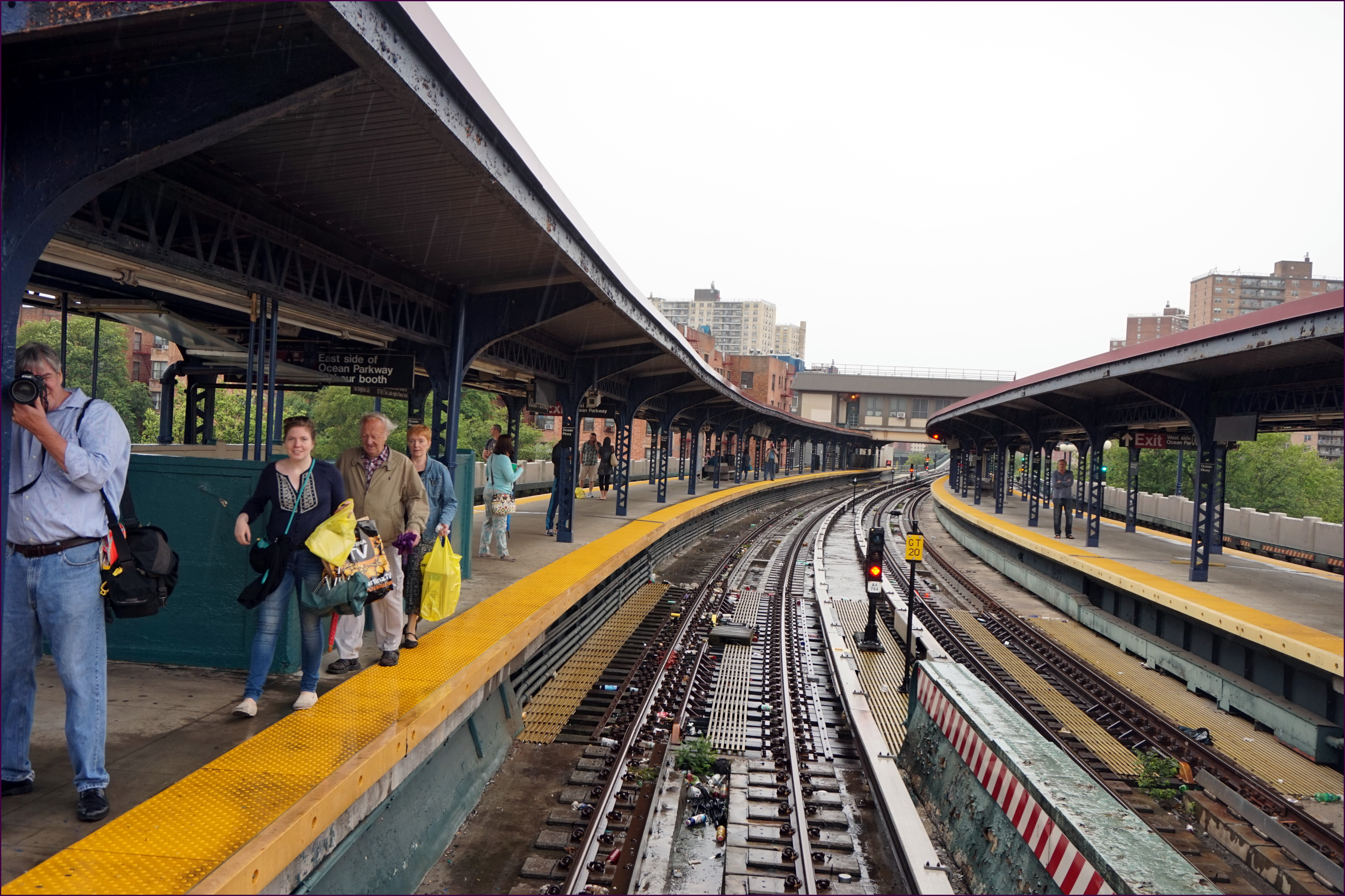
Driver cab's view, made during the Brighton train parade

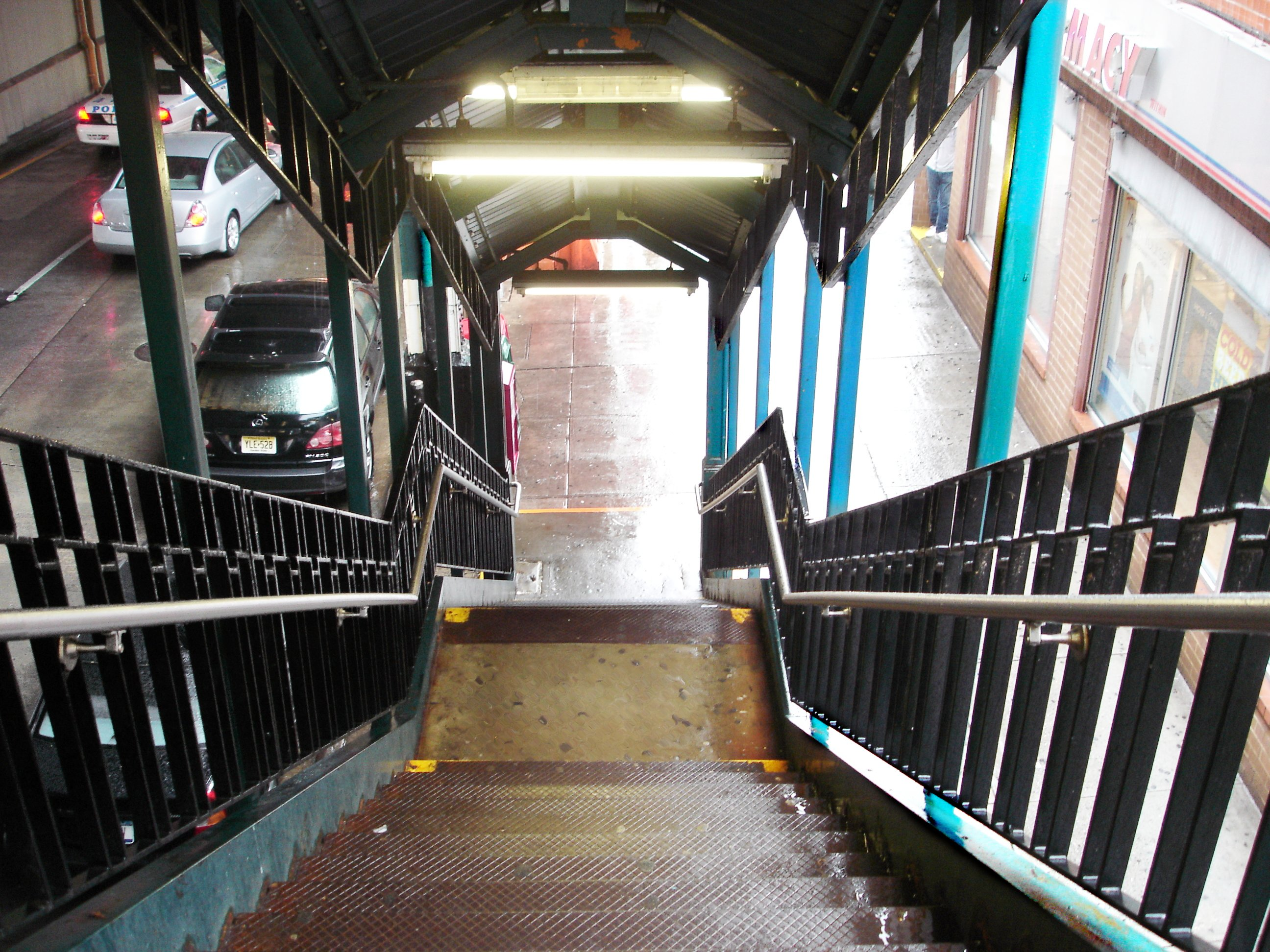
One of the station entrances

== See also ==
- National Register of Historic Places listings in Brooklyn
