= Ocean Parkway (Brooklyn) =

Boulevard in Brooklyn, New York

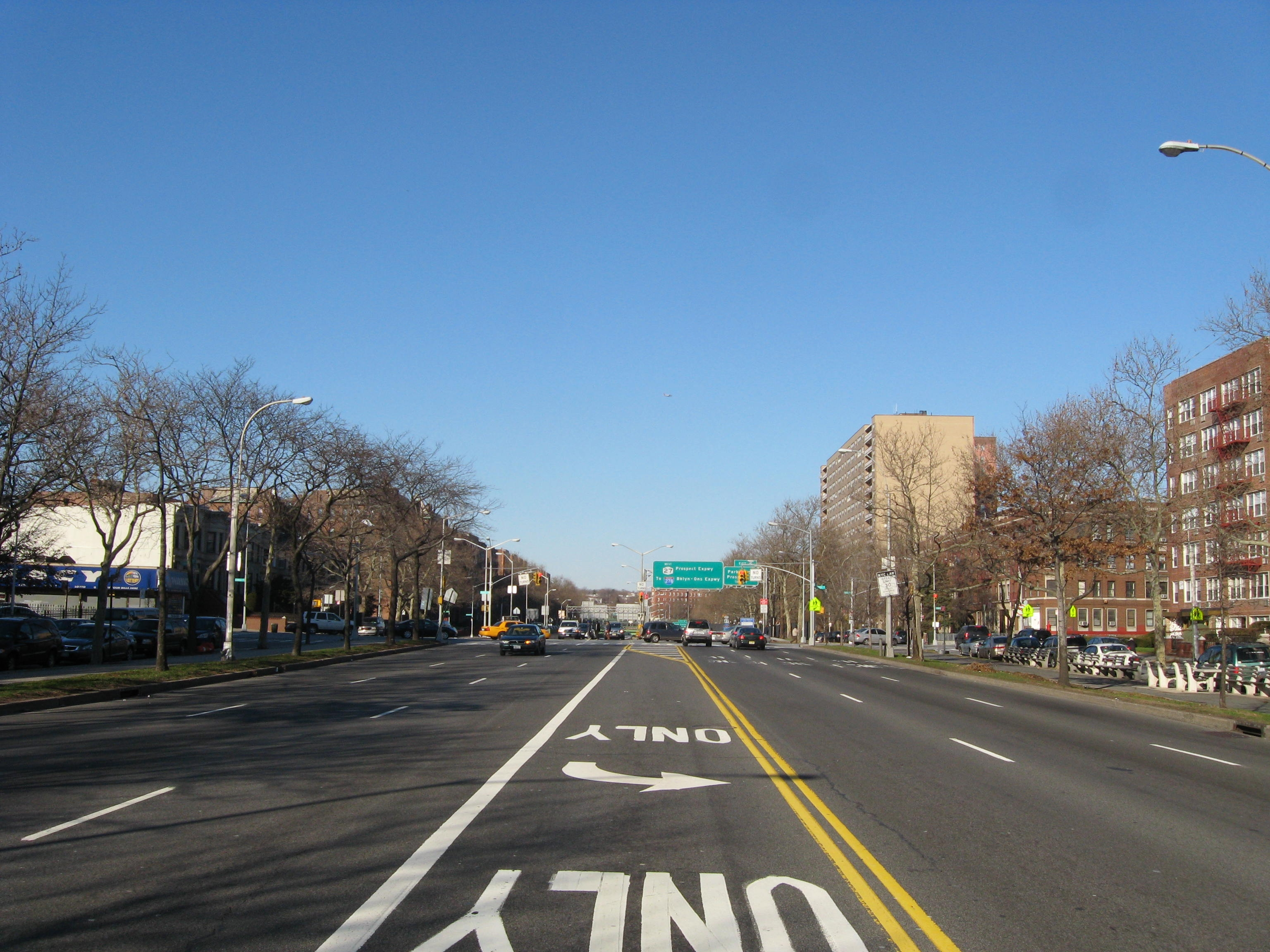
- Ocean Parkway facing north
- Maintained by: New York State Department of Transportation and New York City Department of Transportation
- Length: 5.5 mi (8.9 km)
- Restrictions: No commercial vehicles
- Location: Brooklyn, New York
- South end: Sea Breeze Avenue / Surf Avenue in Brighton Beach
- Major junctions: Belt Parkway in Brighton Beach; NY 27 in Kensington
- North end: Machate Circle in Kensington
- Ocean Parkway
- U.S. National Register of Historic Places
- New York State Register of Historic Places
- New York City Landmark
- Built: 1873–1876
- Architect: Frederick Law Olmsted; Calvert Vaux
- NRHP reference No.: 83001697
- NYCL No.: 0871

Significant dates
- Added to NRHP: September 8, 1983
- Designated NYSRHP: August 4, 1983
- Designated NYCL: January 28, 1975

Ocean Parkway is a boulevard in the New York City borough of Brooklyn. Designed by Frederick Law Olmsted and Calvert Vaux, it was built between 1874 and 1876. Ocean Parkway runs roughly 5.5 miles (8.9 km) north to south from the intersection with Prospect Park (Machate) Circle, at the southwestern corner of Prospect Park, to the Atlantic Ocean waterfront at Brighton Beach. The 4.86-mile-long (7.82 km) section between Church Avenue and the Atlantic Ocean is maintained by the New York State Department of Transportation (NYSDOT) as New York State Route 908H (NY 908H), an unsigned reference route.

In general, Ocean Parkway is 210 feet (64 m) wide and consists of a main roadway, two landscaped medians, and two service roads flanking the main road. The western median contains the United States' first bike lane, which opened in 1894, while the eastern side of the parkway contained a bridle path until the 1970s. Commercial vehicles are prohibited from Ocean Parkway, and there is limited public transit. Much of the original parkway remains intact, but the section north of Church Avenue was mostly replaced with the Prospect Expressway in the 1950s; the service roads continue to Park Circle, the original northern terminus. The section south of Church Avenue is a New York City scenic landmark and on the National Register of Historic Places.

Olmsted and Vaux designed Ocean Parkway, along with Eastern Parkway, in the 1860s to connect Prospect Park with neighborhoods further afield. The section north of Kings Highway was constructed from 1873 to 1874, while the section south of Kings Highway was constructed in 1876. Over the years, a variety of building styles including single-family homes, mansions, and apartment buildings were developed along the parkway. Ocean Parkway was originally a dirt road but has been modified several times over the years. The boulevard first received a macadam pavement in the 1920s and was renovated in the 1970s. Ocean Parkway was one of Brooklyn's most dangerous roads by the 21st century.

== Route description ==
Ocean Parkway is a boulevard within the New York City borough of Brooklyn, which is coextensive with Kings County in western Long Island, New York. It runs 5.5 miles (8.9 km) from Prospect Park in the north to Brighton Beach and Coney Island in the south. Though Ocean Parkway is almost entirely a surface street, the New York State Department of Transportation (NYSDOT) maintains the segment south of Church Avenue as a state highway and oversees the design of the parkway's intersections. The New York City Department of Transportation (NYCDOT) is responsible for the maintenance of traffic lights and crosswalks there. The NYSDOT designates the 4.86-mile (7.82 km) section south of Church Avenue as an unsigned reference route, New York State Route 908H (NY 908H).

Ocean Parkway begins at Prospect Park (Machate) Circle at the southwestern entrance of Prospect Park, where it intersects with Coney Island Avenue and Fort Hamilton Parkway. At Park Circle, the parkway is divided into four roadways. The outermost roadways are service roads; the inner westbound roadway carries traffic to Ocean Parkway and Fort Hamilton Parkway, and the inner eastbound roadway carries traffic from the Prospect Expressway (New York State Route 27). Ocean Parkway travels west for about 1,000 feet (300 m) before curving southward. There is a pedestrian overpass over the parkway at Sherman Street, just east of this curve. West of the overpass, ramps from Ocean Parkway merge into the Prospect Expressway, which runs in a trench. Due to the presence of the expressway, the western or southbound service road is split into two sections between Prospect Avenue and Fort Hamilton Parkway, while the eastern or northbound service road remains intact.

At Church Avenue, a streetcar tunnel crossed under Ocean Parkway from the 1890s to the 1950s. After Prospect Expressway ends at Church Avenue, Ocean Parkway passes through the neighborhoods of Windsor Terrace, Kensington, Midwood, Homecrest, and Sheepshead Bay. The parkway crosses over the Long Island Rail Road's Bay Ridge Branch in Midwood, and it passes underneath the Belt Parkway in Sheepshead Bay. It runs parallel to Ocean Avenue for much of its route. Ocean Parkway ends at Surf Avenue in Brighton Beach, close to the Riegelmann Boardwalk and Atlantic Ocean. Near its southern end, the parkway divides Brighton Beach to the east and Coney Island to the west.

=== Design ===
The landscape firm of Frederick Law Olmsted and Calvert Vaux designed the parkway, while John Y. Culyer was the chief engineer. Olmsted's landscape design firm, the Olmsted Brothers, regarded Ocean Parkway as a "formal pleasure drive" and thus a boulevard; this contrasted with parkways, which the firm defined as "informal pleasure drives". A New York Times article from 1980 characterized Ocean Parkway as "New York City's closest equivalent to a strictly residential boulevard in the European style". According to the historian Elizabeth Macdonald, Ocean Parkway was intended to be a recreational space, as opposed to traditional spaces, which were meant for reflection.

The parkway is similar to Eastern Parkway in its layout. It includes a 70-foot-wide (21 m) central roadway, two 20-foot-wide (6.1 m) grassy medians on each side with bike and pedestrian paths, two 25-foot-wide (7.6 m) service roads on the periphery, and two 15-foot-wide (4.6 m) exterior sidewalks, for a total width of 210 feet (64 m). As designed, there were six rows of trees: two on each median and one on each outer sidewalk. The Brooklyn Parks Commission initially controlled another 30 feet (9.1 m) outside either outer sidewalk, and all buildings on either side of the parkway had to be recessed 30 feet from the sidewalk. The neighborhood's zoning still requires that buildings have a 30-foot-deep lawn.

The parkway's roads were originally paved with gravel and had stone curbs and gutters. By the late 20th century, the roadbeds and sidewalks had been rebuilt in concrete. At intervals of every 0.5 miles (800 m), there were formerly engraved milestones. Only one of the original 11 milestones remains: the 3-mile marker between Quentin Road and Avenue P. There are also traffic signs along the main roadway, which indicate whether drivers must exit onto a service road if they want to make a turn.

==== Medians ====
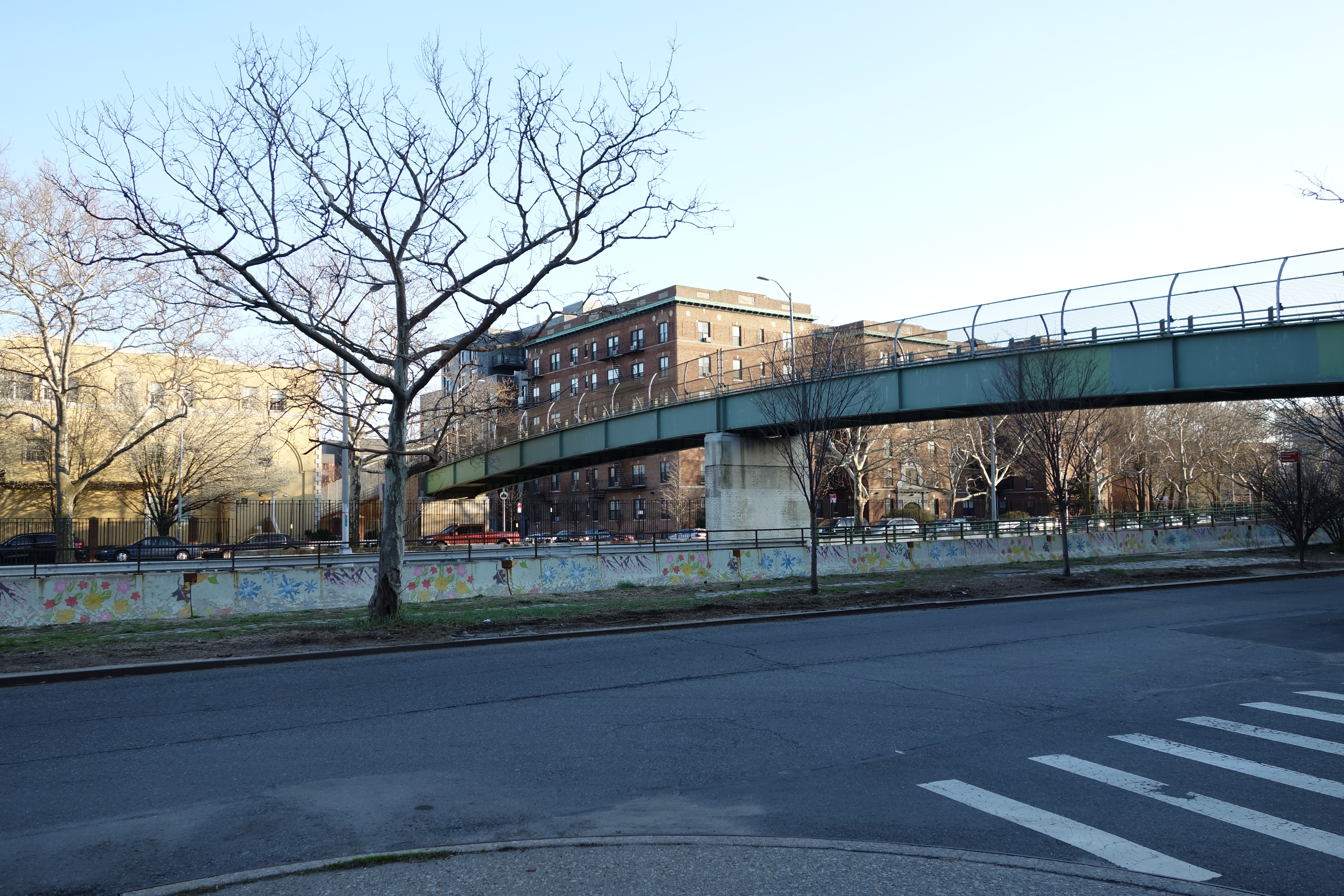
The parkway as seen from Sherman Street

As part of the 1869 legislation that established the parkway, the medians were to be used for trees, plazas, and other ornamentation. As such, chess playing tables and benches line the medians. There are also elm, oak, maple, and sycamore trees along the medians and outer sidewalks, interspersed with some ginkgo trees. Residents along the parkway have used the medians as gathering spaces. North of Church Avenue, the western median has been severed by the Prospect Expressway, while the eastern median has been replaced with pavement.

A bike lane extends along the parkway's length. The bike lane uses the western median south of Church Avenue; north of that intersection, there is a bike path next to the eastern service road. When the western median's bike path opened in 1895, it was paved with crushed stone. At each intersection, a macadam crosswalk was provided for cyclists, and bollards were also installed to discourage horse-drawn vehicles. Another path opened in the eastern median in 1896. During the bike paths' heyday, there were roadhouses and repair shops along Ocean Parkway. The original bike path was repaved with concrete by the 20th century. A pipe-rail fence was added next to the bike lane as part of a renovation in the late 1970s. By the 2000s, the western median south of Beverley Road was divided into a 9.67-foot-wide (2.95 m) bike path and a 5.83-foot-wide (1.78 m) pedestrian path. North of Beverley Road, pedestrians and cyclists share the median, which narrows to 11.5 feet (3.5 m) at Church Avenue. Cycling is not allowed on the east mall south of Church Avenue, which has a walkway measuring 10.25 feet (3.12 m) wide.

A bridle path formerly existed within the eastern mall; it was paved in cinder and clay. Equestrians could rent horses near Prospect Park and ride them as far as Coney Island. There were also horse stables near the northern end of the parkway in Kensington. Both the Gravesend Race Track and Brighton Beach Race Course were adjacent to Ocean Parkway, and horse racing took place there as well. A ban on open betting took effect in either 1908 or 1910, and horse races stopped at all of these facilities. Horseback riding in Brooklyn declined during the 20th century as people switched to automobiles, and equestrian activities became more of a hobby. After the parkway's northern section was replaced by the Prospect Expressway, the remainder of the bridle path was severed from Prospect Park, and equestrian traffic disappeared almost entirely. The bridle path was largely removed in 1978, but a short section of bridle path still exists east of East 8th Street, where the eastern median's bike path ends. The nearby Kensington Stables also remain in operation.

==== Southern end ====
At the southern end, facing the Atlantic Ocean, there was originally a concourse, which traveled around 0.5 miles (0.80 km) along Coney Island Beach. The concourse extended 1,400 feet (430 m) west to the Prospect Park and Coney Island Railroad terminal and 1,400 feet east to Engleman's Oceanic House. As built, it included a roadway measuring 75 feet (23 m) wide and a walkway 25 feet (7.6 m) wide, with a breakwater sloping down to the ocean. The concourse also had two large bathing shelters, which were cited as measuring 75 by 25 feet (22.9 by 7.6 m) wide. By 1922, the Riegelmann Boardwalk had been built at Ocean Parkway's southern terminus.

=== Traffic and safety ===
Commercial vehicles are not allowed to use Ocean Parkway. By the late 1990s, the parkway was used by 42,040 vehicles a day, traveling at an average speed of 35 miles per hour (56 km/h). Since 2015, the parkway has had a speed limit of 25 miles per hour (40 km/h).

By the late 20th century, Ocean Parkway was one of Brooklyn's most dangerous streets. Between 1988 and April 1994, thirty-one people had been killed in vehicular incidents on the parkway, more than any other street in the city except for Grand Concourse and Queens Boulevard. Another report, in 2001, found that drivers had killed 13 pedestrians on the parkway between 1995 and 2000, an average of 2.6 deaths per mile (4.2 deaths per kilometer). By the 2010s, the advocacy group Transportation Alternatives had ranked Ocean Parkway as Brooklyn's most dangerous road. According to the group, six pedestrians had been killed on the parkway from 2009 to 2011. Overall, 64 people were injured or killed on the parkway from 2009 to 2013. The intersection with Church Avenue was among the city's most dangerous, and five people had been killed there from 2007 to 2011. Because of the high number of traffic incidents on Ocean Parkway, the parkway is designated as a Vision Zero traffic safety "priority corridor". After traffic speed cameras were added in 2015, vehicular crashes on the parkway decreased by 16%, while pedestrian injuries were reduced by 23%.

In the parkway's early years, horse-and-sleigh racing took place on the bridle paths. Horse-and-sleigh races often originated in Prospect Park and ended at the Atlantic Ocean. During the late 19th and early 20th centuries, the parkway was sometimes used for races and events. These included horse races organized by the Parkway Driving Club, races along the parkway's central roadway, and vehicular excursions organized by the Long Island Automobile Club. It was also part of the route of the Brooklyn Marathon until the marathon was canceled in 1915. By the 21st century, the Brooklyn Half Marathon also used the parkway for part of its route.

=== Transportation ===
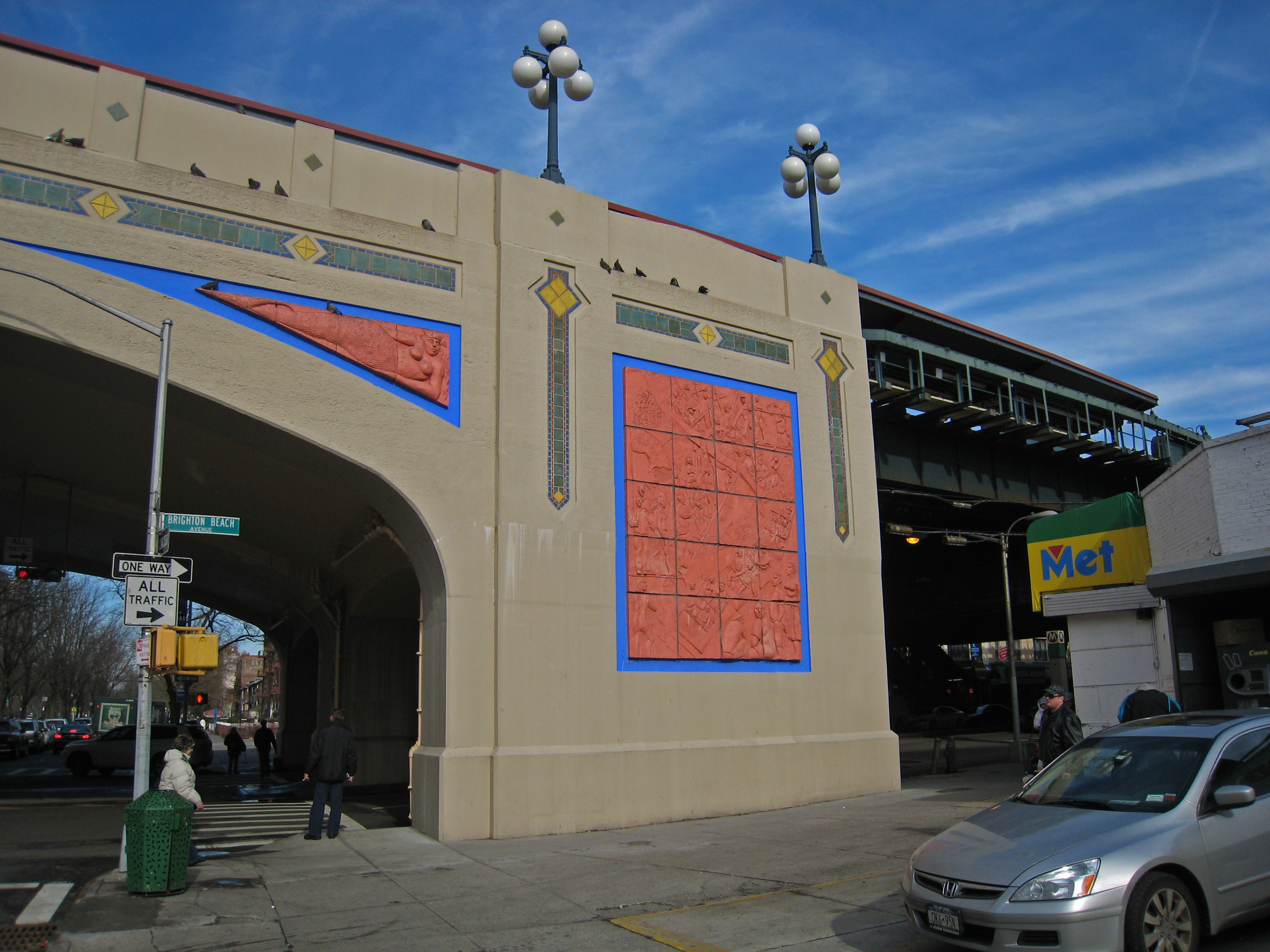
The Ocean Parkway subway station

The Ocean Parkway station of the New York City Subway's BMT Brighton Line, served by the Q train, is located in Brighton Beach. The Ocean Parkway station is situated on a masonry viaduct, with three groin vaults spanning the parkway and colorful ceramic tiles on its facades. During the construction of the Independent Subway System in the 1920s, local groups also advocated for the construction of a subway line under Ocean Parkway, which was not built.

Ocean Parkway is also served by several MTA Regional Bus Operations routes. In Sheepshead Bay, the B1 bus runs on the parkway between Brighton Beach Avenue and Avenue X. It is joined by the B4 and B36 buses between Neptune Avenue and Avenue Z. In Midwood, the B9 bus runs between Avenue M and Avenue N. There were unsuccessful proposals in the 1940s for a bus route extending the parkway's length.

== History ==
=== Development ===
==== Planning ====
Frederick Law Olmsted and Calvert Vaux, who were also responsible for designing Central Park and Prospect Park, suggested the construction of Eastern Parkway and Ocean Parkway to Brooklyn park commissioners in reports prepared in 1866. The proposed Ocean and Eastern parkways would connect Prospect Park with Coney Island and East New York, respectively. Their plan for the parkways were inspired by boulevards such as Unter den Linden in Berlin and Avenue Foch in Paris. However, Ocean and Eastern Parkways were considered to be improvements over these two thoroughfares, since both would contain service roads separated from the main road by tree-lined medians. The National Park Service cites Ocean Parkway as the first parkway to be planned in the U.S., though Eastern Parkway was the first parkway to be constructed. Olmsted and Vaux intended the parkways to be the center of a parkway system in Brooklyn. Though this plan did not come to fruition, it spurred plans for other park and parkway systems in the United States.

The road to Coney Island was officially called Ocean Parkway, although it was initially more commonly known as Coney Island Boulevard. Vaux and Olmsted wrote in 1866 that they wanted the parkway to be "of a picturesque character [...] neither very straight nor very level, and should be bordered by a small belt of trees and shrubbery". The next year, the landscape architects wrote that the parkway would provide a "suggestion of the old country flavor" to people living along the parkway. On May 11, 1869, the New York State Legislature authorized the then-independent city of Brooklyn (Note: Brooklyn became part of the City of Greater New York in 1898.) to develop a highway or avenue from Prospect Park toward Coney Island. The roadway was to extend southwest along Franklin Avenue (now Fort Hamilton Parkway), then turn south toward Coney Island.

The legislation originally called for a 3-mile-long (4.8 km) road measuring 210 feet (64 m) wide. This was composed of a 70-foot (21 m) main road, two 30-foot (9.1 m) medians with trees and grass; two 25-foot (7.6 m) service roads; and two 15-foot (4.6 m) outer sidewalks. Each building on the parkway was required to be recessed at least 30 feet (9.1 m) from the sidewalk. To fund the parkway's construction, a tax assessment was imposed on all properties within 1,050 feet (320 m) of the boulevard. The Brooklyn city government also appointed a group of commissioners to seize property through eminent domain and determine how much to compensate each landowner. The commissioners had finished calculating the compensation by February 1871. A state judge confirmed the commissioners' calculation that December, ruling that landowners be paid $252,788.

The parkway's southern terminus was originally planned to be located at Kings Highway. At the time, the Prospect Park Fair Ground Association (PPFGA) operated a racecourse along the parkway's route, the Gravesend Race Track between Kings Highway and Avenue U. The association had convinced legislators to prevent the parkway's extension through the racetrack. A state legislator proposed amending the original legislation in 1872 to allow the parkway to be extended further south from Kings Highway. The act was amended that year, giving Brooklyn's park commissioners control over the parkway and any courtyards facing it. The park commissioners approved plans for the boulevard's construction that October, and John Lefferts, Teunis G. Bergen, and William W. Moseley were appointed in mid-1872 to oversee Coney Island Boulevard's construction. The state legislature passed a bill in January 1873, officially designating the boulevard as Ocean Parkway. The next month, Brooklyn's Board of Supervisors was directed to auction off all property that lay on the parkway's right of way.

==== Construction ====
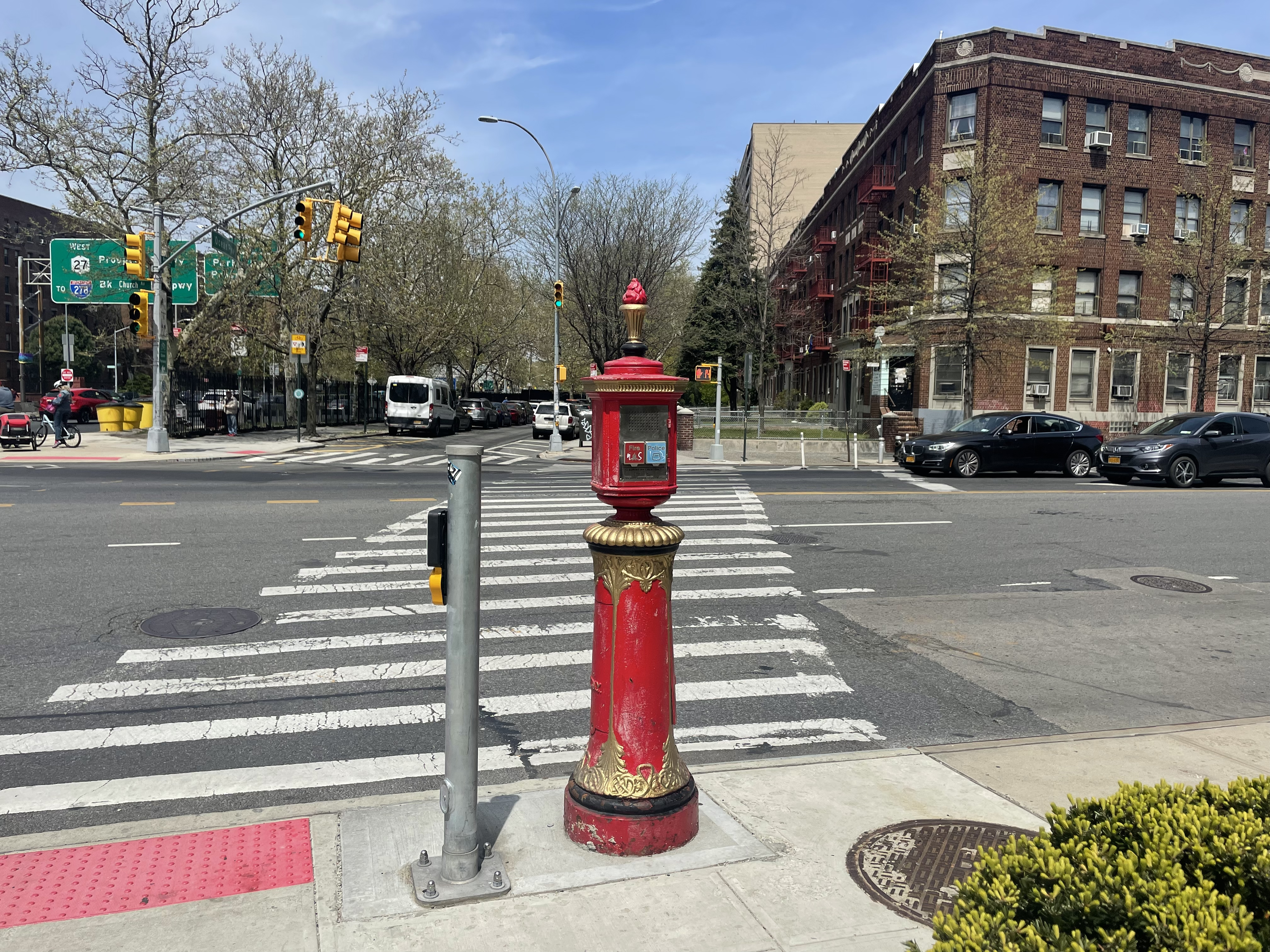
A New York City Fire Department call box at the intersection of Ocean Parkway and Church Avenue

In April 1873, the Board of Supervisors passed a resolution directing the Kings County treasurer to issue up to $300,000 in bonds for the construction of Ocean Parkway. Thomas McCann received the contract to pave the parkway between Prospect Park and Parkville Avenue, and Scrimshaw Paving Company received the contract to pave the section from Parkville Avenue to Kings Highway. McCann and Cranford also received a contract to grade the route of the parkway from Fort Hamilton Parkway to Kings Highway and lay down a gravel roadbed. Work on the gravel roadbed south of Church Avenue began in June, and the Brooklyn Daily Eagle reported that August that the parkway was already well-used. The Eagle referred to the parkway as "a full equal to the [Eastern] Parkway", while the New-York Tribune regarded the road as "the pride of Long Island" and predicted that it would be one of the United States' finest boulevards when complete. Brooklyn's park commissioners were invited to tour the northern half of the parkway in March 1874, and the parkway was completed that May, except for stone flagging.

Prospect Park's chief engineer, John Y. Culyer, finished surveying the route of the parkway's southern extension in early 1874. Simultaneously, the state legislature passed a bill to extend the parkway southward. Governor John Adams Dix modified the bill so the bonds for the extension could not be issued until the following year. Despite the delays, James S. T. Stranahan, the president of the Brooklyn Board of Park Commissioners, approved the creation of a special tax-assessment district in mid-1874. Property owners in the special district would pay a tax to fund the construction of the southern extension, which was projected to cost $295,525. Originally, the southern half of the parkway was planned to curve around the PPFGA's racetrack. The city of Brooklyn auctioned off 1,000 land lots in the right-of-way of the parkway's extension later that year. Brooklyn's park commissioners voted in November 1874 to adopt Culyer's design for the extension of Ocean Parkway, though there was still no money to begin extending the parkway.

During mid-1875, the city's park commissioners began calculating the values of land for Ocean Parkway's extension, though construction was delayed while Brooklyn's park commissioners negotiated to acquire the PPFGA's racetrack. The racetrack's clubhouse was ultimately relocated west of the parkway. The commissioners also approved a wide promenade at the southern end of the parkway that June. Brooklyn's park commissioners solicited bids for the Ocean Parkway extension in March 1876, and the Brooklyn Supervisors' Law Committee recommended the same month that $200,000 be appropriated for the extension's construction. The supervisors approved the sale of $200,000 in bonds that April. Initially, the Brooklyn city government issued $184,000 in bonds; the city did not issue the remaining $16,000 until the next year. The southern extension of Ocean Parkway to Coney Island was well underway by mid-1876. A large amount of swampland was infilled to make way for the parkway's extension, while a concourse was built at the parkway's southern end, on Coney Island Beach. Contractors also constructed a bridge across Coney Island Creek, which was completed that June.

==== Completion and cost ====
The extension of Ocean Parkway was finished on November 11, 1876, and opened seven days later on November 18. When Ocean Parkway was finished, the area was still relatively rural, with farms on either side of the parkway. The trees along the parkway had not grown to their full sizes, giving the parkway a barren appearance. Initially, Ocean Parkway was frequently used by horse-drawn carriages. Heavy vehicles were banned from using the parkway's main road but were allowed to use the service roads. The parkway was often referred to as "the boulevard" or as "Coney Island Boulevard". The completion of Ocean Parkway contributed to further development in the Kensington neighborhood.

A contemporary Brooklyn Daily Eagle article described the boulevard as the "paradise of horsemen, and by far the finest drive in the country". The Times Union called Ocean Parkway "the finest drive in the world" and predicted that the parkway's presence would turn Coney Island into "the favorable suburban resort of the city" of Brooklyn. The New York Times wrote in 1877 that the parkway was unrivaled "as a work of suburban embellishment". The Kings County Rural Gazette regarded Ocean Parkway as superior to both Penn Avenue in Pittsburgh, Pennsylvania, and Euclid Avenue in Cleveland, Ohio.

At the time of the parkway's completion, the construction costs were estimated at $300,000 (equivalent to $7,942,000 in 2024), the cost of which was to be paid by landowners within 1,050 feet (320 m) of the parkway. Brooklyn's park commission was required to pay for the boulevard's annual upkeep, though the Kings County government controlled the parkway. For several years, there were disputes over who would pay for the parkway. There was a proposal in 1878 to have the city of Brooklyn pay the parkway's cost, but the New York State Legislature voted down the proposal. A similar proposal to divide the cost among all landowners in Brooklyn was put forth in 1879, but the state legislature refused this plan as well. The state legislature ultimately passed a law in 1882, allowing landowners within 800 feet (240 m) of Ocean Parkway to pay one-third of the parkway's cost. The remaining two-thirds would be paid by the Kings County government.

=== Late 19th century ===
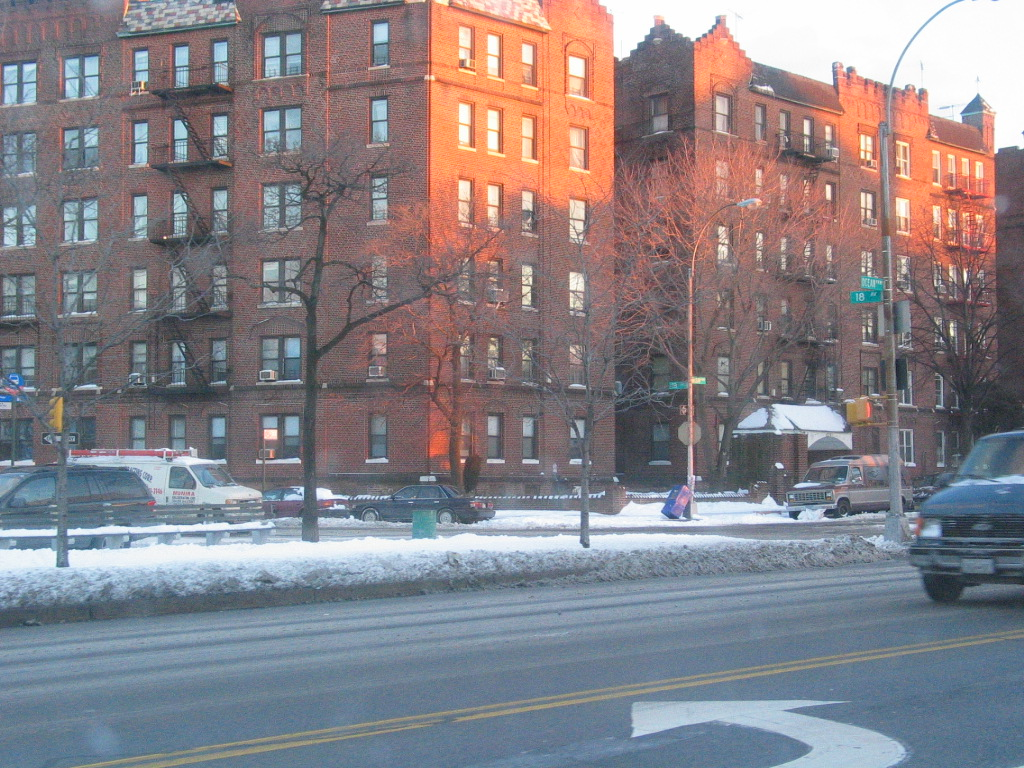
Apartment buildings at Ocean Parkway and 18th Avenue

Shortly after the parkway was completed, Brooklyn's park commissioners voted to allocate funding for water mains under the parkway. The water mains were approximately 30,000 feet (9,100 m) long and supplied water from Prospect Park to neighborhoods further south. To preserve the parkway's appearance, state legislators passed a law in 1881, which banned the construction of steam railroads and streetcar lines with level crossings on Ocean Parkway. The parkway also could not be raised or lowered to make way for railroads. The Ocean Parkway Transit Company proposed constructing a streetcar line along the parkway's eastern service road in 1888, though the plans elicited protests and were not approved. Other companies had similar problems constructing streetcar lines across the parkway. The Nassau Electric Railroad was banned from installing streetcar tracks across the boulevard in the 1890s, even though two streetcar lines had already built tracks across the parkway. In another case, an underpass had to be built under the parkway for the Church Avenue streetcar line; this was the only streetcar tunnel in Brooklyn.

Brooklyn city officials announced plans in 1884 to repave Ocean Parkway with gravel, and the repaving took place the next year. Meanwhile, cyclists often used the parkway's western median to travel to and from Coney Island. By 1892, cyclists were petitioning the Brooklyn government to construct a bike path along Ocean Parkway. There were proposals to convert one of the service roads into a bike path, as well as to construct asphalt or concrete bike paths within the medians. These cyclists formed the Good Roads Association to raise $3,500 to construct the pavements for the bike paths. Following negotiations with the Good Roads Association, the Brooklyn park commissioners agreed to build a bike path within the western median of Ocean Parkway in April 1893, and work began that May. Five short sections of the bike path were paved in experimental materials: four were made of different types of gravel, and the fifth was paved in limestone. After a local cyclists' organization inspected the five test sections in late 1894, the city of Brooklyn decided to construct the rest of the pathway out of crushed gravel. The bike path was formally dedicated on June 15, 1895, with a parade attended by 10,000 cyclists. The bike path was the first to be built in the United States.

Originally, the bike path was 14 feet (4.3 m) wide and had a speed limit of 12 miles per hour (19 km/h). In the two months after the bike path opened, an average of 2,000 people used it each day. Part of the existing bike path was widened in late 1895. Owing to the bike path's popularity, Brooklyn mayor Frederick W. Wurster approved plans for a second bikeway on Ocean Parkway's eastern median in April 1896. Brooklyn's park commissioners began soliciting bids for the second path that month. The park commissioners also ordered cyclists to use the bike path and not the main road, though the decree elicited objections from cyclists. The city of Brooklyn completed the eastern bike path in June 1896. Drinking fountains and benches were added at regular intervals along the medians, and pedestrian shelters were built at the north and south ends of the parkway. To accommodate heavy vehicles, part of the western service road was repaved in macadam in 1896. These were among the last projects completed by the Brooklyn city government before Brooklyn became part of the City of Greater New York in 1898.

The parkway itself remained a dirt road until 1897. Ocean Parkway had never been graded properly, which resulted in large accumulations of rainwater; the drainage problems were exacerbated by the completion of the bike paths. As such, the state legislature provided $50,000 to improve Ocean Parkway during 1897. That April, Brooklyn's park commissioners awarded contracts to pave the main road from Prospect Park to 22nd Avenue (Bay Parkway) in macadam, as well as add concrete gutters along the main road. The same year, the commissioners also awarded a contract to pave the western service road, south of Kings Highway, with macadam. The Good Roads Association alleged that the western roadway was paved poorly, and the Brooklyn Citizen alleged that the contractor for the west road had received the contract due to cronyism. By the late 1890s, the parkway also had electric lights powered by the Flatbush Light Company.

=== 20th century ===
The parkway continued to receive praise in the 20th century. The Brooklyn Citizen wrote in 1902 that the parkway was better than "even the great thoroughfare of Budapest", Andrássy Avenue, while The Brooklyn Daily Eagle wrote that "no more beautiful speeding ground is there in this country". Even in the mid-20th century, the Kings Courier wrote that "many still maintain that the magnificent street, with its lovely trees, walks and benches, still holds first place for beauty". The architectural critic Paul Goldberger wrote in the 1980s that the parkway "is wide, sumptuous and full of trees", although he regarded the parkway as having unassuming, commonplace architecture.

==== 1900s and 1910s ====
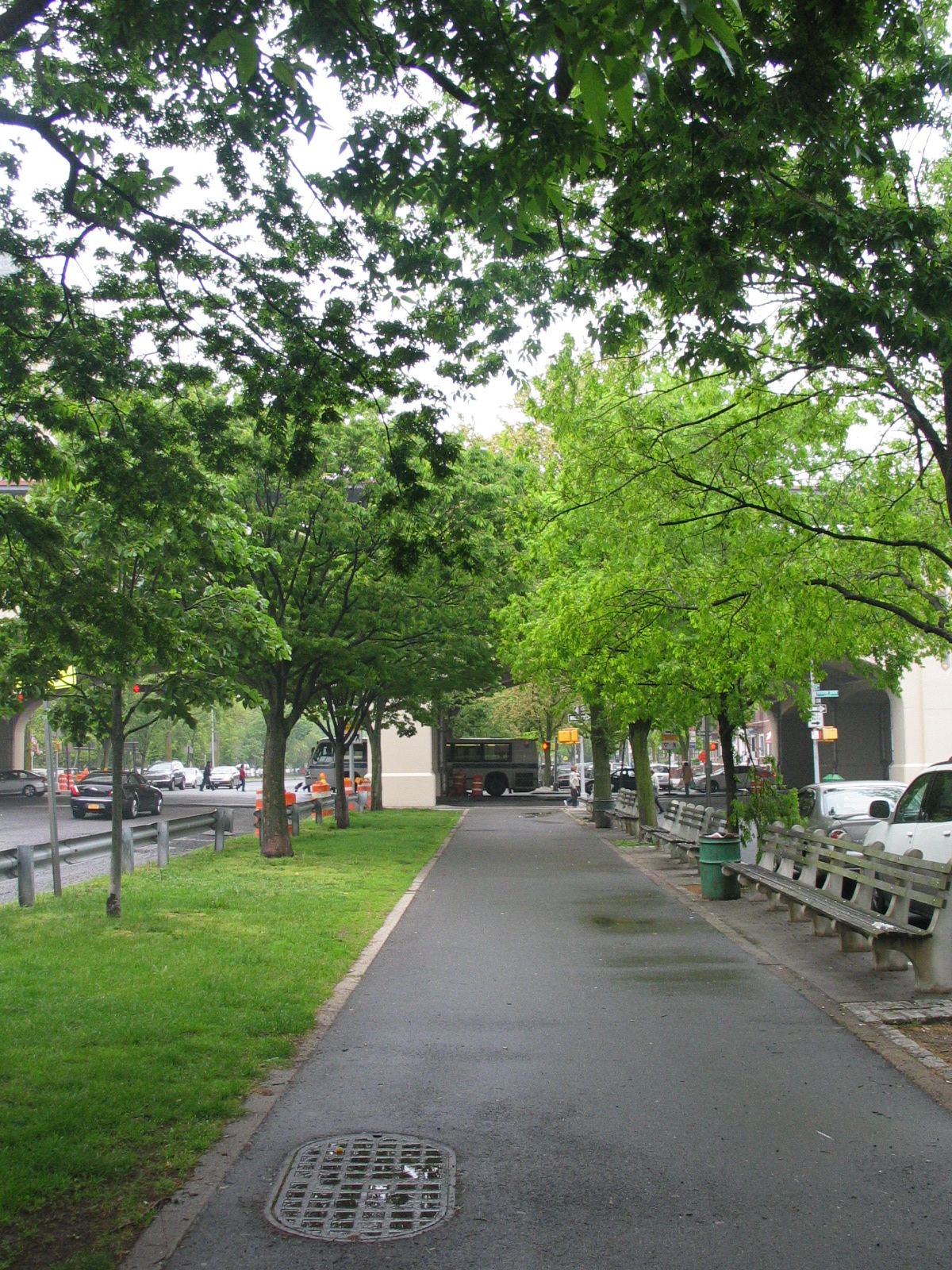
Walking path near the southern end of the parkway

In 1900, Brooklyn borough officials agreed to spend $3,000 to convert the main roadway between 22nd Avenue and Kings Highway into an automobile speedway. The speedway was paved with clay and loam, and the western bike path was also widened to match the 18-foot (5.5 m) width of the eastern bike path. Ocean Parkway's speedway was completed later that year, and automobile drivers were given exclusive use of the speedway during selected hours. Though the clay-and-loam pavement was optimal for racing, it also tended to become muddy after rainstorms. The New-York Tribune wrote that the bridle path was often so overcrowded that horse carriages were forced onto the main roadway. Following requests from equestrians, in early 1903, the New York City Department of Parks and Recreation (NYC Parks) banned all vehicles except horse-drawn vehicles from the eastern service road. The main roadway was reserved for "pleasure vehicles", while commercial vehicles used the western service road. The next year, a sewer was installed under the parkway, and part of the bike lane was ripped up to make way for the sewer.

State legislators drafted a bill in 1910 to give equestrians exclusive use of the Ocean Parkway speedway during selected hours; the bill was passed that May despite opposition from automobile drivers. NYC Parks subsequently banned all automobiles from the speedway. After the Long Island Automobile Club sued to overturn the ban, the New York Court of Appeals revoked the equestrians' right to the exclusive use of the speedway in June 1912. City officials also regraded Ocean Parkway between Neptune and Coney Island avenues, which frequently flooded during high tides, during the early 1910s. By the end of the decade, many of the parkway's trees had died without being replaced, and the pavement was also in poor condition. There were proposals in 1918 to rename Ocean Parkway after the French military general Joseph Joffre, as the parkway was frequently confused with Ocean Avenue. The New York City Board of Aldermen failed to act upon the renaming proposal.

==== 1920s to early 1940s ====
NYC Parks announced plans to repave the entirety of the main and western service roads in asphalt, add new trees, replace the sidewalk, and raise the bicycle and bridle paths in late 1919. The project was part of a $1.5 million program to improve parks and roads across Brooklyn. NYC Parks banned commercial vehicles from using the parkway between Park Circle and Avenue U the next year, citing increasing congestion. NYC Parks hired several companies to repave Ocean Parkway in 1921. and the work was completed the following May, giving the thoroughfare permanent pavement for the first time. As part of the project, the main road was narrowed to 66 feet (20 m) between avenues J and W. In addition, NYC Parks planned to pave the eastern service road and convert the eastern bike path to a bridle path. Park commissioner E. T. O'Loughlin described the existing bridle path on the eastern service road as "an unbearable nuisance and a menace to health" in 1924, and he said the bike paths saw almost no traffic.

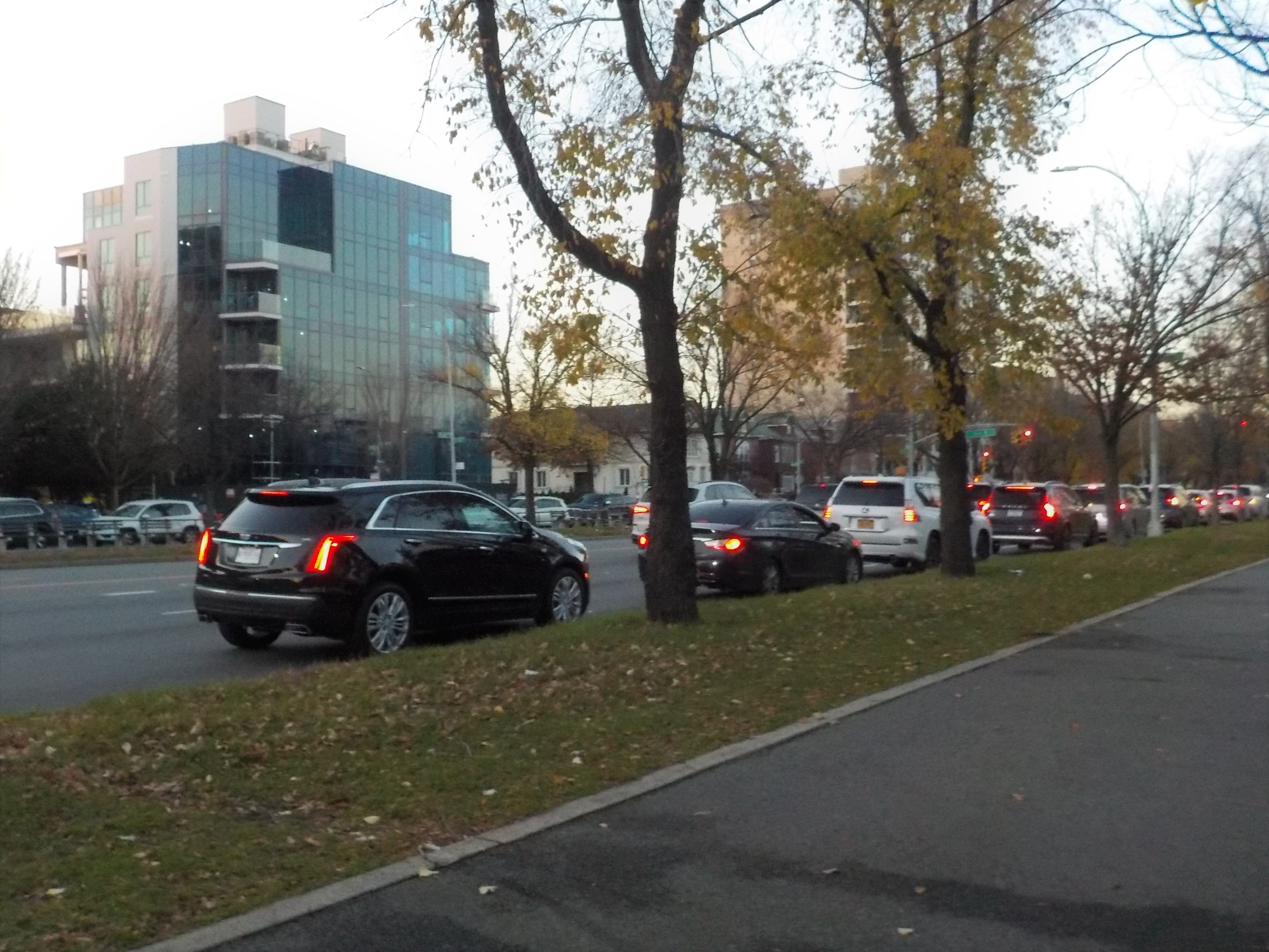
The parkway as seen near Avenue N

Meanwhile, due to worsening congestion, the New York City Police Department (NYPD) began stationing traffic guards at several intersections in the 1920s, and a traffic light was added at Kings Highway. There were also proposals for additional traffic signal towers on Ocean Parkway, as well as traffic islands in the main roadway. Traffic commissioner Grover Whalen proposed constructing a movable bridge in 1924 to replace the existing bridge that carried Ocean Parkway over Coney Island Creek. The new bridge was never built, as Coney Island Creek was partially infilled east of Ocean Parkway in the late 1920s. Workers installed a trunk water main along the parkway in 1927, requiring the partial closure of the bridle path. The next year, NYC Parks announced plans to pave the eastern service road in asphalt, though work was delayed for several months. In addition, timed traffic lights were installed along the parkway. To encourage motorists to drive on the right-hand side of the parkway, the NYPD first painted road markings onto the main roadway in 1929.

The installation of traffic lights on Ocean Parkway contributed to congestion and vehicular crashes on parallel streets, as motorists sought to avoid the parkway's traffic lights. In addition, the intersection of Prospect Avenue, Ocean Parkway, and Fort Hamilton Parkway had become one of the most congested in New York City by 1930. Few equestrians still used Ocean Parkway after all the roadways had been paved. As part of a Works Progress Administration project to expand Brooklyn's bike-lane network, workers replaced Ocean Parkway's bike path with a 10-foot-wide (3.0 m) concrete bikeway between Park Circle and Neptune Avenue. By 1942, traffic at the intersection with Prospect Avenue and Fort Hamilton Parkway prompted the city's traffic engineers to redesign that intersection. As part of this redesign, the northbound (eastern) service road was reserved for traffic traveling to the Gowanus Parkway (later Gowanus Expressway).

==== Mid-1940s to 1960s ====
Additional traffic markings were painted onto Ocean Parkway's roadways between Park Circle and Surf Avenue in 1950. City officials announced plans in 1952 to increase speed limits to 35 miles per hour (56 km/h) and retime the parkway's traffic signals, though these plans were not implemented for several years. City officials also sought to increase traffic flow by banning vehicles from parking on Ocean Parkway during rush hours. In addition, engineers investigated the possibility of relocating Ocean Parkway's traffic lights in 1955 after receiving complaints that the existing traffic signals, in the middle of the roadway, were hazardous.

Many of the parkway's intersections were redesigned between 1960 and 1961. Workers added left-turn lanes, retimed traffic signals, and replaced the existing traffic lights in the middle of the roadway with signals suspended from mast arms. In addition, some of the medians were extended to reduce collisions between drivers in the main road and service roads. Although the traffic signals only controlled traffic on the main roadway and not the service roads, many motorists on the service roads were fined for not obeying the traffic signals. In advance of the 1964 New York World's Fair, workers also planted new trees along Ocean Parkway. Traffic commissioner Henry Barnes added parking spaces to the service roads, and he removed parking spaces near intersections to improve visibility.

As early as the 1940s, urban planner Robert Moses had suggested constructing an expressway to connect Ocean and Gowanus parkways. Despite local opposition to the proposal, Moses announced plans in 1945 for the Prospect Expressway, which would link the two parkways. The plans initially called for the expressway to pass over Fort Hamilton Parkway and under Caton Avenue before terminating at the intersection of Beverley Road and Ocean Parkway. The Prospect Expressway was completed in 1962, replacing the section of Ocean Parkway north of Church Avenue. The expressway's construction severed Ocean Parkway's bike path from the roads in Prospect Park. By the late 1960s, equestrian traffic had declined to almost nothing. As such, NYC Parks began removing the bridle path between Church and Foster avenues in 1967, saying that the path was a traffic hazard.

==== 1970s renovation ====
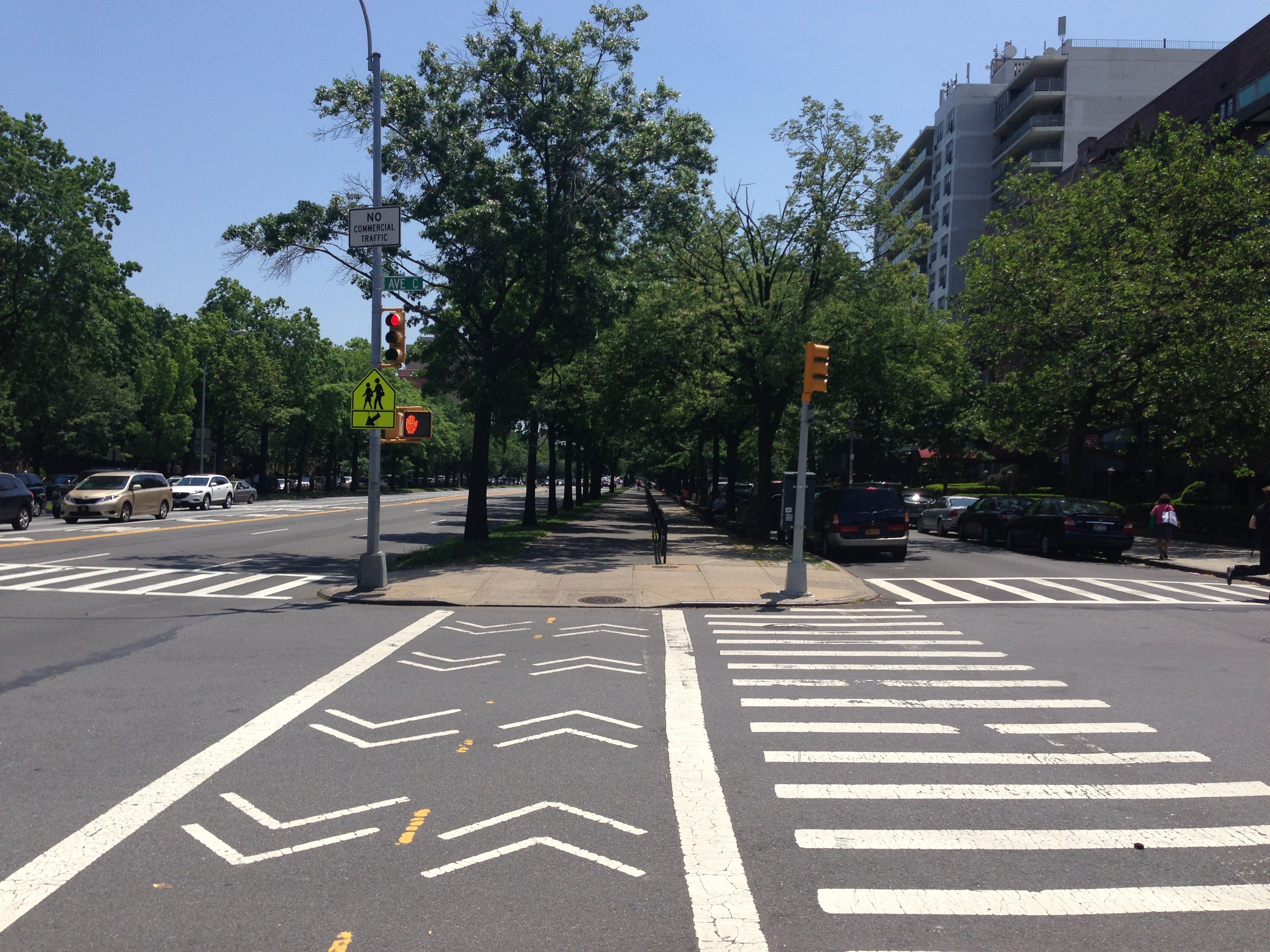
The western median as seen from Avenue C

By the early 1970s, there were many potholes along Ocean Parkway. The city government attempted to repave the entire parkway at a cost of $6.5 million in 1971. Seven-tenths of the project was to be funded by the federal government, while the state government would pay for the rest. The next year, the city's transportation administrator requested funds for the repaving of Ocean Parkway from Kings Highway to Church Avenue. The federal government would only pay for the repaving project if the lanes were widened; this would have entailed removing trees and adding Jersey barriers. Residents objected to the removal of trees, and they also opposed leaving the parkway as-is, but they did support the installation of new curbs. Additionally, there were proposals to install left-turn signals along the parkway to improve vehicular safety.

The New York City Landmarks Preservation Commission (LPC) proposed designating Ocean Parkway as a scenic landmark in late 1974. The LPC had gained the authority to designate city parkland as scenic landmarks the preceding year. At the time, local residents worried that the parkway's medians would be modified or destroyed, and there were concerns that the barriers would encourage speeding. Brooklyn borough president Sebastian Leone, who opposed the Jersey barriers, said he would reject federal funding for the boulevard if the federal government required the barriers to be installed. The LPC designated the parkway as a landmark on January 28, 1975. After a short controversy over whether such a landmark was eligible for federal funds, the Federal Highway Administration (FHA) said the landmark designation would not affect the parkway's federal funding. The New York City Board of Estimate confirmed the parkway's scenic landmark status in April 1975. Afterward, the New York state government announced that Ocean Parkway was to be restored and repaved.

The FHA approved plans for Ocean Parkway's reconstruction in March 1976, and officials announced that August that the state and U.S. governments would pay for the entire project. Work commenced on September 20, 1976. The first phase of the project, covering 1.5 miles (2.4 km), included rebuilding the western median's bike path. The project also included new drainage systems, curbs, concrete roadbeds, and pavement. The city's Department of Highway planned to add benches, game tables, fences, stone-block pavers around trees, and wheelchair ramps in response to local residents' requests. The overpass above the Bay Ridge Branch, between avenues H and I, would be replaced. In addition, the parkway's bridle path was removed, and 598 trees were to be planted. During the renovation, local residents complained of unsafe work conditions; for instance, one pedestrian died after being hit by a crane. The state and U.S. governments allocated another $5.2 million to the project in November 1978, and the reconstruction was completed in 1980.

Meanwhile, the construction of institutional buildings in the 1970s prompted local residents to ask that the Ocean Parkway corridor be rezoned to preserve the area's residences. The area, which was originally proposed to cover only the area between Church Avenue and Avenue P, was subsequently expanded to include the area between Park Circle and Brighton Beach Avenue. The New York City Planning Commission voted in December 1976 to rezone the corridor, and the New York City Board of Estimate approved the rezoning the next month. The city government then created the Special Ocean Parkway District.

==== 1980s and 1990s ====
The New York City Department of Transportation (NYCDOT) relaxed parking regulations on Ocean Parkway in 1980 to allow Orthodox Jewish residents to park on the service roads during Shabbat, when Orthodox Jews were forbidden to use their cars. In addition, the NYCDOT added loading areas along the service roads. Ocean Parkway was added to the National Register of Historic Places on September 8, 1983. The parkway was included in the 1987 plan for the Brooklyn–Queens Greenway, a pedestrian and bicycle path stretching 40 miles (64 km) across Brooklyn and Queens. The greenway proposal was to connect Ocean Parkway, Prospect Park, and Eastern Parkway with other destinations in the two boroughs. The section of the bike path from Beverley Road to Church Avenue was reopened the next year as part of the construction of the Brooklyn–Queens Greenway. The reopened bike path included new signage and a pedestrian walkway next to it.

In the 1990s, the pine trees were replaced with local flora such as American holly and red cedar trees. By then, the parkway's bike lane had become rundown, and few local residents even knew of its existence because of a lack of signage. Ocean Parkway had also become one of the city's most dangerous thoroughfares, and motorists routinely traveled above the speed limit of 30 miles per hour (48 km/h). Following a series of deadly vehicular crashes on Ocean Parkway, local residents began advocating for the NYCDOT to install left turn signals along the parkway; according to Brooklyn Community Board 14's district manager, the signals would cost $1.5 million. Signals were installed at avenues J and P in 1993, and the NYCDOT approved additional signals at 18th Avenue and Avenue I the next year. Additionally, in 1997, the NYCDOT proposed connecting the bike paths along Ocean and Belt parkways as part of a $200,000 program to create bikeways around the city.

=== 21st century ===
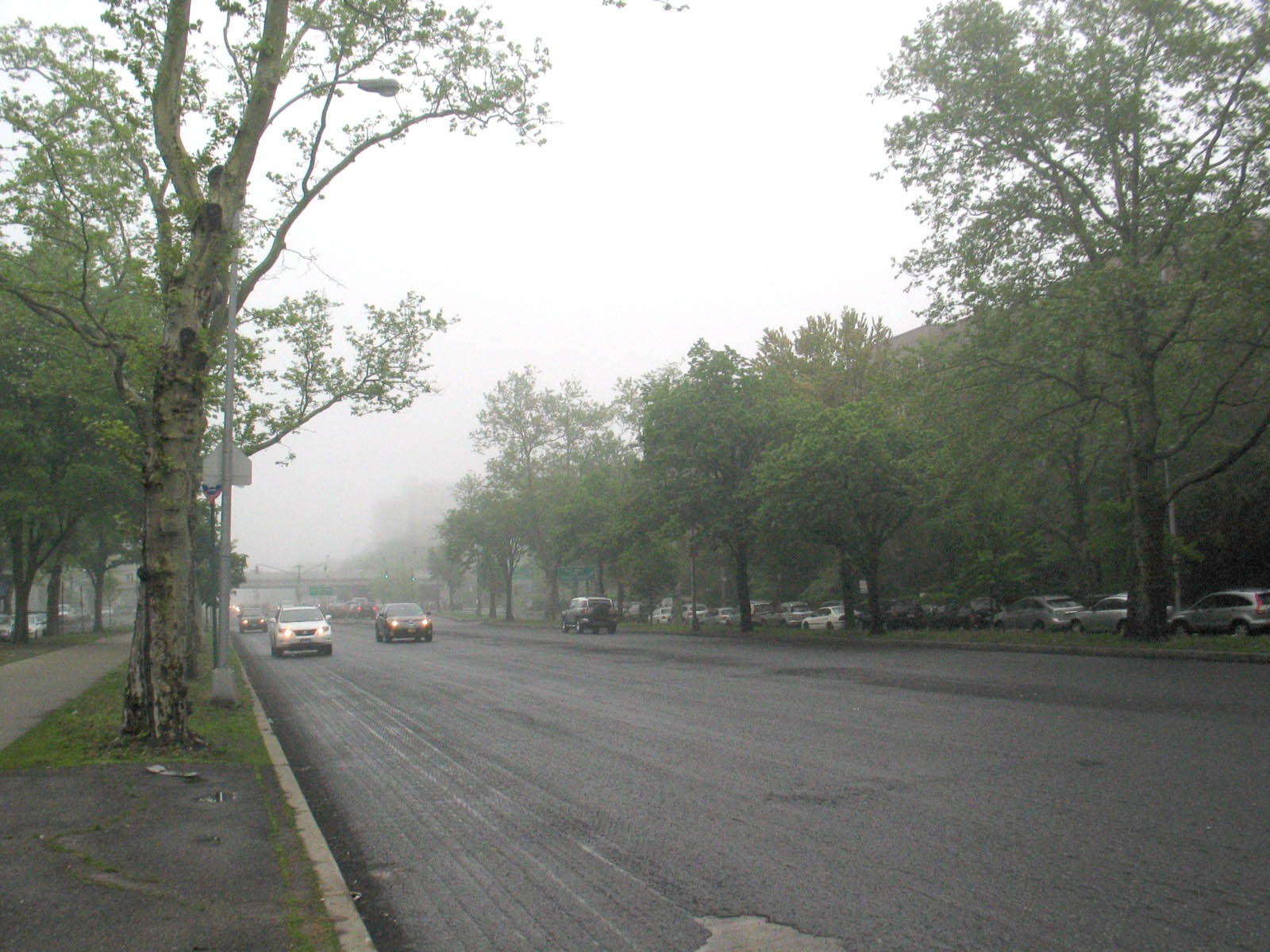
The main roadway seen in 2011

To improve pedestrian safety, the NYCDOT adjusted traffic lights in 2002 to give pedestrians extra time to cross the parkway. The interchange with Belt Parkway was also rebuilt. Despite being a major thoroughfare, Ocean Parkway retained its park-like character; one writer for The New York Times wrote that "every layer of the boulevard is a world, separated from the next by trees". Starting in 2011, the NYCDOT installed countdown pedestrian signals along Ocean Parkway as well. As part of the New York City Council's participatory budgeting program, local residents voted in 2012 to request $200,000 from the City Council to upgrade the crosswalk at Church Avenue and Ocean Parkway. The upgrades would have increased pedestrian safety, but the state government initially refused to upgrade the crosswalk. The New York state government finally agreed to upgrade the Church Avenue intersection the next year, and it also allocated $6 million for safety improvements to Ocean Parkway. In addition, many of the parkway's trees were felled after they were damaged during Hurricane Sandy.

In 2016, an overhaul of traffic regulations at major intersections was proposed, including traffic signals for service roads and turn restrictions at multiple intersections. The regulations were unpopular among residents but went into effect at Kings Highway and Avenue J in late 2016. The project was finished in 2017, though some motorists ignored the new traffic restrictions. As part of the Vision Zero program and to reduce traffic-related deaths, speed limits were lowered to 25 miles per hour (40 km/h), and speed cameras were installed. Local politicians who opposed the speed limit decrease, including Simcha Felder, wanted the speeds to be increased to 30 miles per hour (48 km/h) or higher. In addition, the NYCDOT announced plans in 2018 to rebuild the intersection of Church Avenue and Ocean Parkway, including new pedestrian islands and curb extensions. In 2019, NYC Parks received $4 million to renovate Ocean Parkway's bike lane between Avenue R and Avenue X, but the repairs were postponed due to the COVID-19 pandemic in New York City. Construction on the bike path began in March 2023 and took one and a half years. Afterward, cyclists also requested that the city upgrade the rest of the bike path.

== Neighborhood ==
=== Structures ===
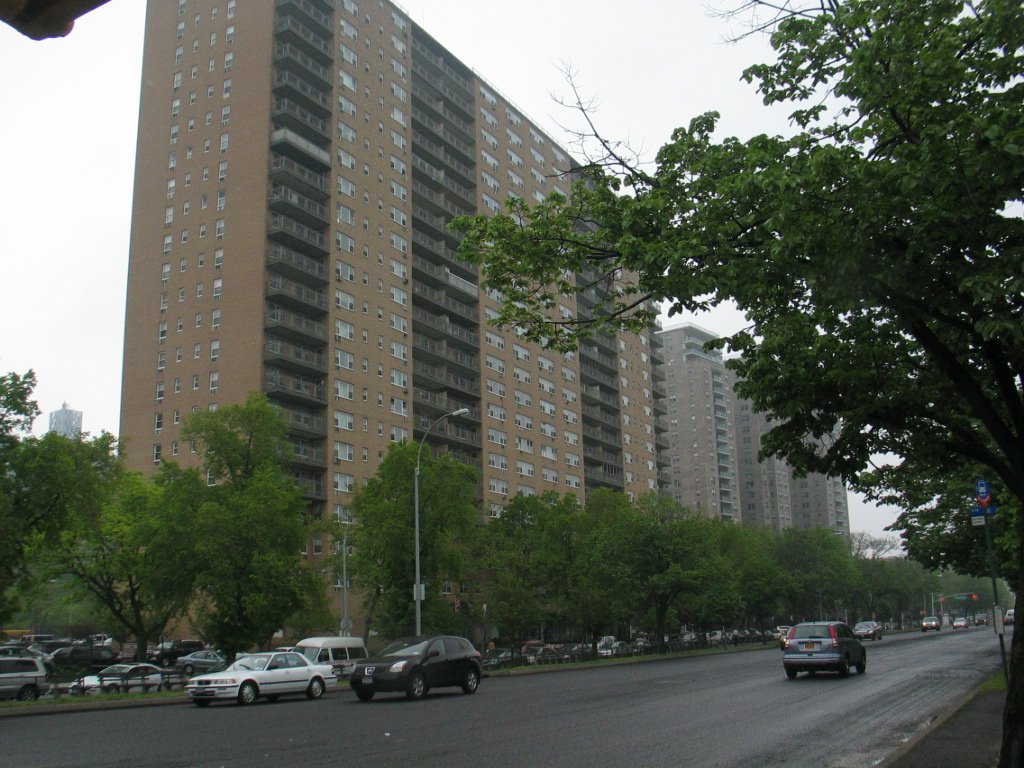
High-rise buildings on Ocean Parkway

Much of Ocean Parkway is zoned for mid-to-high-rise residential structures, which were developed along the parkway starting in the early 20th century. In Kensington to the north, Ocean Parkway has rental and cooperative apartment buildings of up to 20 stories, while side streets have lower-density housing. Within Gravesend to the south, there are condominiums and co-ops of six and seven stories on the parkway. There are also single-family and two-family homes along the parkway, although many of these homes have been expanded or combined over the years.

Ever since the parkway was established, all buildings on the parkway have been required to include a 30-foot-deep (9.1 m) front yard. State law allows courtyards, trees, shrubs, and other ornaments to be placed in the front yards, but most structures are banned. The parkway is part of the Special Ocean Parkway District, which extends from Park Circle to Brighton Beach Avenue and includes several parallel streets. New structures in the Special Ocean Parkway District must have a 30-foot-deep front yard, and paving is not permitted except on driveways and walkways. In addition, new and expanded buildings in the special district are subject to density restrictions.

There are several educational institutions along the parkway, such as Abraham Lincoln High School at Shore Parkway and Mir Yeshiva at Avenue R. In addition, South Brooklyn Health (formerly Coney Island Hospital) is located on Ocean Parkway near Avenue Z; there has been a hospital at that location since 1909. The Brighton Theatre, a popular attraction near the southern end of the parkway, operated until the 1950s.

==== Development history ====
Around 1900, homes were constructed along the perimeter of the parkway, and many mansions were built during World War I. People moved to Ocean Parkway from Bedford-Stuyvesant, Brooklyn Heights, and Bushwick. In the 1920s, some apartment complexes and one- and two-family homes were constructed, and there were many detached houses with 10 to 25 rooms. Luxurious apartment buildings with elevators were clustered around the northernmost portion of the parkway. Apartments began to replace private homes in the vicinity of the parkway after World War II, although these apartments tended to be no taller than six stories.

A large number of nursing homes, schools, and houses of worship were built on the parkway during the 1960s and 1970s. Most of Ocean Parkway's remaining private houses were on the eastern side of the parkway by the 1960s, and many of the parkway's mansions had been demolished by the 1970s. From 1960 to 1965 alone, twenty-six apartment buildings were developed on the parkway itself. Many of Ocean Parkway's apartment buildings were converted to co-ops during the late 20th century, particularly near the northern end of the parkway.

=== Community ===
In the 20th century, the areas around Ocean Parkway were largely populated by middle-class white residents, who moved away during the 1960s. A 1974 article in The New York Times described Ocean Parkway as a "series of small ethnic enclaves". There is an especially large Jewish population centered along Ocean Parkway between Avenue H and Belt Parkway. In addition to the Jewish community, there are black, Irish, Polish, Russian, and Hispanic communities along Ocean Parkway. The parkway's residents over the years have included the actress Lauren Bacall and the politician Elizabeth Holtzman.

The area has a large population of Syrian Jews, who started moving to the area in the 1950s. Within two decades, Ocean Parkway had the highest concentration of Syrian Jews in the United States. The New York Times estimated in 1980 that 60 to 70 percent of the population was Syrian Jewish, with more than 25,000 Syrian Jews near Ocean Parkway, Avenue S, and Avenue T. There is a high density of synagogues, yeshivas, and other traditionally Jewish institutions around Ocean Parkway. Many of the Syrian Jews who live on the parkway tend to be wealthy, and the parkway includes several mansions that protrude all the way to their lot line. In the 21st century, the southern part of the parkway had a large Sephardic Jewish population as well. One writer estimated in 2009 that 40,000 to 50,000 Jews lived near Ocean Parkway and that there were more than 40 synagogues on and around the parkway.

By the early 21st century, mansions along the parkway routinely sold for $1 million or more, while properties on parallel streets were much cheaper. The segment of the parkway between avenues S and U was in particularly high demand. Many residents of that area are Orthodox Jews who do not drive on Shabbat, so they instead walk to the synagogues and yeshivas on the parkway. Conversely, Orthodox Jewish families tended not to live in Ocean Parkway's multi-unit condominiums.

== Major intersections ==
The entire route is in the New York City borough of Brooklyn.

Location	mi	km	Destinations	Notes
Brighton Beach	0.00	0.00	Sea Breeze Avenue / Surf Avenue	Southern terminus of NYSDOT-maintained section
Brighton Beach	0.56	0.90	Belt Parkway – Kennedy Airport, Verrazano Bridge	Exit 7 on Belt Parkway
Gravesend	2.13	3.43	Kings Highway	
Kensington	4.86	7.82	Church Avenue	Access via service roads only
Kensington	4.86	7.82	NY 27 west (Prospect Expressway) to I-278 (Brooklyn-Queens Expressway)	Northern terminus of NYSDOT-maintained section; exit 6 on NY 27; ramps and eastern service road continue to Machate Circle
1.000 mi = 1.609 km; 1.000 km = 0.621 mi

== See also ==
- List of parkways in New York
- List of New York City Designated Landmarks in Brooklyn
- List of New York City scenic landmarks
- National Register of Historic Places listings in Brooklyn
