= Edmond J. Safra Synagogue (Florida) =

Synagogue in Florida

- Location in Miami, Florida

Religion
- Affiliation: Orthodox Judaism
- Rite: Sephardi
- Ecclesiastical or organisational status: Synagogue
- Leadership: Rabbi Yosef Galimidi
- Status: Active

Location
- Location: 19275 Mystic Pointe Drive, Aventura, Miami-Dade County, Florida 33180
- Country: United States
- Coordinates: 25°57′17″N 80°7′35″W

Architecture
- Architect: Frankel Benayoun
- Type: Synagogue
- Funded by: Edmond J. Safra Foundation
- Groundbreaking: 1997
- Completed: 2001

Website
- ejsfl.org

The Edmond J. Safra Synagogue is an Orthodox Jewish synagogue located at 19275 Mystic Pointe Drive, Aventura, Miami-Dade County, Florida, in the United States. The congregation practises in the Sephardi rite. Rabbi Yosef Galimidi has served as rabbi since 2008. The synagogue is one of the largest Sephardic congregations in Florida.

The synagogue is one of several that are eponymous with Edmond J. Safra, a former banker and philanthropist, partially or fully funded by the Edmond J. Safra Foundation.

== History ==
The community originated in Aleppo, Syria. The synagogue broke ground in 1997 and was completed in 2001.
