= History of transport =

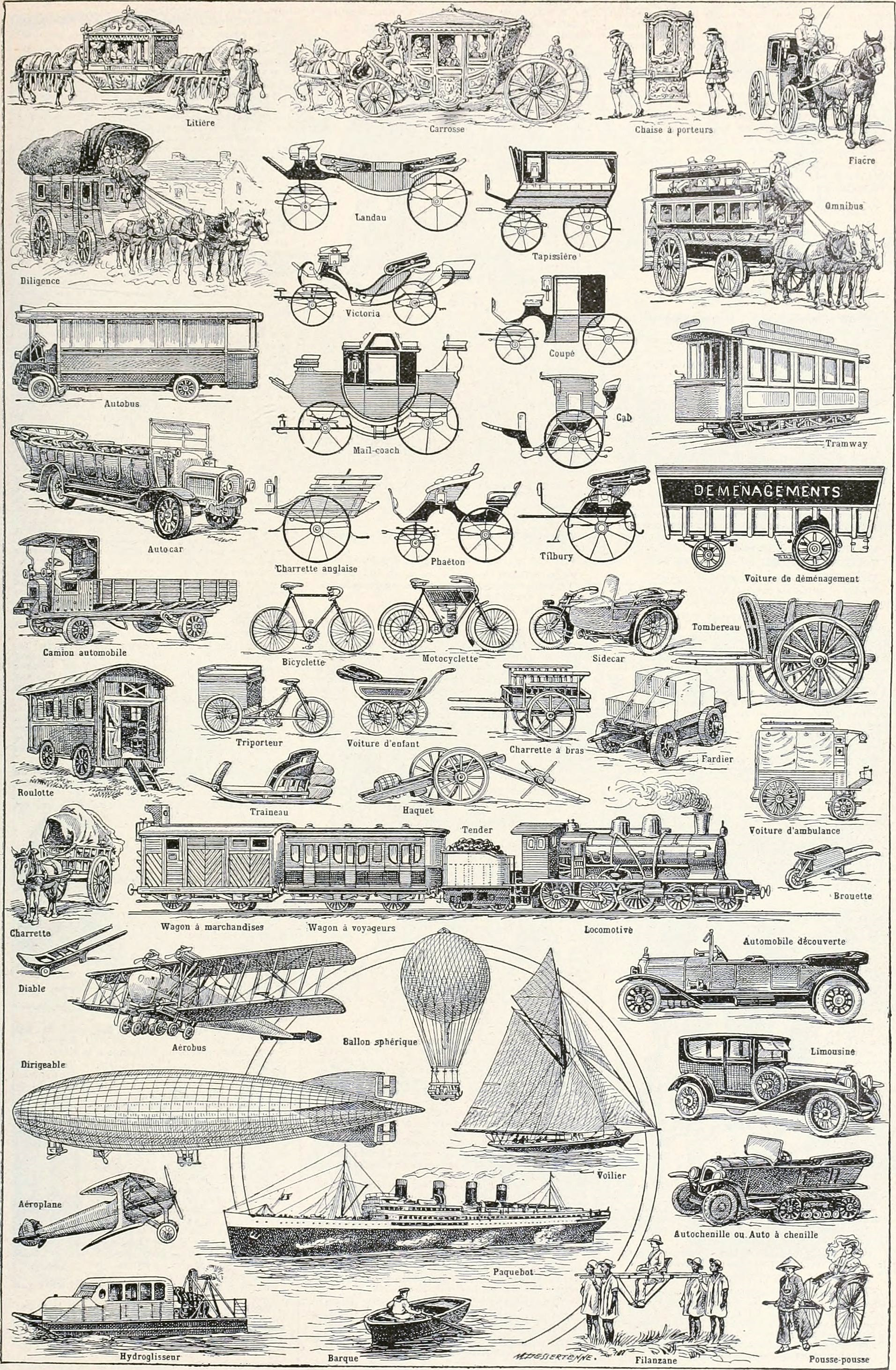

The history of transport is largely one of technological innovation. Advances in technology have allowed people to travel farther, explore more territory, and expand their influence over increasingly larger areas. Even in ancient times, new tools such as foot coverings, skis, and snowshoes increased the distances people could travel. As new inventions and discoveries were applied to transport problems, travel time decreased while the ability to move more and larger loads increased. Innovation continues as transport researchers are working to find new ways to reduce costs and increase transport efficiency.

International trade was the driving motivator behind advancements in global transportation in the pre-modern world. "...there was a single global world economy with a worldwide division of labor and multilateral trade from 1500 onward." The sale and transportation of textiles, silver and gold, spices, slaves, and luxury goods throughout Afro-Eurasia and later the New World would see an evolution in overland and sea trade routes and travel.

== Land ==
=== Road ===
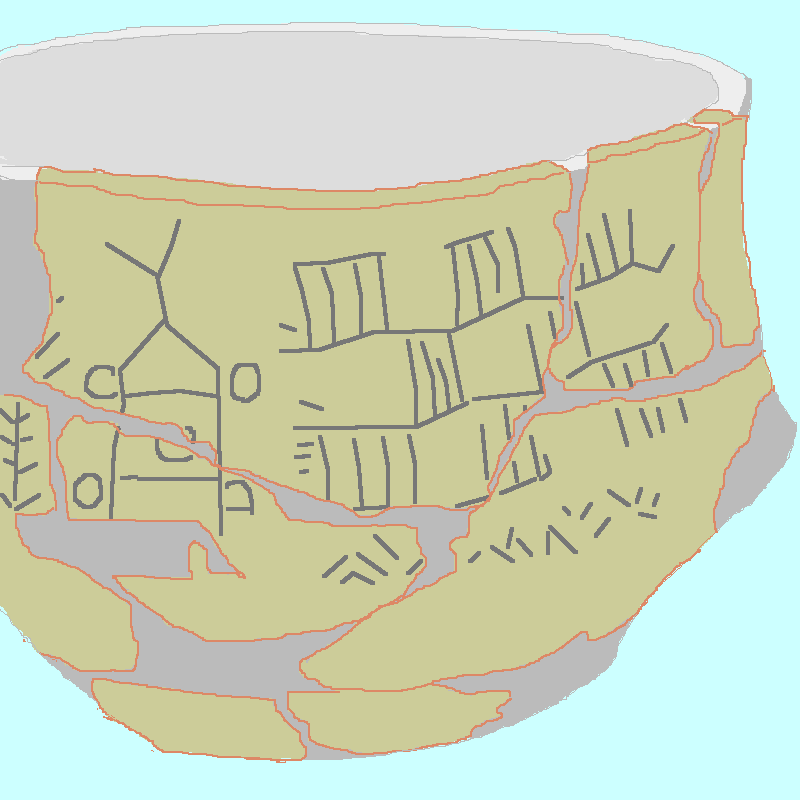
Bronocice pot with the earliest known image of a wheeled vehicle in the world.

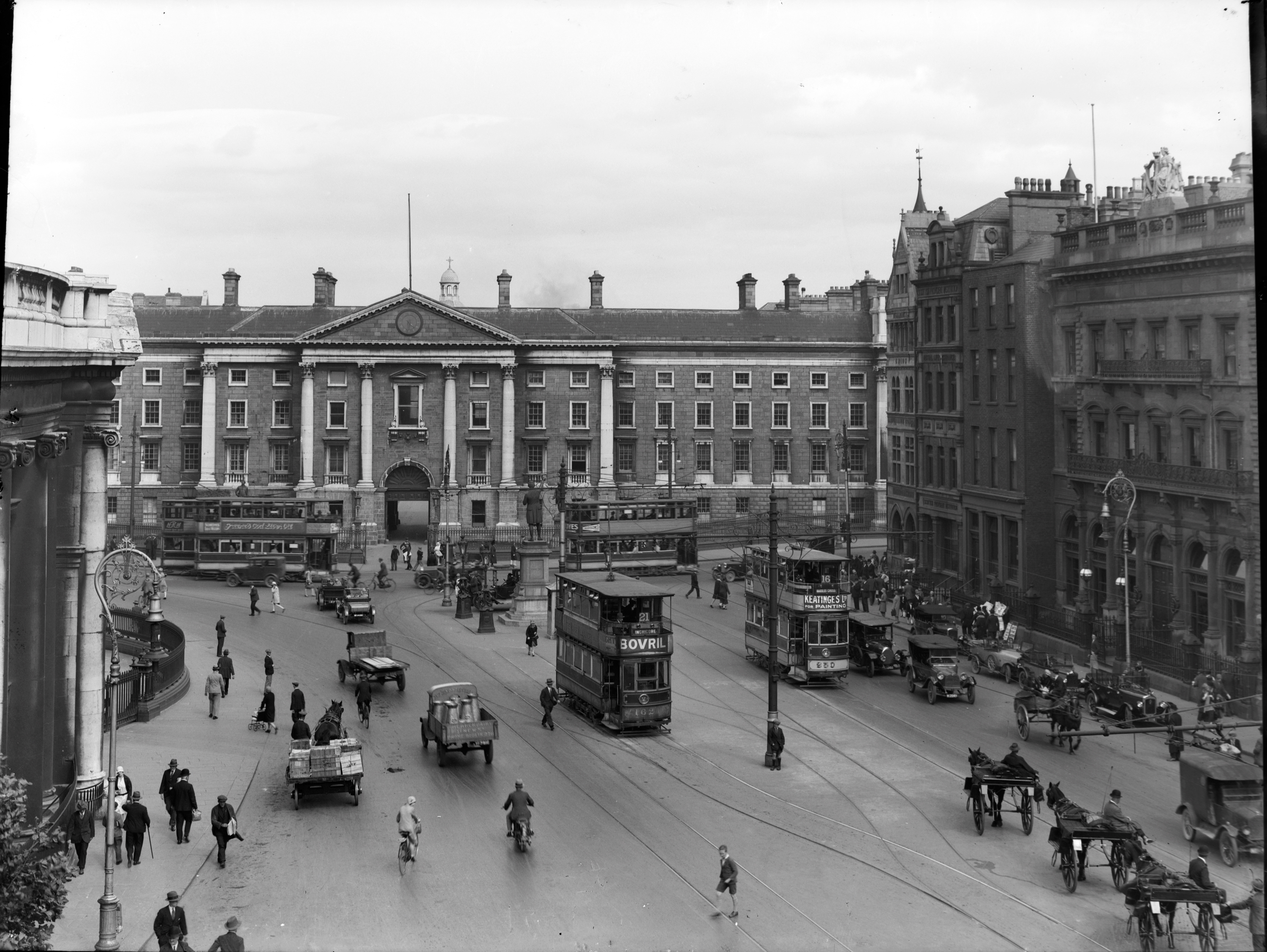
Modes of road transport in Dublin, 1929

Humans created the first earth tracks by carrying goods, often following trails. Tracks would be naturally created at points of high traffic density. As animals were domesticated, horses, oxen, and donkeys became part of track creation. With the growth of trade, tracks were often flattened or widened to accommodate animal traffic (hollow way or drover's road). Later, the travois, a frame used to drag loads, was developed. Animal-drawn wheeled vehicles were probably developed in the ancient Near East in the 4th or 5th millennium BC and spread to Europe and India in the 4th millennium BC and China in about 3000 BC. The Romans needed good roads to extend and maintain their empire and developed Roman roads.

During the Industrial Revolution, John Loudon McAdam (1756–1836) designed the first modern highways, using inexpensive paving material of soil and stone aggregate (macadam), and embanked roads a few centimetres higher than the surrounding terrain to cause water to drain away from the surface.

With the development of motor transport, starting in 1883 in Germany and in the U.S. in 1908 with the production of Ford's first Model T, there was an increased need for hard-topped roads to reduce washaways, bogging and dust on both urban and rural roads, originally using cobblestones and wooden paving in major western cities and in the early 20th century tar-bound macadam (tarmac) and concrete paving. In 1902, Nottingham's Radcliffe Road became the first tarmac road in the world.

=== Rail ===
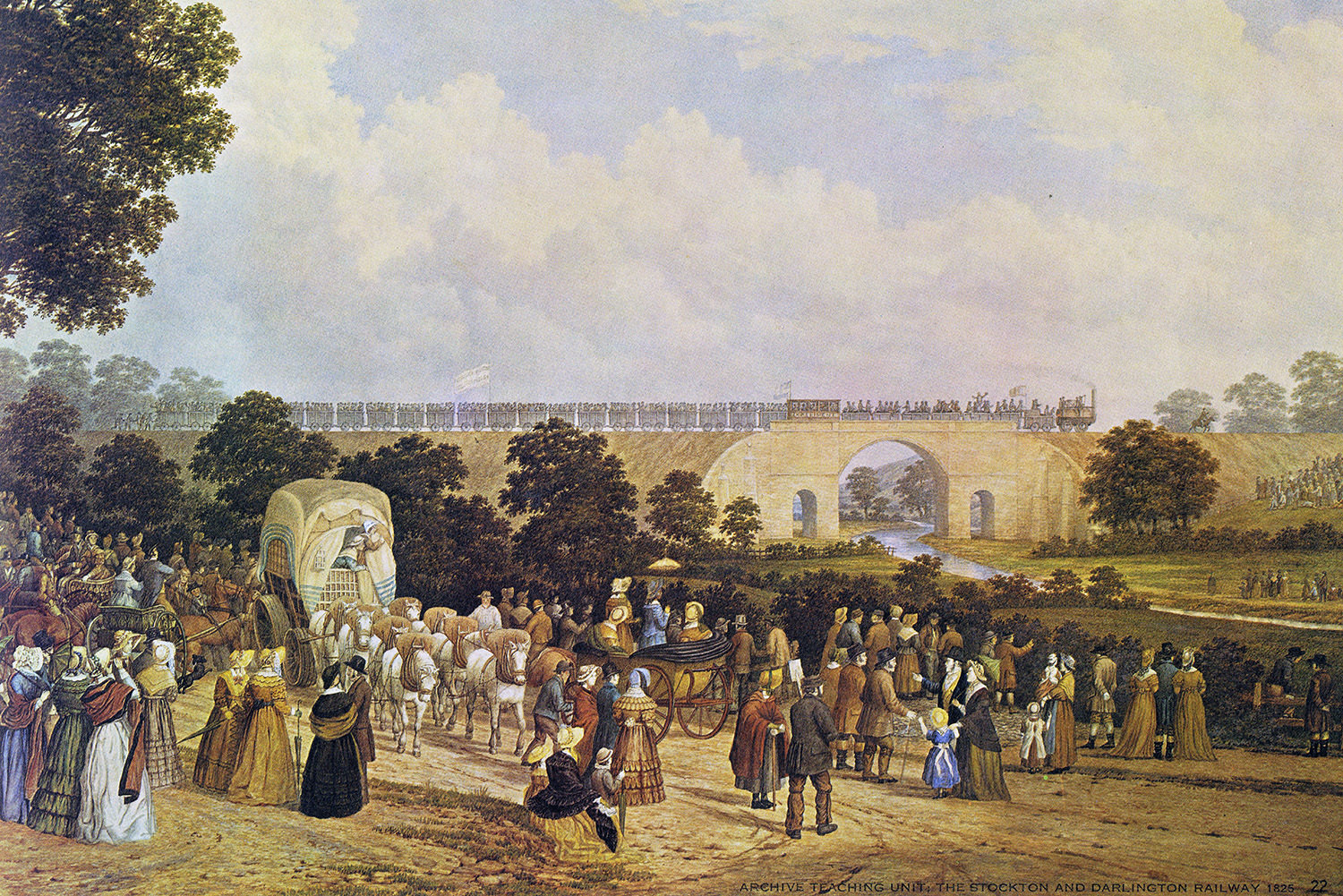
Stockton Darlington steam locomotive Railway construction 1820

Liverpool and Manchester steam locomotive Railway opening (1830)

The history of rail transportation dates back nearly 500 years and includes systems with man or horsepower and rails of wood (or occasionally stone). This was usually for moving coal from the mine down to a river, from where it could continue by boat, with a flanged wheel running on a rail. The use of cast iron plates as rails began in the 1760s, and was followed by systems (plateways) where the flange was part of the rail. However, rolled wrought iron rails made these obsolete.

The first passenger-carrying public railway was opened by the Swansea and Mumbles Railway at Oystermouth in 1807, using horse-drawn carriages on existing tramlines. In 1802, Richard Trevithick designed and built the first (unnamed) steam locomotive to run on smooth rails. He was a Cornish engineer and showed off his railway invention in the Welsh mining town of Merthyr Tydfil.

Before the breakthrough with the first railway engine, Trevithick had faced failures and successes along the way. One of his first successful demonstrations was the "Puffing Devil" steam-powered locomotive in 1802, whereas a disaster in Greenwich in 1803 almost sealed the fate of locomotive travel, when four men were killed by an explosion of one of Trevithick's engines. His rivals used this incident as leverage to stop the production of high-pressure steam engines.

However, Trevithick's "Penydarren locomotive" made its place in history as the first full-scale working railway steam locomotive. A bet between Trevithick's benefactor, Samuel Homfray, and Richard Crawshay prompted the locomotive's key demonstration. Homfray wagered 500 guineas that the locomotive would transport ten tonnes of iron from the Pendydarren Ironworks to the village of Abercynon, nearly ten miles away.

Trevithick's locomotive completed the journey in just over four hours, ultimately proving the locomotive's sturdiness and reliability. However, Trevithick never got the credit he deserved and died destitute in 1833.

==== Modern locomotive ====
Modern rail transport systems first appeared in England in the 1820s.

Matthew Murray proved the viability of the steam engine in 1812. Salamanca was the first locomotive to incorporate two cylinders.

George Stephenson, who went on to become known as the father of railways, is said to have built 16 experimental locomotives for use from the year 1814–1826; the last train he introduced, known as the Killingworth Billy, ran until 1881. The first intercity railway between Liverpool and Manchester was built by Stephenson in 1830. These systems, which made use of the steam locomotive, were the first practical form of mechanized land transport, and they remained the primary form of mechanized land transport for the next 100 years. The first railroad built in Great Britain was the Stockton and Darlington, which opened in 1825. It used a steam locomotive built by George Stephenson and was practical only for hauling minerals. The Liverpool and Manchester Railway, which opened in 1830, was the first modern railroad. It was a public carrier of both passengers and freight. By 1870, Britain had about 13,500 miles (21,700 km) of railroad.

In 1879, electric locomotive development was booming in Germany. In the late 19th century, German electrical engineer and inventor Werner von Siemens demonstrated the first experimental electric passenger train. The train carried around 90,000 people and used an insulated third rail to supply electricity. In 1881, Siemens built the world's first electric tram line in the Berlin suburb of Lichterfelde. Following this trend, many such initiatives were set up in Brighton and Vienna in 1883.

Diesel Locomotives

Dr Rudolf Diesel developed a new type of railway locomotive that used a new internal combustion method to propel the railway. In 1892, he proposed this method, which soon sparked speculation about whether this type of engine would actually work. From the late 19th century to the early 20th century, Rudolf Diesel worked to put diesel on track and improve the power-to-weight ratio. He worked at a Swiss engineering firm, Sulzer. Eventually, by the end of the Second World War, steam engines became obsolete and were rarely used in developed countries.

At the system's greatest extent, in 1914, there were about 20,000 miles (32,000 km) of track, run by 120 competing companies. The British government combined all these companies into four main groups in 1923 as an economic measure.

British Railways, by name British Rail, the former national railway system of Great Britain, was created by the Transport Act 1947, which inaugurated public ownership of the railways.

The history of rail transport also includes the history of rapid transit and arguably the history of monorail.

== Water ==
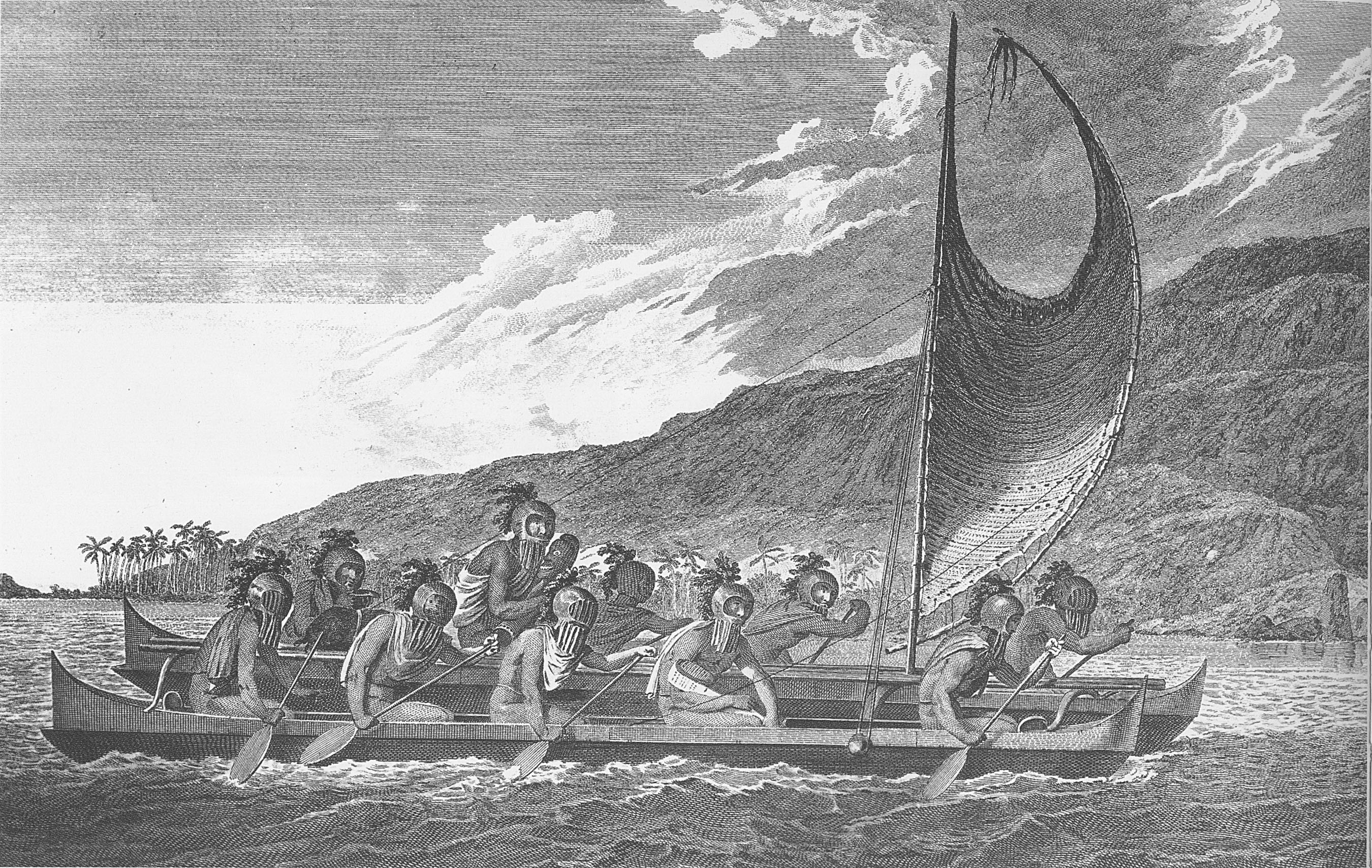
A traditional Polynesian catamaran in 1778 CE

In the Stone Age, primitive boats developed to navigate rivers and fish in rivers and off the coast. It has been argued that boats suitable for a significant sea crossing were necessary for people to reach Australia an estimated 40,000-45,000 years ago. With the development of civilization, vessels evolved for expansion and generally grew in size for trade and war. In the Mediterranean, galleys were developed about 3000 BC. Polynesian double-hulled sailing vessels with advanced rigging were used between 1,300 BC and 900 BC by the Polynesian progeny of the Lapita culture to expand 6,000 km across open ocean from the Bismarck Archipelago east to Micronesia and, eventually Hawaii. Galleys were eventually rendered obsolete by ocean-going sailing ships, such as the Iberian caravel in the 14th century, the Chinese treasure ship in the early 15th century, and the Mediterranean man-of-war in the late 15th century.

In the Industrial Revolution, the first steamboats and later diesel-powered ships were developed. Eventually submarines were developed mainly for military purposes for people's general benefit.

Meanwhile, specialized craft were developed for river and canal transport. Canals were developed in Mesopotamia c. 4000 BC. The Indus Valley civilization in Pakistan and North India (from c. 2600 BC) had the first canal irrigation system in the world. China's canal system, whose greatest accomplishment was the Sui dynasty's 1,794-kilometer (1,115 mi) 7th-century Grand Canal between Hangzhou and Beijing, was an essential aspect of its civilization, used for irrigation, flood control, taxation, commercial and military transport, and colonization of new lands from the Zhou dynasty until the end of the imperial era. Canals were developed in the Middle Ages in Europe in Venice and the Netherlands. Ramps for water were made in 1459. Pierre-Paul Riquet began to organise the construction of the 240 km-long Canal du Midi in France in 1665 and it was opened in 1681. In the Industrial Revolution, inland canals were built in England and later the United States before the development of railways. Specialized craft were also developed for fishing and later whaling.

Maritime history also deals with the development of navigation, oceanography, cartography, and hydrography.

=== Trade ===
Often, cities and their surrounding agricultural areas are not self-sufficient for agriculture. Because of this, people living in these regions were forced to trade with other cities, nomads, or pastoralists. People usually traded for raw materials such as tin, bronze, copper, iron ore, or animals. An "intercontinental model" of world trade, "between 1500 and 1800 on the basis of interregional competition in production and trade" was proposed by Frederic Mauro, but the early existence of it was already observed by Dudley North in the year 1691. This world market of trade, as well as the flow of finances throughout, spanned out an interconnected throughout the entire globe, permitted the intersectoral and intersectional regional divisions of both generated competition, and labor.

Through the water frontier, many people throughout history have traveled by water as much as they have by land. Along with this, quite a large number of individuals relied on the sea and maritime trade, raiding, piracy, or smuggling for survival. Littoral peoples, reflecting symbiosis of both land and sea, would often have more in common with one another than they would with their neighboring islands. Throughout centuries in the past, water supplied the cheapest, and sometimes the only means of transporting bulk materials on a large scale, and it was also the most secure way to ensure transport over long distances. Because of this, the proximity of the sea drew Southeast Asians to participate in long-distance trade, but it was not only water that linked the shores to one another - seafaring people, along with traders contributed to these trade routes as well.

==== Ports and inland ====
Maritime traders most often congregated in ports, which were considered the point in which land and sea met that linked the hinterland to the wider world. There were some ports that were more favored than others, blessed with a good location, with sufficient warehouse facilities, accessible harbors, and adequate supplies of food and water became "entrepôts," which were essentially the super-centers for trade. It was rare that these ports were ever considered a final destination, though, but rather central meeting points in what was an ever-changing economic and political environment. Whether in Asia, Europe, or Africa, these port centers consisted of ethnically and culturally diverse communities. Many officials were of foreign birth or ancestry, skilled in various cultures and languages of foreign merchants, to effectively supervise trade. In many ports, merchants became a powerful group in local politics. Further, these ports promoted cultural exchange, along with economic exchange, due to the fact that it had been open to the world for races, cultures, and ideas to intermix with one another, along with the fact that this blend of both locals and outsiders from diverse backgrounds that were open to accepting cultural differences. Nation-building and modernity reduced the role of trade through the sea and increased the reliance on trade through the land and the air in economic and social exchange. While cities like Singapore, Bangkok, and Hong Kong remain vibrant and open to the world, similar to their early modern roles, only a few ports are as economically crucial today as they were in the past.

Inland trade moved both by water, and overland itself. For example, shipping in small boats went along the coasts of India, but inland waterways were readily available to use to transport goods throughout many parts of India, especially in the south. Caravans that contained numbers from ten, all the way to up forty thousand pack or draft animals moved overland at a time. Combinations of these forms of transportation carried throughout the subcontinent and were therefore transshipped to and from long-distance maritime trade. The majority of all of the port cities were in symbiosis with the caravan routes to and from their related hinterland interiors, and sometimes even with distant transcontinental regions. This is especially true in Central Asia - and it is suggested that the continental trade over both the land and the ocean maritime trade should be viewed not as separate or competitive, but rather as mirror images of one another.

== Air ==
Humanity's desire to fly likely dates to the first time man observed birds, an observation illustrated in the legendary stories of Daedalus and Icarus in Greek mythology, and the Vimanas in Indian mythology. Much of the focus of early research was on imitating birds, but through trial and error, balloons, airships, gliders and eventually powered aircraft and other types of flying machines were invented.

Kites were the first form of man-made flying objects, and early records suggest that kites were around before 200 BC in China. Leonardo da Vinci's dream of flight found expression in several designs, but he did not attempt to demonstrate flight by literally constructing them.

During the 17th and 18th centuries, scientists began analyzing the Earth's atmosphere and discovered gases such as hydrogen, leading to the invention of hydrogen balloons. Various theories in mechanics by physicists during the same period of time—notably fluid dynamics and Newton's laws of motion—led to the foundation of modern aerodynamics. Tethered balloons filled with hot air were used in the first half of the 19th century and saw considerable action in several mid-century wars, most notably the American Civil War, where balloons provided observation during the Siege of Petersburg.

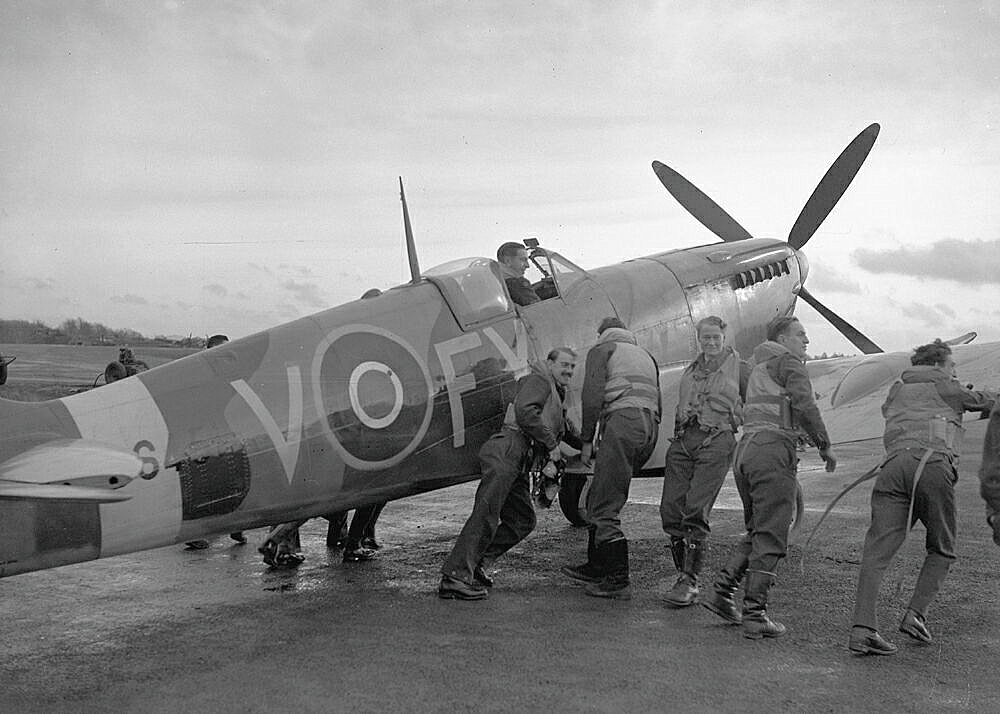
Pilots of 611 West Lancashire Squadron lend a hand pushing an early Spitfire Mark IXb, Biggin Hill, late 1942.

Apart from some scattered reference in ancient and medieval records, resting on slender evidence and in need of interpretation, the earliest clearly verifiable human flight took place in Paris in 1783, when Jean-François Pilâtre de Rozier and François Laurent d'Arlandes went 5 miles (8.0 km) in a hot air balloon invented by the Montgolfier brothers. The Wright brothers made the first sustained, controlled and powered heavier-than-air flight on 17 December 1903, in their revolutionary aircraft, the Wright Flyer.

World War II saw a drastic increase in the pace of aircraft development and production. All countries involved in the war stepped up development and production of aircraft and flight-based weapon delivery systems, such as the first long-range bomber.

After the war ended, commercial aviation grew rapidly, using mostly ex-military aircraft to transport people and cargo. This growth was accelerated by the glut of heavy and super-heavy bomber airframes like the Lancaster that could be converted into commercial aircraft. The first commercial jet airliner to fly was the British De Havilland Comet. This marked the beginning of the Jet Age, a period of relatively cheap and fast international travel.

In the beginning of the 21st century, subsonic military aviation focused on eliminating the pilot in favor of remotely operated or completely autonomous vehicles. Several unmanned aerial vehicles or UAVs have been developed. In April 2001, the unmanned aircraft Global Hawk flew from Edwards AFB in the US to Australia non-stop and unrefueled. This is the longest point-to-point flight ever undertaken by an unmanned aircraft, and took 23 hours and 23 minutes. In October 2003, the first totally autonomous flight across the Atlantic by a computer-controlled model aircraft occurred. Major disruptions to air travel in the 21st century included the closing of U.S. airspace following the September 11 attacks, the closing of northern European airspace after the 2010 eruptions of Eyjafjallajökull, and the COVID-19 pandemic.

== Space ==
The realistic dream of spaceflight dated back to Konstantin Tsiolkovsky, however Tsiolkovsky wrote in Russian, and this was not widely influential outside Russia. Spaceflight became an engineering possibility with the work of Robert H. Goddard's publication in 1919 of his paper 'Robert H. Goddard#A Method of Reaching Extreme Altitudes'; where his application of the de Laval nozzle to liquid-propellant rockets gave sufficient power that interplanetary travel became possible. This paper was highly influential on Hermann Oberth and Wernher von Braun, later key players in spaceflight.

The first human spaceflight was achieved with the Soviet space program's Vostok 1 mission in 1961. The lead architects behind the mission were Sergei Korolev and Kerim Kerimov, with Yuri Gagarin being the first astronaut. On May 5, 1961, the US launched its first suborbital Mercury astronaut, Alan Shepard, in the Freedom 7 capsule. Kerimov later went on to launch the first space docks (Kosmos 186 and Kosmos 188) in 1967 and the first space stations (Salyut and Mir series) from 1971 to 1991. The first spaceflight to the Moon was achieved with NASA's Apollo 11 mission in 1969, with Neil Armstrong and Buzz Aldrin being the first astronauts on the Moon.

== Navigational advances ==
The 13th century saw the rise of the magnetic compass for overseas travel. Prior to its creation, seamen would have to rely on landmarks and stars as guides for navigation. The compass allowed sailors to plot a course, and using magnetic north as a reference, could travel through fog and overcast. This also led to shorter voyages, as they could plot more linear approaches to destinations. Portolan charts rose up, plotting this linear excursion routes, making sea navigation more accurate and efficient. In 1761, marine chronometer was invented.

== See also ==
- History of public transport
- Medieval transport
- Timeline of artificial satellites and space probes
- Timeline of aviation
- Timeline of diving technology
- Timeline of jet power
- Timeline of transportation technology
