= Gravesend, Brooklyn =

Neighborhood in New York City

Gravesend
- Neighborhood of Brooklyn
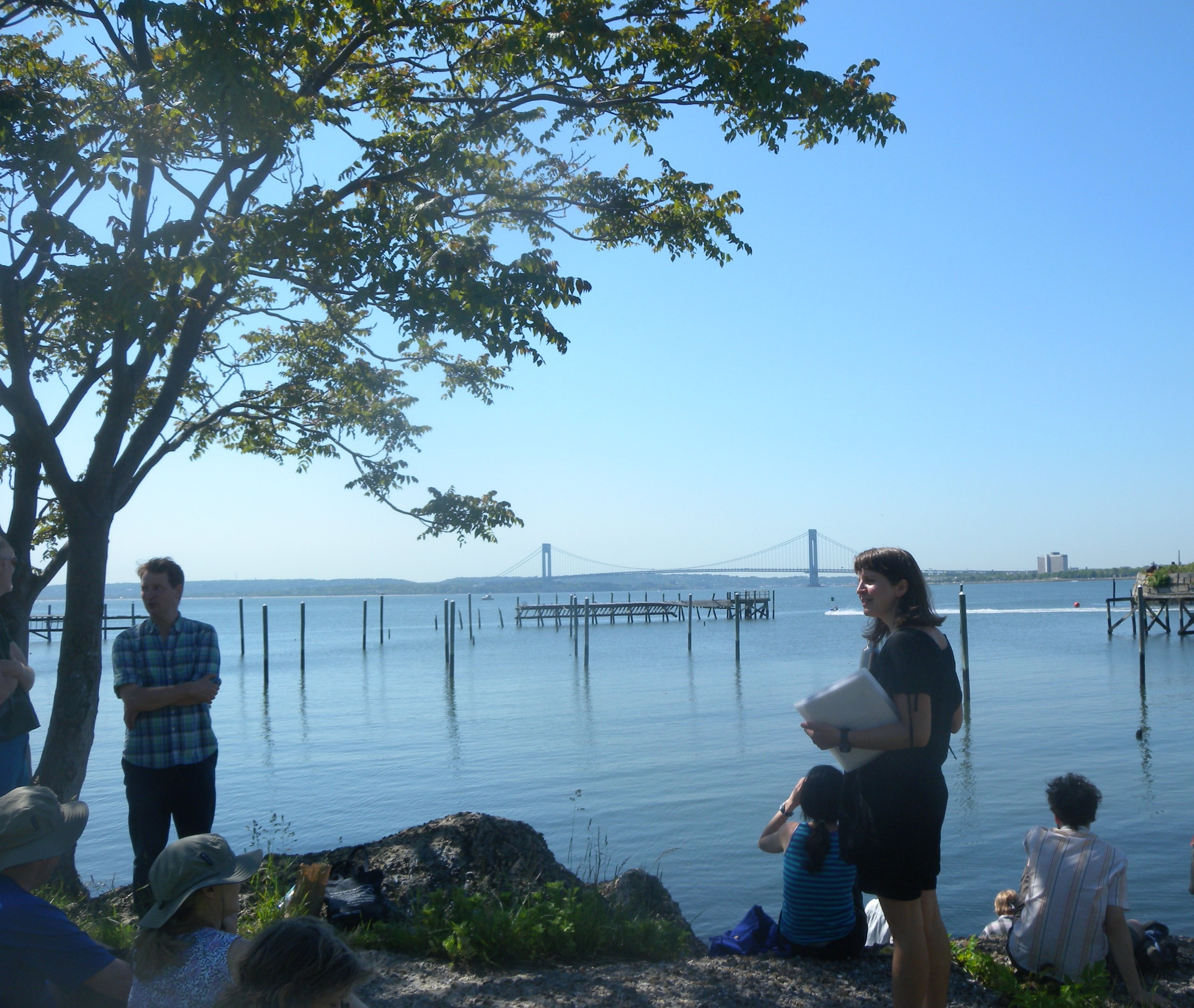
- Looking at Gravesend Bay from Gravesend (2012)
- Etymology: see below
- Interactive map of Gravesend
- Coordinates: 40.598°N 73.971°W
- Country: United States
- State: New York
- City: New York City
- Borough: Brooklyn

Area
  - Total: 1.144 sq mi (2.962 km^{2})

Population (2010)
  - Total: 29,436
  - Density: 25,740/sq mi (9,938/km^{2})

Ethnicity
  - White: 52.8%
  - Asian: 21.2
  - Hispanic: 16.0
  - Black: 8.4
  - Other: 1.5
- ZIP Code: 11223
- Area codes: 718, 347, 929, and 917

Gravesend is a neighborhood in the south-central section of the New York City borough of Brooklyn, on the southwestern edge of Long Island in the U.S. state of New York. It is bounded by the Belt Parkway to the south, Bay Parkway to the west, Avenue P to the north, and Ocean Parkway to the east.

Gravesend was one of the original towns in the Dutch colony of New Netherland. After the English took over, it was one of the six original towns of Kings County in colonial New York. Gravesend was the only English chartered town in what became Kings County and is notable as being one of the first towns founded by a woman, Deborah, Lady Moody. The town of Gravesend encompassed 7,000 acres (2,800 ha) in southern Kings County, including the entire peninsula of Coney Island, and was annexed by the City of Brooklyn in 1894.

The modern-day neighborhood is part of Brooklyn Community Board 11, Brooklyn Community Board 13 and Brooklyn Community Board 15. As of 2020, Gravesend had a population of 30,587.

== Name ==
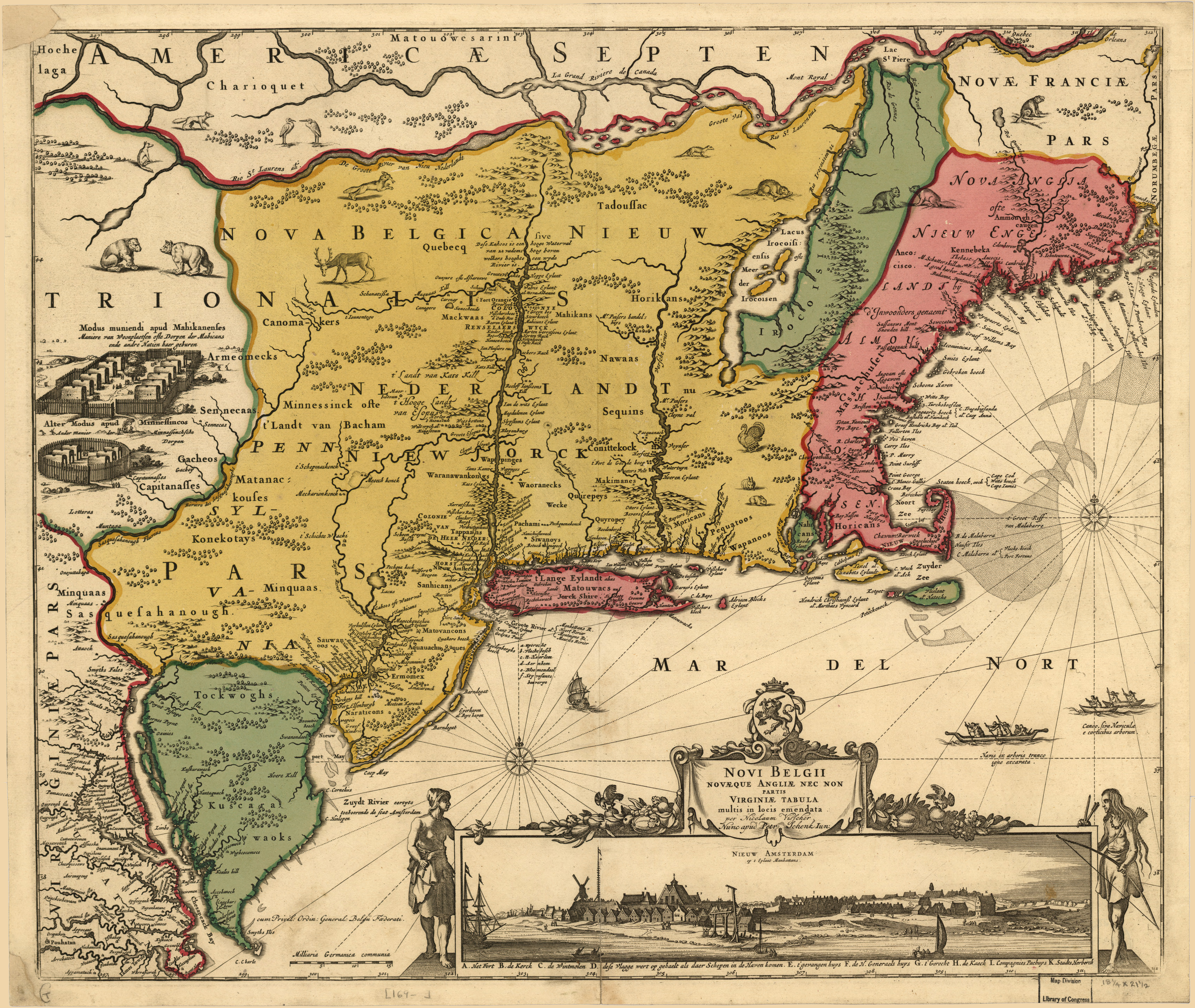
New Netherland map 1656

The name "Gravesend" was given to the area by New Amsterdam's Dutch authorities. Local sources think that the name probably comes from Dutch words, which when combined can mean "groves end" or "count's beach."

Historic sources, written in Dutch, suggest that it was named by the Dutch governor general Willem Kieft for the Dutch settlement of 's'Gravesande (now 's-Gravenzande) in the Netherlands, which means "count's beach" or "count's sand." A 1656 map of Nova Belgica confirms this, by mentioning the names of Dutch towns like Vlissingen (Flushing), Breukelen (Brooklyn), Amersfoort (Flatlands), Heemstee (Hempstead, Heemstede which means homestead) and Gravesant ('s-Gravenzande).

Because of the association with Lady Moody, some speculate that it was named after the English seaport of Gravesend, Kent.

== Geography ==
The modern neighborhood of Gravesend lies between East 12th Street or Coney Island Avenue to the east, Stillwell Avenue to the west, Avenue P to the north, and Coney Island Creek and Shore Parkway to the south. To the east of Gravesend is Homecrest and Sheepshead Bay, to the northeast Midwood, to the northwest Bensonhurst, and to the west Bath Beach. To the south, across Coney Island Creek, lies the neighborhood of Coney Island, and across Shore Parkway lies Brighton Beach.

Calvert Vaux Park, formerly Dreier Offerman Park, is located southwest of the neighborhood.

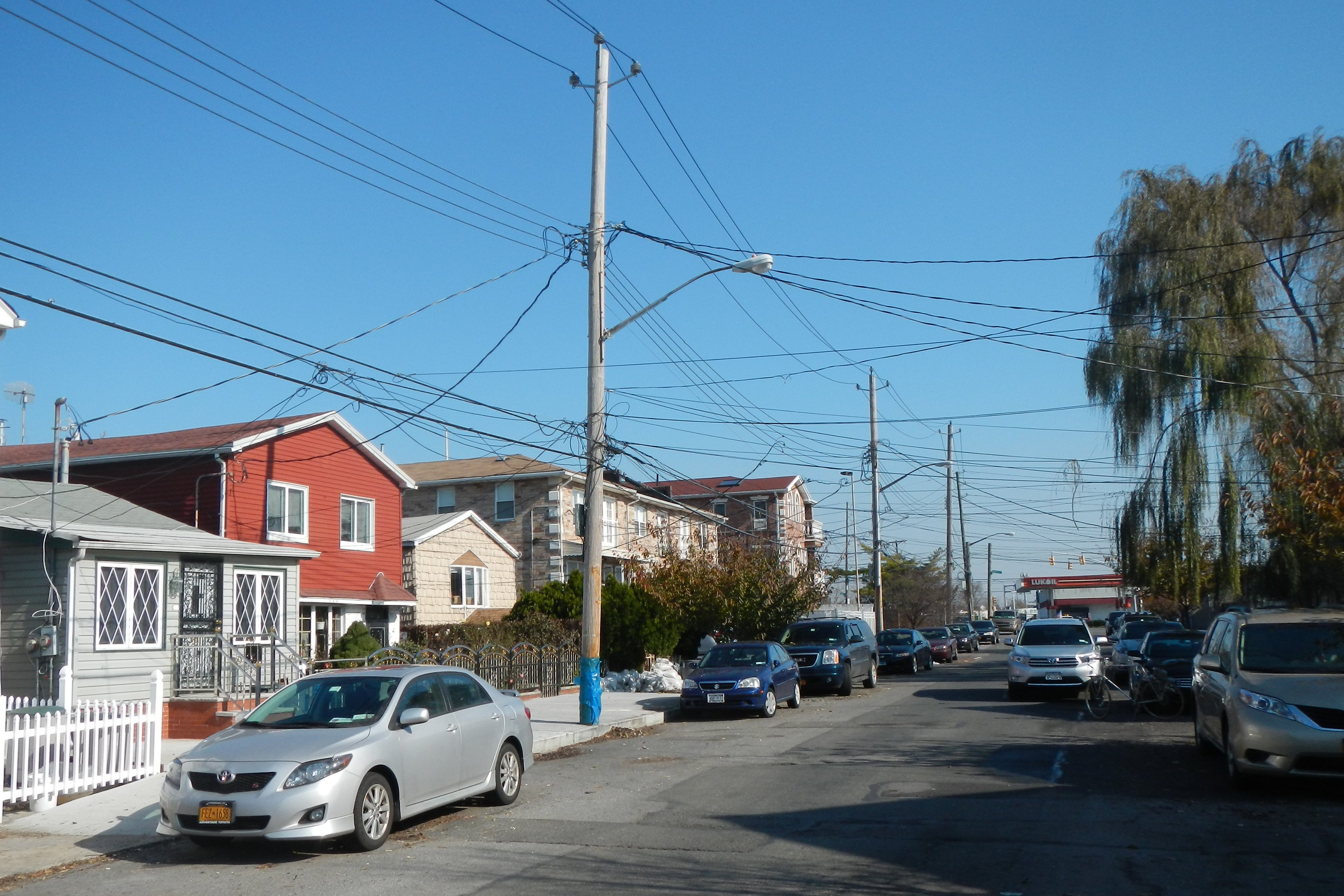
Bay 53rd Street

=== White Sands ===
South of Shore Parkway and north of Coney Island Creek, is sometimes called White Sands. Originally, White Sands consisted of several short, dead-end streets with no through-routes within the neighborhood. Currently, it consists of two blocks of residences and a Home Depot location.

White Sands' name is derived from the white sand which formerly covered the shore and the mouth of Coney Island Creek. The first houses to be built in the neighborhood were bungalows that were raised on stilts above the sand, but as development slowly progressed, much of the sand was removed and replaced with landfill. In 1993, Home Depot became interested in White Sands as the location for a new store due to its location near the highly used Cropsey Avenue and Shore Parkway. By 2000, Home Depot had acquired about two-thirds of the properties in White Sands, and by 2002, the acquired properties had been razed and replaced by a new Home Depot location.

== History ==
=== Early history ===
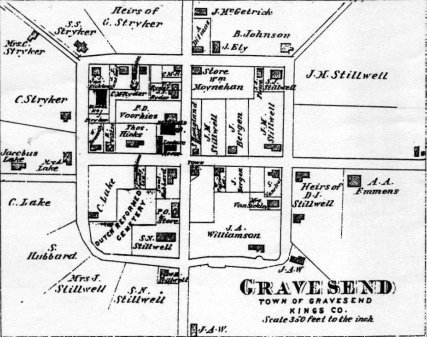
1873 map of Gravesend by Alvin Jewitt Johnson

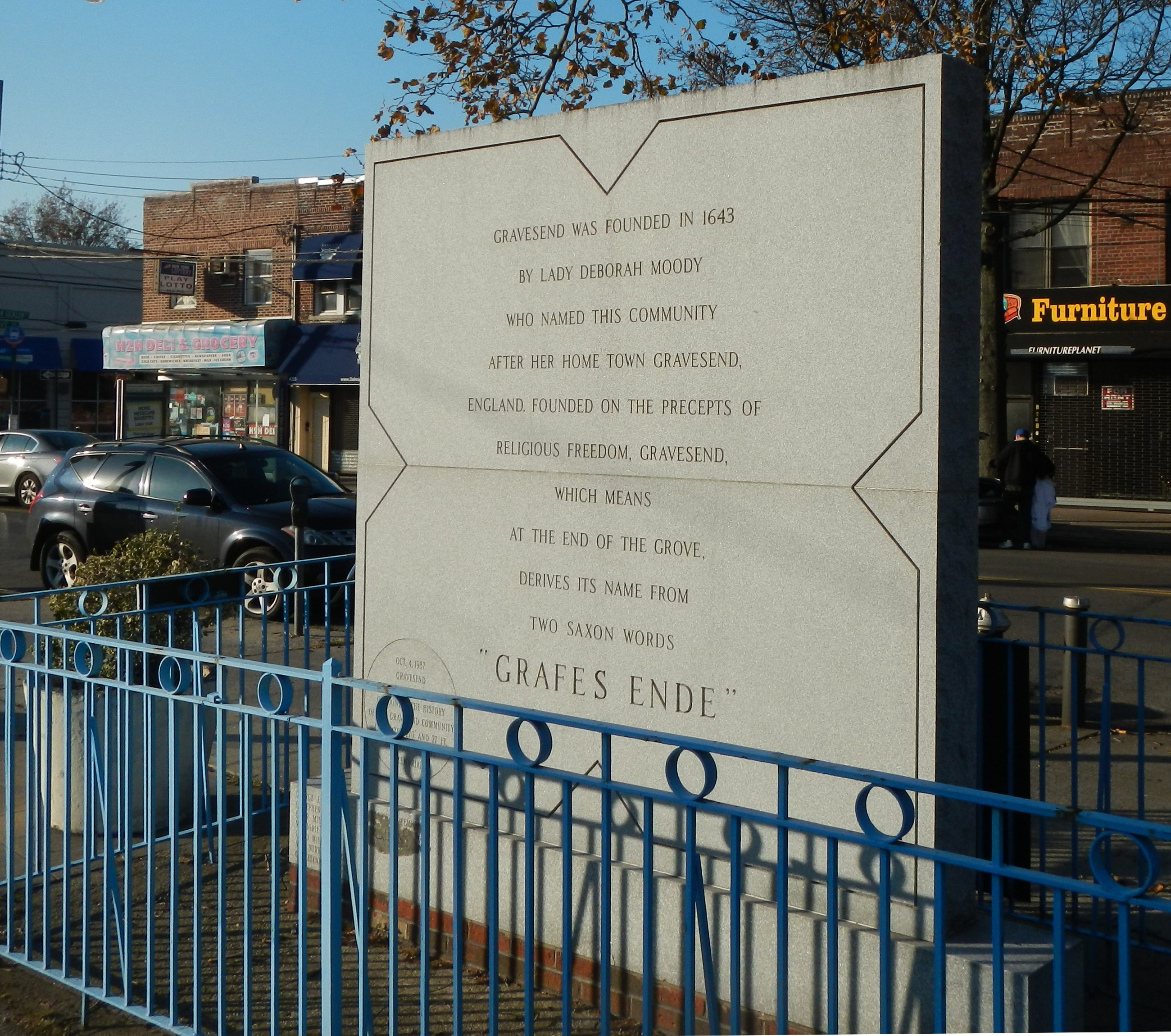
Lady Deborah Moody memorial

The island and its environs were first inhabited by bands of Lenape, an Algonquian-speaking tribe that occupied territory along both sides of Long Island Sound, and through coastal areas through present-day New Jersey and down to Delaware. The first known European believed to set foot in the area that would become Gravesend was Henry Hudson, whose ship, the Half Moon, landed at Coney Island in the fall of 1609. The Dutch claimed this land as part of their New Netherland Colony.

Gravesend is notable as one of the few colonial towns to be founded by a woman, Lady Deborah Moody (Jeanne Mance being another notable female founder). In 1643, governor general Willem Kieft granted her and a group of English settlers a land patent on December 19, 1645. Moody, along with John Tilton and wife Mary Pearsall Tilton, came to Gravesend after choosing excommunication, following religious persecution in Lynn, Massachusetts. Moody and Mary Tilton had been tried because of their Anabaptist beliefs, accused of spreading religious dissent in the Puritan colony. Kieft was recruiting settlers to secure this land that his forces had taken from the Lenape. Some clashes continued, and the town organization was not completed until 1645. The signed town charter and grant was one of the first to ever be awarded to a woman in the New World. John Tilton became the first town clerk of Gravesend and owned part of what later would become Coney Island. Moody, the Tiltons, and other early English settlers were known to have paid the Lenape for their land. Another prominent early settler was Anthony Janszoon van Salee.

The Town of Gravesend encompassed 7,000 acres (2,800 ha) in southern Kings County, including the entire island of Coney Island. This was originally used as the town's common lands on the Atlantic Ocean. It was divided, as was the town itself, into 41 parcels for the original patentees. When the town was first laid out, almost half of the area was made up of salt marsh wetlands and sandhill dunes along the shore of Gravesend Bay. It was one of the earliest planned communities in America. It consisted of a 16-acre (6.5 ha) square surrounded by a 20-foot-high wooden palisade. The town was bisected by two main roads, Gravesend Road (now McDonald Avenue) running from north to south, and Gravesend Neck Road, running from east to west. These roads divided the town into four quadrants, which were subdivided into ten plots of land each. This grid of the original town can still be seen on maps and aerial photographs of the area. At the center of town, where the two main roads met, a town hall was constructed where town meetings were held once a month.

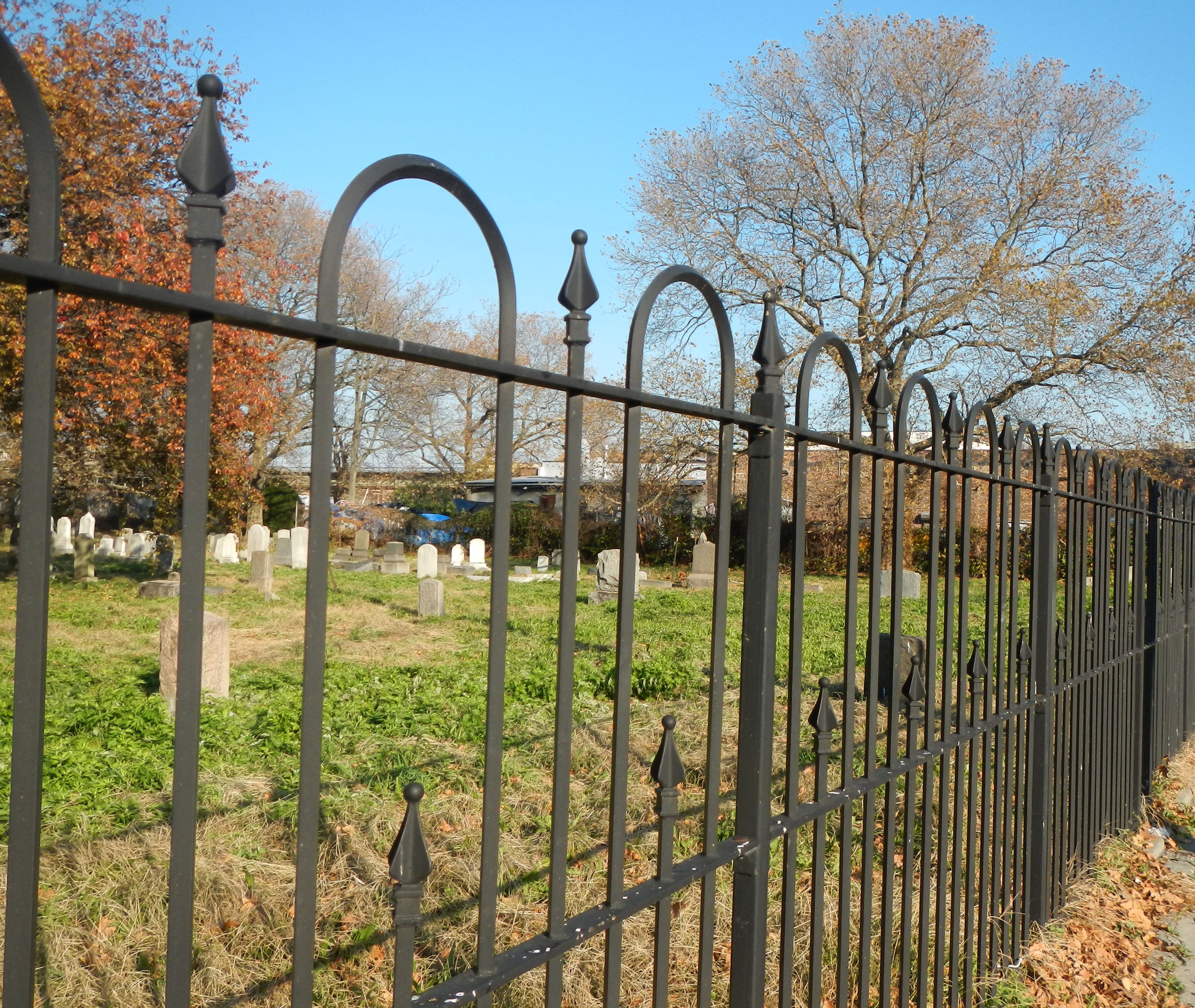
Old Gravesend Cemetery

The neighborhood center is still the four blocks bounded by Village Road South, Village Road East, Village Road North, and Van Sicklen Street, where the Moody House and Van Sicklen family cemetery are located. Next to, and parallel with the van Sicklen Family Cemetery is the Old Gravesend Cemetery, where Lady Moody is said to be interred. Egyptian émigré Mohammad Ben Misoud, who was part of a late 19th-century attraction at the Coney Island amusement park, was given a proper Muslim funeral upon his death in August 1896 and also buried in Old Gravesend Cemetery.

The religious freedom of early Gravesend made it a destination for ostracized or controversial groups, Nonconformists or Dissenters such as the Quakers, who briefly made their home in the town before being chased out by the succeeding New Netherland director general Peter Stuyvesant, who arrived in 1647. He was wary of Gravesend's open acceptance of "heretical" sects.

In 1654 the people of Gravesend purchased Coney Island from the local Lenape band for about $15 worth of seashells, guns, and gunpowder.

In August 1776 during the American Revolutionary War, Gravesend Bay was the landing site of thousands of British soldiers and German mercenaries from their staging area on Staten Island, leading to the Battle of Long Island (also Battle of Brooklyn). The troops met little resistance from the Continental Army advance troops under General George Washington then headquartered in New York City (at the time limited to the tip of Manhattan Island). The battle, in addition to being the first, would prove to be the largest fought in the entire war.

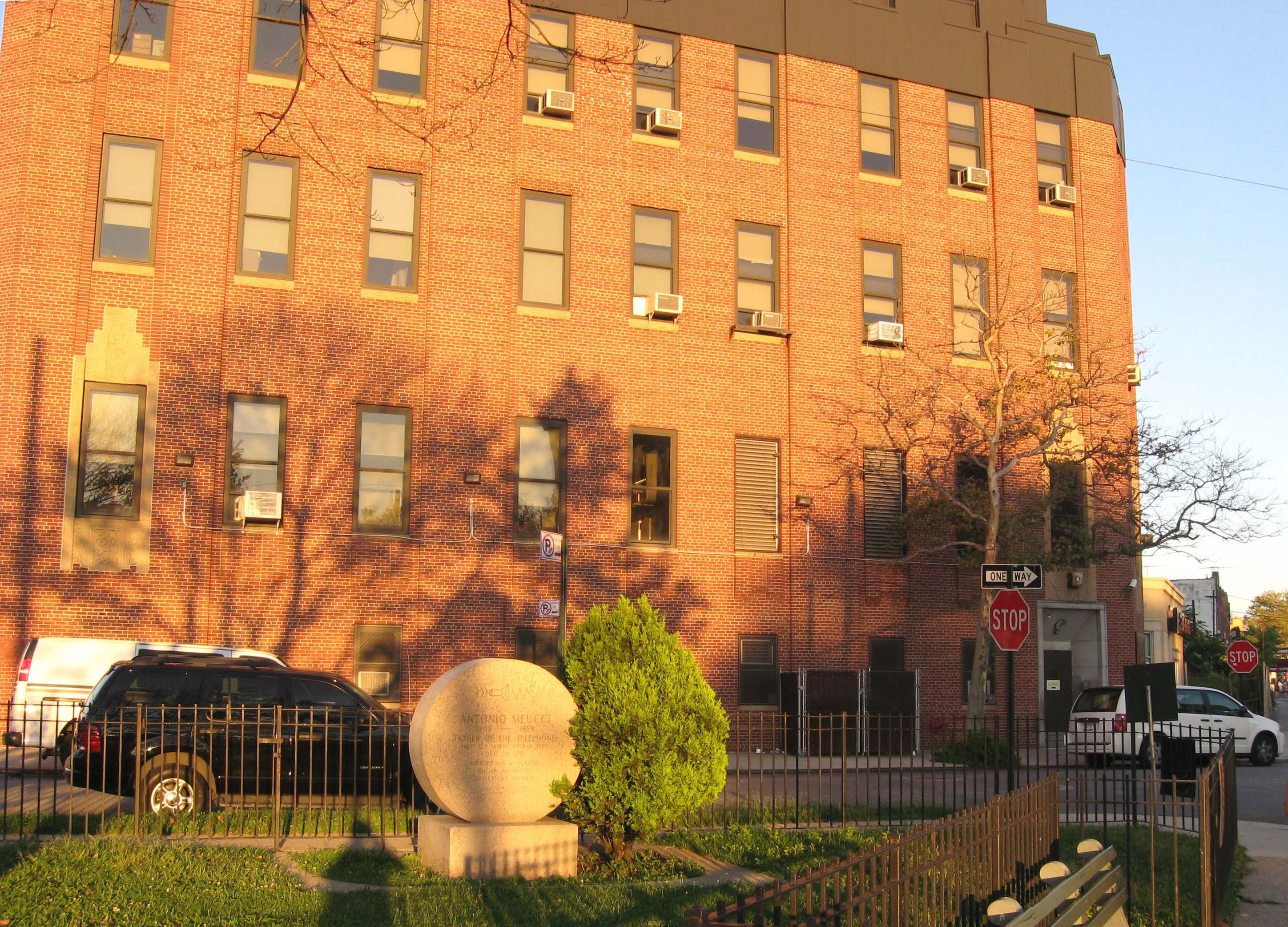
Art Deco Verizon building at Meucci Triangle, at 86th Street and Avenue U.

=== Popularity and success ===
Throughout the 17th and 18th centuries, Gravesend remained a sleepy suburb. With the opening of three prominent racetracks (Sheepshead Bay Race Track, Gravesend Race Track, and Brighton Beach Race Course) in the late 19th century, and the blossoming of Coney Island into a popular vacation spot, the town was developed as a successful resort community. John Y. McKane was credited with this. A Sheepshead Bay carpenter and contractor, he gained a variety of elected and appointed positions: as Gravesend town supervisor, chief of police, chief of detectives, fire commissioner, schools commissioner, public lands commissioner, superintendent of the Sheepshead Bay Methodist Church, head tenor of the church choir, and Santa Claus at the annual Sabbath school Christmas celebration. From the 1870s to the 1890s, McKane cultivated Coney Island, which was then part of the township of Gravesend, as a pleasure ground. He participated in both political and physical development.

As town constable, McKane expanded the Gravesend police force considerably and personally patrolled the beach. McKane became corrupt, using the pretense of town permits to extort tribute from every business, large or small, on Coney Island. Presenting himself as a champion of law and order, he skimmed much money from the many brothels and gambling parlors that thrived in his bailiwick. During McKane's reign Coney Island came to be known by many as "Sodom by the Sea".

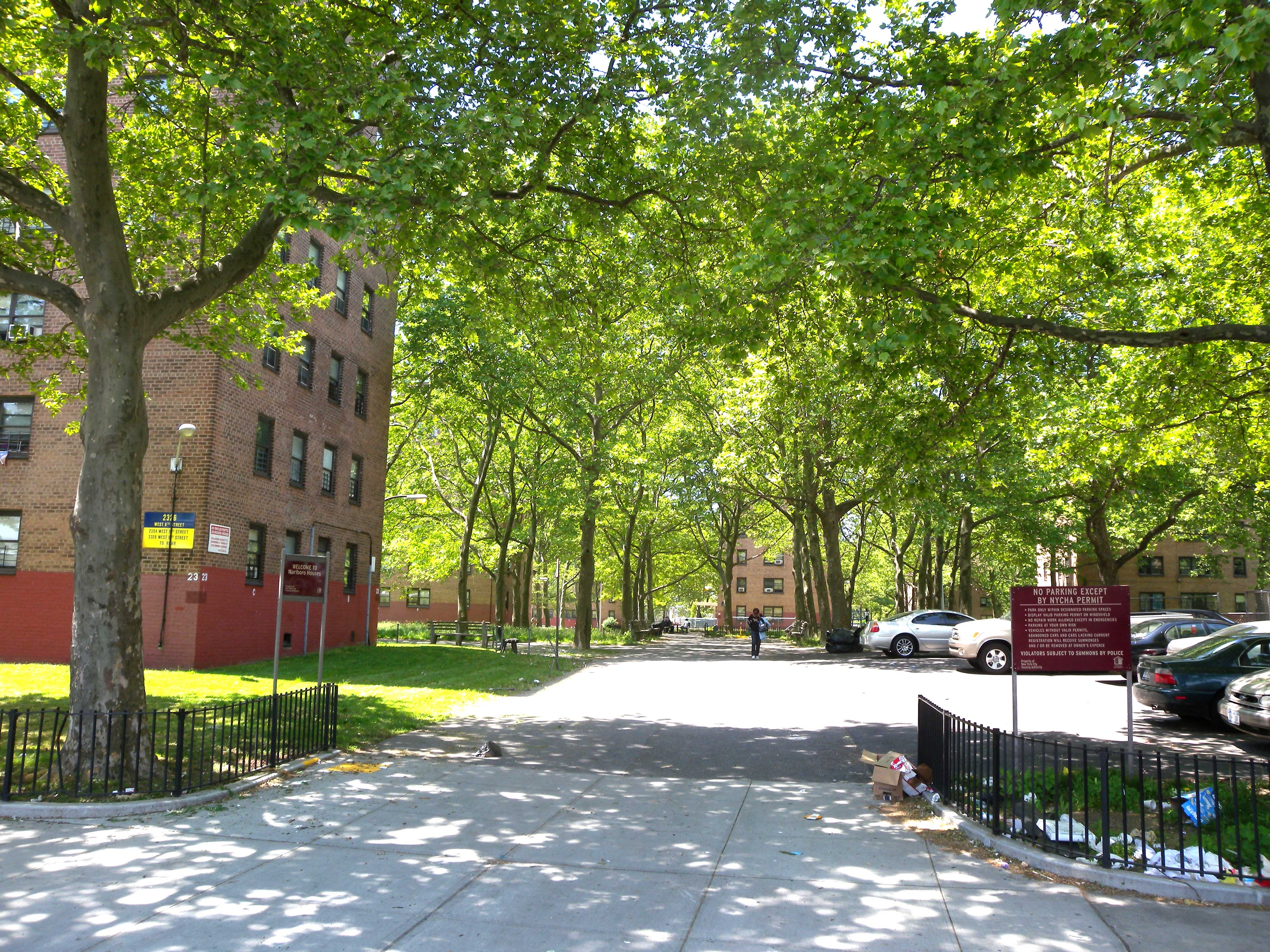
Marlboro Houses, a public housing project

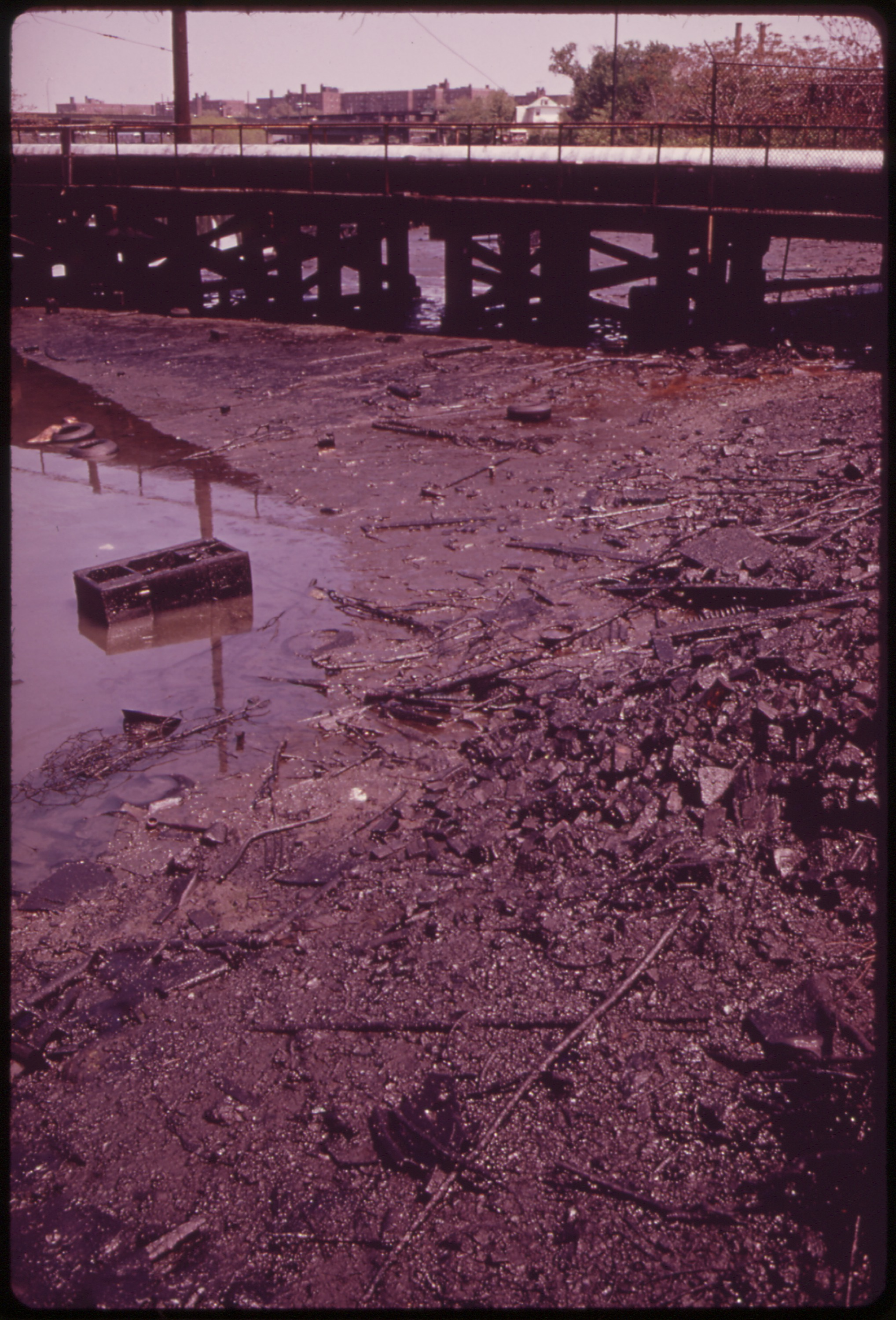
Oil-soaked 'Mud Lines Industrial Canal' in Gravesend Bay, 1973. Photo by Arthur Tress.

McKane became a Democratic Party ward boss and had loose standards on who was allowed to vote: immigrants, dead people, seasonal migrant workers, and criminals. Voting records show many specious entries. On the eve of the 1893 election, William Gaynor, a lawyer running for Brooklyn Supreme Court Justice, decided to test McKane's methods by dispatching more than 20 Republican observers to examine the Gravesend voter registries and oversee the voting in all six districts of the town, as he was entitled to do by law. However, when the observers reached Gravesend town hall at dawn on election day, McKane, along with a large group of policemen and cronies, confronted them. When the observers balked and produced injunctions from the Brooklyn Supreme Court, McKane supposedly declared "injunctions don't go here" and ordered the men away. A scuffle ensued and five of the observers were beaten and arrested. This event raised great outrage. Early in the following year, McKane was tried, convicted, and sentenced to six years in Sing Sing for such corruption. He was released near the end of the century and died of a stroke in his Sheepshead Bay home in 1899.

After McKane's fall from power, Gravesend and Coney Island were annexed in 1894 by the city of Brooklyn, which in turn became part of New York City in 1898. George C. Tilyou created one of Coney Island's first amusement parks, Steeplechase Park, the opening of which ushered in Coney Island's golden age.

Around the same time, Gravesend was the site of testing for the Boynton Bicycle Railroad, the earliest forerunner of the monorail. The BBR consisted of a single-wheeled engine that hauled two double-decker passenger cars along a single track; a second rail above the train, supported by wooden arches, kept it from tipping over. The engine and cars were four feet wide and were capable of speeds far greater than the much bulkier standard trains. In 1889, the BBR began running a short route between the Gravesend stop of the Sea Beach Railroad (near the intersection of 86th and West Seventh Streets) and Brighton Beach in Coney Island, a distance of just over a mile. Despite the smooth and speedy ride, the BBR ultimately failed and the test route fell into disuse, as did the Boynton train and its shed.

=== Later years ===
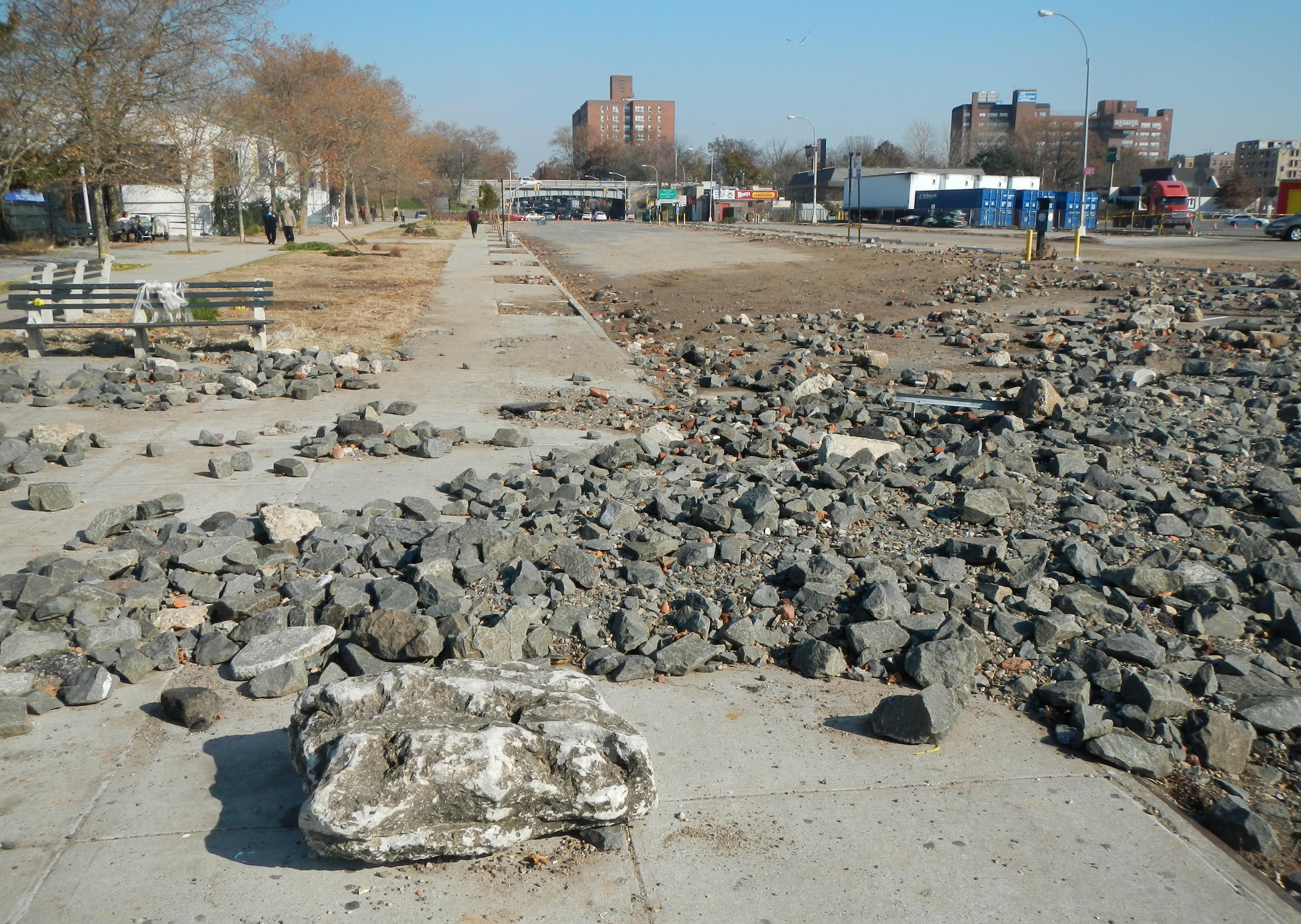
Gravesend in Hurricane Sandy's aftermath

Although Coney Island continued to be a major tourist attraction throughout the 20th century, the closing of Gravesend's great racetracks in the century's first decade resulted in the rest of the old town fading into obscurity. Most of it was developed as a working and middle-class residential Brooklyn neighborhood. During the 1920s, many one-family homes were built in Gravesend, which were then converted to two-family housing during the Great Depression.

In the 1950s, the city constructed the 28-building Marlboro Houses, public housing units run by the New York City Housing Authority, located between Avenues V and X from Stillwell Avenue to the Gravesend subway yards. Gradually this housing became occupied predominantly by African Americans. On the other hand, the area in the northeast part of Gravesend, bound by McDonald Avenue, Kings Highway, Ocean Parkway, and Avenue U, saw an influx of affluent Sephardi Jews (mostly Syrian Jews) during the 1970s. These residents built large Spanish Colonial-style houses, and had their own police force.

In 1982, an African-American transit worker named Willie Turks was beaten to death in Gravesend by a group of white teenagers. The relationship between the predominantly African-American and more poor population of the Marlboro Houses and the predominantly white surrounding neighborhoods continued to be tense through much of the 1980s. By 1986, crime was generally low in Gravesend, except for Marlboro Houses, where illegal drugs contributed to higher crime rates than in the rest of the neighborhood. On December 25, 1987, white youths beat two black men in the neighborhood in an apparent "unprovoked attack." In January 1988, to protest the specific attack and the general climate of racial violence, Reverend Al Sharpton led 450 marchers between Marlboro Houses and a police station, and were met with chants of "go back to Africa" and various racial epithets from a predominantly white crowd.

Beginning in the 1990s, the northeast section of the neighborhood was redeveloped with larger, upscale single-family homes, whose prices reached $1 million. This dramatically changed the composition of part of the neighborhood. In addition, some two-family homes were being converted back to single-family houses. Despite high rates of car thefts, Gravesend's crime rate remained relatively low.

== Education ==
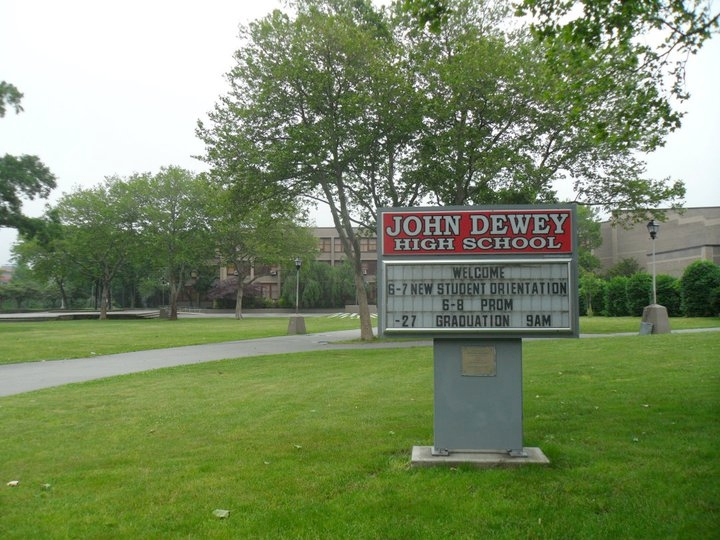
John Dewey High School's campus viewed from Bay 50th Street

=== Schools ===
- Big Apple Academy
- John Dewey High School
- Lafayette High School (now Lafayette Educational Complex)
- Touro College
- PS 95 The Gravesend
- PS 216 Arturo Toscanini
- PS 212 Lady Deborah Moody
- PS 721K Brooklyn Occupational Center
- IS 281 Joseph B. Cavallaro
- IS 228 David A. Boody
- Shostakovich School of Music
- PS 215 Morris H. Weiss
- PS 238 Anne Sullivan (Pre-K - 8)
- Our Lady of Grace Catholic Academy
- St Simon and St Jude Catholic School ( k-8) Jim McGinty
- PS 97 The Highlawn

=== Library ===
The Brooklyn Public Library's Gravesend branch is located at 303 Avenue X near West 2nd Street. It opened in 1962 and was renovated in 2001.

== Demographics ==
=== 2010 census ===
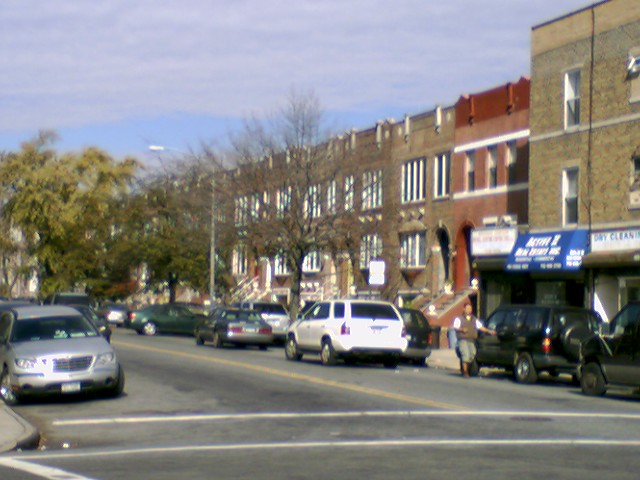
Dahill Road and Kings Highway

Based on data from the 2010 United States census, the population of Gravesend was 29,436, an increase of 179 (0.6%) from the 29,257 counted in 2000. Covering an area of 731.83 acres (296.16 ha), the neighborhood had a population density of 40.2 inhabitants per acre (25,700/sq mi; 9,900/km^{2}).

The racial makeup of the neighborhood was 52.8% (15,535) White, 21.2% (6,250) Asian, 8.4% (2,469) African American, 0.1% (41) Native American, 0.0% (1) Pacific Islander, 0.1% (41) from other races, and 1.3% (383) from two or more races. Hispanic or Latino residents of any race were 16.0% (4,716) of the population.

=== 2020 census ===
In the 2020 census data from NYC Dept. Of City Planning, West Gravesend showed there were between 20,000 and 29,999 white residents and 26,700 Asian residents showing both their populations to be almost equivalent and there were between 5,000 and 9,999 Hispanic residents. South Gravesend has between 10,000 and 19,999 white residents and has between 5,000 and 9,999 Asian residents, but showed each the Hispanic and Black populations to be under 5000 residents. East Gravesend overlapping to Homecrest showed a higher proportion of white residents of between 30,000 and 39,999 with Hispanic residents of between 5,000 and 9,999 and as well as Asian residents of between 5,000 and 9,999. The affordable housing NYCHA development Marlboro Houses located right on the borderline of Gravesend and Coney Island holds a significant concentrated community of Black residents even though some Asian and Hispanic residents also live within the housing development as well.

=== Historic demographics ===
Gravesend's earliest European settlers were predominantly English and Dutch. Slavery was legal in the colony, and many settlers had enslaved African Americans as workers until after the American Revolution, when New York gradually abolished the institution. African Americans continued to work and live in Gravesend after the abolition of slavery, clustering near the BMT Brighton Line at East 16th Street.

The now-defunct Gravesend Race Track opened on August 26, 1886, and hired mainly black workers, who tended to live nearby. Later, there was a surge in Irish, Italian, and Jewish residents, immigrants and their descendants who moved out from Manhattan. Chinese, Mexican, Ecuadorian, Dominican, Puerto Rican, Russian, Ukrainian and West Indian immigrants are the most recent residents to share this neighborhood. The largest group is thought to be Italian American and named for Gravesend's Italian community is a professional soccer team, the Brooklyn Italians who play in Gravesend's John Dewey High School football stadium. Of the Italian-American community, Sicilians (especially from Castellammare del Golfo), make up the largest specific region of people.

In 2008, The New York Times reported that the neighborhood had become particularly popular among Sephardic Jews. It was among several Syrian Jewish communities of the United States. The New York Times also reported that in the 2012 presidential election, a precinct in Gravesend was one of the few parts of New York City carried by Mitt Romney, with 133 votes to just 3 for Barack Obama.

== Housing developments ==
Housing developments operated by the New York City Housing Authority include Marlboro Houses, and two Mitchell-Lama Housing Program co-ops, Contello Towers II and Highlawn Terrace.

== Transportation ==
Gravesend is served by three New York City Subway corridors. The services and lines, respectively, are:

- D train on the BMT West End Line at 25th Avenue and Bay 50th Street;
- F and <F> trains on the IND Culver Line at Kings Highway, Avenue U, and Avenue X; and
- N and W trains on the BMT Sea Beach Line at Kings Highway, Avenue U, and 86th Street.

The Coney Island Subway Yard is in the neighborhood.

The B1, B3, B4, B64, B68, B82 and B82 SBS lines operate through Gravesend.

== Notable people ==
- William DeMeo (born 1971), actor
- John Franco (born 1960), former New York Mets baseball player
- Domenic Recchia (born 1959), attorney and politician

== Police ==
Gravesend is patrolled by the New York City Police Department's 60th, 61st, and 62nd Precincts.
