= Elfric Wells Chalmers Kearney =

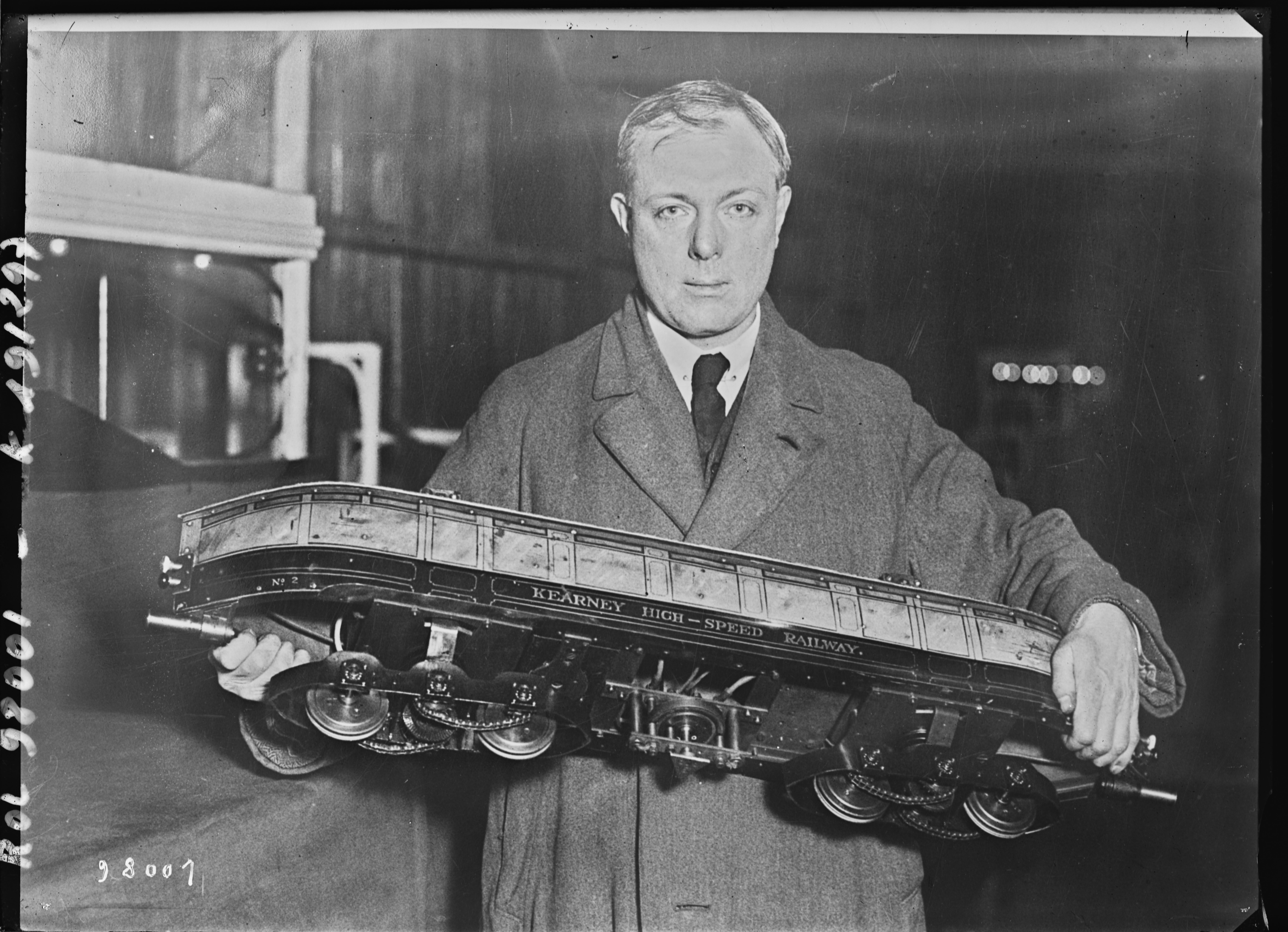
- Born: 3 February 1881; Geelong, Victoria, Australia
- Died: 15 April 1966 (aged 85)
- Other name: Chalmers Kearney
- Occupation: Railway engineer
- Known for: Promoter of monorail technology; author

Elfric Wells Chalmers Kearney (3 February 1881 – 15 April 1966) was an Australian inventor, engineer and author. Born in Geelong, Victoria in 1881, he spent most of his life in the United Kingdom. He was educated briefly at Ellesmere College, Shropshire during 1894 but left in October on account of ill health (he suffered chronic asthma and bronchitis).

His work focussed on railway engineering and he was managing director of the Kearney Railway Construction Company Ltd.

== The Kearney High-Speed Tube ==
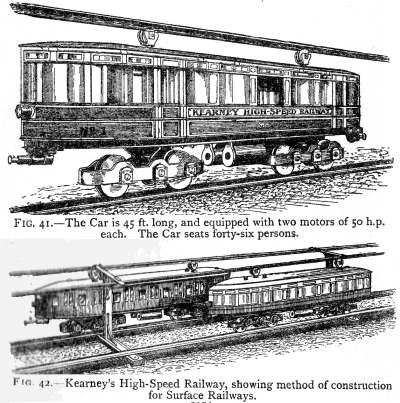
Sketches published in 1915 of Kearney's underground monorail system

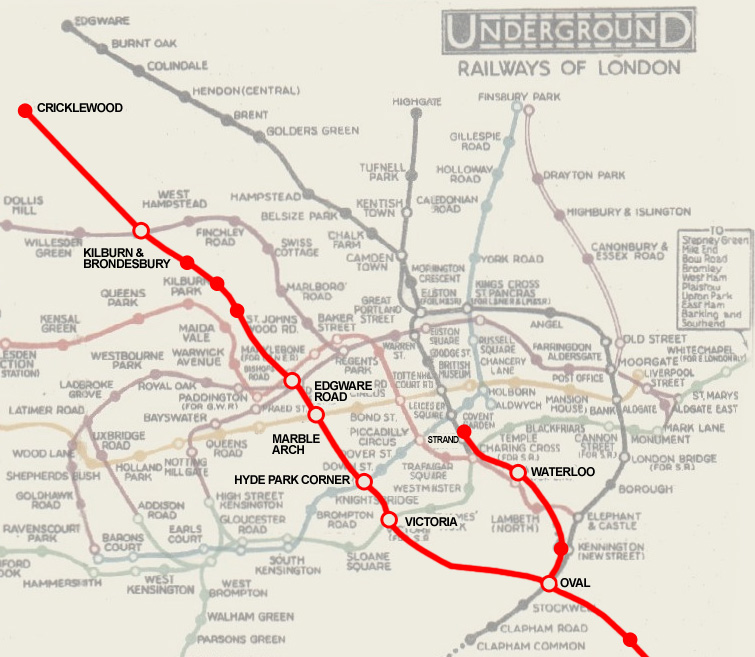
Kearney's unrealised plan for a Tube line across London

Kearney patented an innovative underground monorail railway system, the Kearney High-Speed Tube, which used the effects of gravity to enhance acceleration and deceleration and reduce power consumption with a "roller coaster" type of motion; from shallow sub-surface stations, deep-level tube tunnels would fall away at a 1-in-7 gradient, enabling underground trains to reach an estimated 60 miles per hour (97 km/h) before slowing down as they climbed to the next station. The trains were unusual in that they would run on a single rail with four double-flanged wheels under each carriage; wheels mounted on the roof would run along an upper guide rail above the train. This upper guide rail, along with the carriages' low centre of gravity and the gyroscopic effect of motion, would stabilise the train on the lower rail and reduce the side-to-side hunting oscillation, thus preventing derailments and allowing greater speeds.

At least two models of the system were built, in 1905 and 1908, including dramatic extremes such as 1-in-3 gradients and S-bends. Demonstration lines were planned at the 1911 Festival of Empire at Crystal Palace, in 1914 at the Aldwych in London, and a 1920 proposal between two hills in Brighton and Rottingdean. A full-sized carriage body was constructed by Brush Electrical Engineering Co. Ltd at Loughborough, which was apparently later destroyed by fire in suspicious circumstances.

Kearney founded the Kearney High-Speed Tube Railway Company Ltd, a venture which promoted the construction of a Kearney Tube system across London from Cricklewood and Strand to Crystal Palace. Although his proposals won support from the City of London Tradesmen's Club, they failed to win any parliamentary attention.

Kearney's London scheme made no progress, but he continued to promote — unsuccessfully — the Kearney High-Speed Tube system in other schemes around the world, including New York City, Boston, Toronto, a line between Venice and Venice Lido, and another between Nice and Monte Carlo. A 1919 scheme linking North Woolwich and Beresford Square, Woolwich, under the River Thames also failed. In 1922 he proposed an ambitious solution to the problem of crossing Sydney Harbour by rail with a Kearney Tube. In 1923, Kearney produced a proposal for a line linking Howard Street, North Shields and Palatine Street, South Shields under the River Tyne, which achieved strong public support. Kearney applied for a light railway order in November 1925, and the Minister for Transport granted a provisional order for the line, but the confirmation bill was rejected at the committee stage on opposition from Tynemouth Corporation. A later proposal by Kearney for a line linking the railway stations of each town in 1939, promoted in conjunction with the London and North Eastern Railway, failed due to the onset of World War II.

Before and during the War, Kearney lobbied for underground lines in several British cities, including Leeds (where plans advanced as far as discussions with the council), that were designed with longitudinal benches and the bottom rail flush with the floor, so that the tunnels could be used as air-raid shelters. Issues included that the design of the system, with stations close to the surface, presented a risk to shelterers in an air-raid, and the general lack of funds in wartime Britain.

The Kearney High-Speed Tube was an untried and untested technology, and no-one was prepared to run the risk of adopting his system. None of his schemes ever made it past the drawing board and the Kearney Tube idea faded away.

A model of the train is on display in the collections room of the National Railway Museum, York, England.

== Writing ==
Kearney was an active promoter of monorail technology, publishing leaflets and giving lectures on the subject, and wrote a book, Rapid Transit in the Future: the Kearney High-Speed Railway (1911). He later wrote a utopian science fiction novel, Erone (1943), which attempted to popularise the idea of monorail transport.

=== Bibliography ===
- Kearney, Elfric Wells Chalmers (1917). The Kearney High-Speed Railway. Society of Engineers. p. 356.
- Kearney, Chalmers (1945). Erone (4th ed.). The Commodore Press. p. 253.

== See also ==
- History of monorail
- Edgware Road Tube schemes
