= Big Apple Academy =

Location
- 2937 86th Street; Brooklyn; New York, NY 11223; United States; 40.591°N 73.975°W

Information
- School type: Private
- Religious affiliation: Non-sectarian
- Established: 1992
- Founder: Vlad Gorny
- President: Vlad Gorny
- Principal: Vlad Gorny
- Grades: K-8
- Gender: Coeducational
- Website: www.bigappleacademy.com

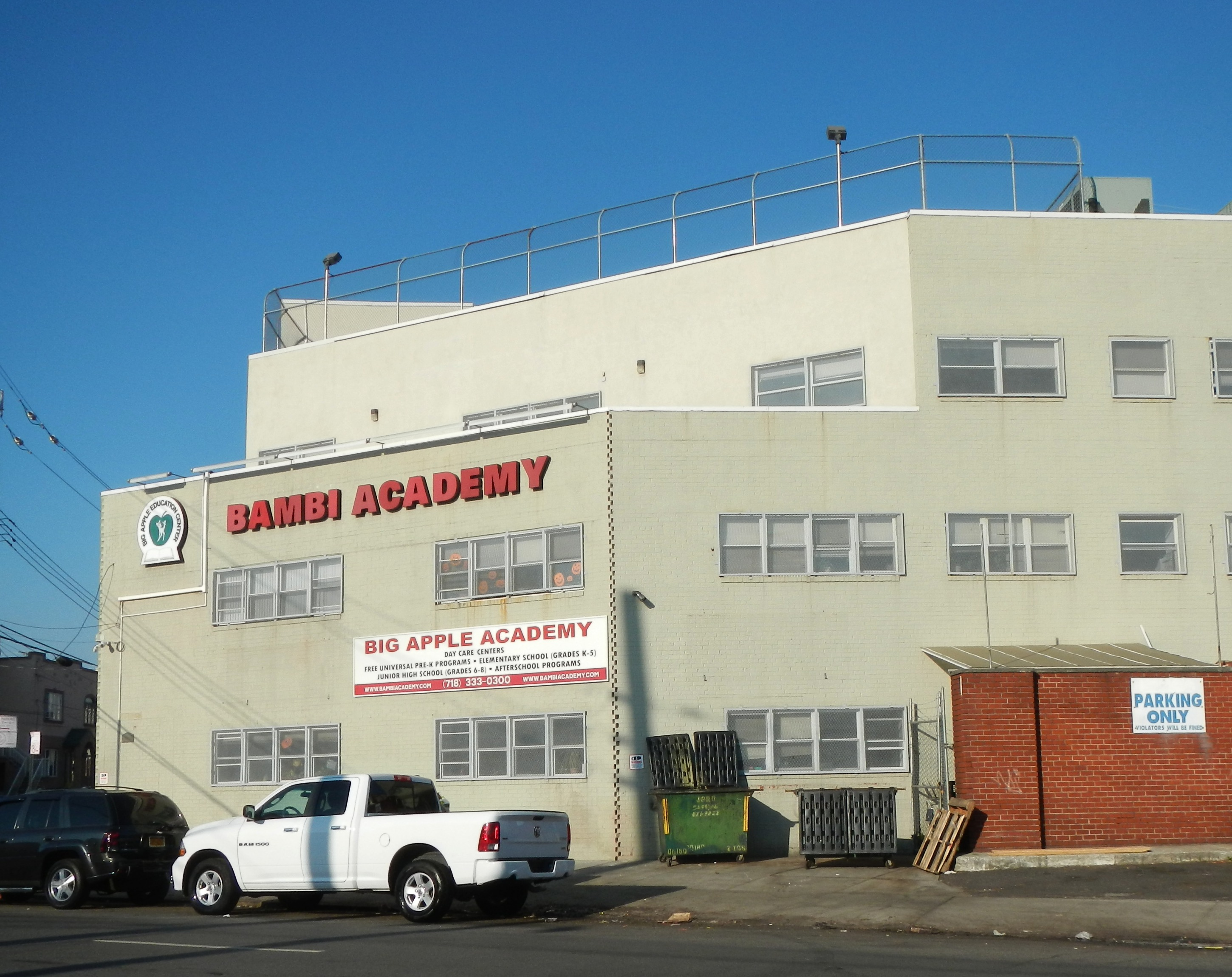
86th Street, Brooklyn

Big Apple Academy is a coeducational independent school for students in pre-kindergarten through 8th grade. The academy occupies two modern facilities located in the Gravesend area of Brooklyn, New York City.

== History ==
The Big Apple Academy takes its roots in the affiliated Bambi Academy, a Day Care Center founded by and oriented mostly towards Russian-speaking families. Due to the success of the program, the faculty decided to expand the institution's goals.

In 1992 the first kindergarten class was opened, and the school matured into a large educational center – the Big Apple Academy. The school created its own curricula, developed new teaching methods, and purchased equipment.

Today, the Big Apple Academy includes curricula for kindergarten through 8th grade.

== Transportation ==
Children are transported by school buses to and from the school. The boroughs of school bus coverage are Brooklyn, Queens and Staten Island.
