= Marlboro Houses =

Public housing development in Brooklyn, New York

- NYCHA Property
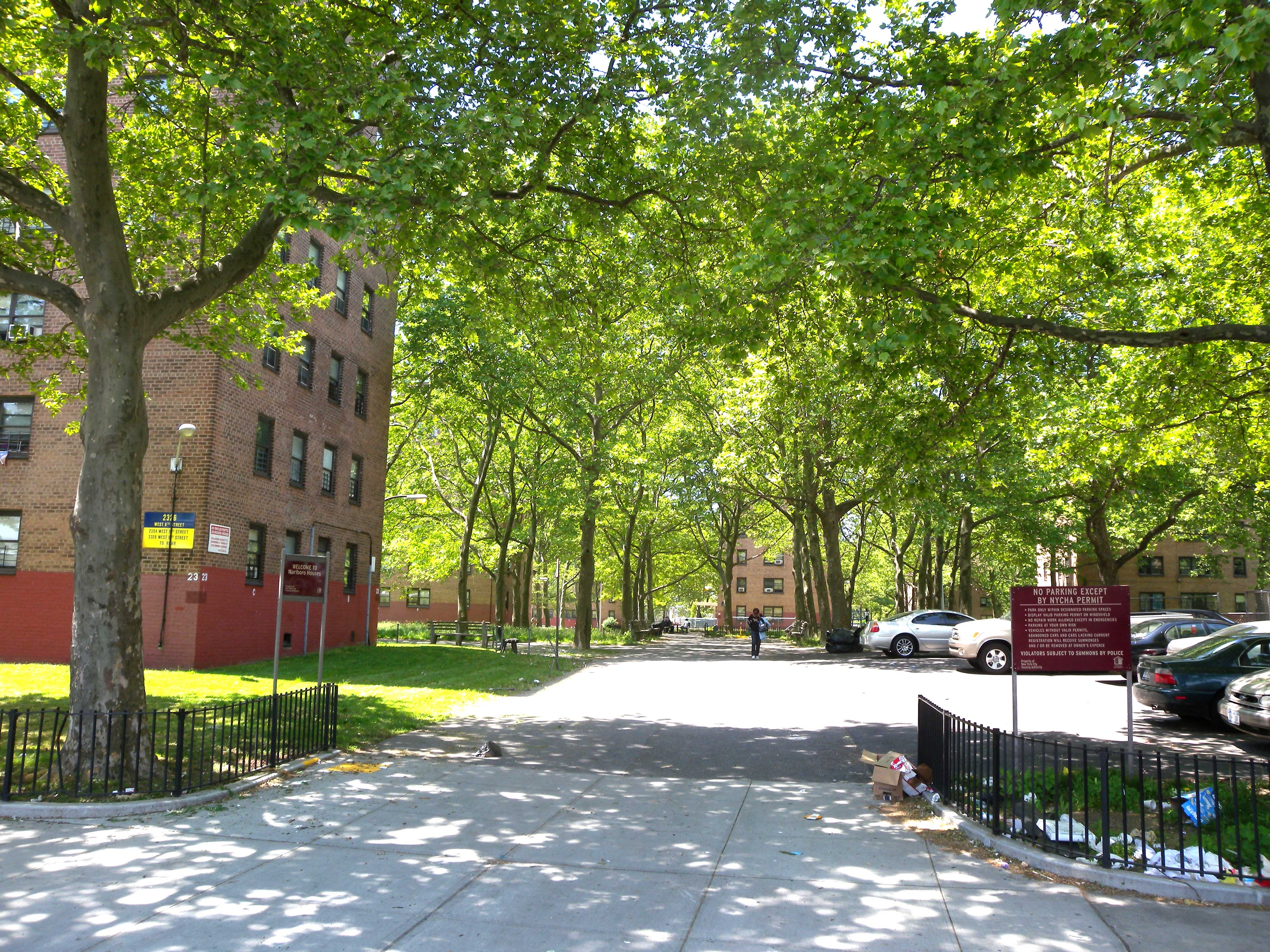
- Interactive map of Marlboro Houses
- Country: United States
- State: New York
- City: New York City
- Borough: Brooklyn

Area
  - Total: 33.54 acres (13.57 ha)

Population
  - Total: 3,614
- Zip Code: 11223

The Marlboro Houses are a NYCHA housing complex that consists of 28 buildings, the first three buildings are 16 stories tall while the rest (Buildings IV-XXVIII) are 7 stories tall. The complex is located between Avenue V/86th Street to Avenue W/X in the Gravesend neighborhood in Brooklyn.

== History ==
These buildings were completed in February 1958. The complex was designed by the architectural firm of Harrison & Abramovitz.

=== 21st Century ===
In February 2021, NYCHA requested a Technical Assistance Panel (TAP) from the Urban Land Institute to examine this complex, to be more resilient because of Hurricane Sandy in 2012 and its semi-coastal location, flooding risk, storm surges, and even heat exposures.

In mid-2024, New York City Mayor Adams and senior officials broke ground for a Marlboro Agricultural Education Center within this housing complex itself that has an area of 9,900 square feet (920 m^{2}), on top of that will be a greenhouse with healthy fruits and vegetables for $18.2M.

=== Demographics ===
According to the 2020 United States census, this housing project is listed on census tract 382 and it shows a very diverse racial population of 5,882 residents. There are 782 Hispanic residents at 13.3%, 1,754 Asian residents at 29%, 1,797 Black residents at 30.6%, and 336 White residents at 5.7%. The Asian and Black residents make up an almost equal amount within the tract. Though with the Asian residents within this census tract, many are spread out within the private houses and also inside the public housing development as well and continuing to grow as result of an ongoing spillover from the nearby continuously largely growing Chinatown in Bensonhurst/Gravesend. As these districts have been experiencing gentrification and rising rents, this has largely resulted in many working class income Chinese speaking renters from these districts lacking the property buying capital to consider applying for various affordable housing programs in the city including NYCHA and some were selected for an opportunity for the Marlboro Houses. The 2010 census showed this tract had 23% Asians, but rose to 29% in the 2020 census.

== See also ==
- New York City Housing Authority
