= Icarus paradox =

Neologism in economics

The Icarus paradox is a neologism coined by Danny Miller in his 1990 book by the same name. The term refers to the phenomenon of businesses failing abruptly after a period of apparent success, where this failure is brought about by the very elements that led to their initial success. It alludes to Icarus of Greek mythology, who drowned after flying too close to the Sun. The failure of the very wings that allowed him to escape imprisonment and soar through the skies was what ultimately led to his demise, hence the paradox.

== Overview ==
In many industries, extremely successful businesses often face problems maintaining their success. Of the companies in the 1966 Fortune 100, 66 no longer existed by 2006, 15 still existed but were no longer on the list, and only 19 remained on the list.

In a 1992 article, Miller noted that successful companies tend to fail precisely because of their strengths and past victories, which engendered over-confidence and lulled them into complacency. The characteristics that drove their success such as tried-and-true business strategies, dauntless and self-assured management, signature products and the reciprocal action and overall combination of all these elements when employed in excess may ultimately lead to declining sales and profits and even bankruptcy. This happens as managers make unwise decisions based on past strategies that they mistakenly believe will always be relevant and companies exploit as much as possible the strategies that contributed to their success, centralise their focus on the products that launched their brand and become blinded to changes in the external business environment.

== Reasons for failure ==
According to Miller, success seduces companies into failure through fostering overconfidence, complacency, specialisation, exaggeration, dogma and ritual.

Most successful firms owe their fortune to a unique competitive formula. As the company continues to grow, the manager's confidence in this winning formula is bolstered. Eventually, the firm ends up focusing only on refining and extending the strategies, products and values that propelled their success. Any other activities are neglected or even discouraged. This may be profitable in the short run as companies continue to specialise and improve in a certain product or strategy, leading to higher efficiency, sales and growth as they cultivate their competitive advantage in that particular area. In the long run, however, this attitude is unsustainable.

They become unable to keep up with the threats of new competitors, changing consumer demands, newly developed business models and changes in the external environment.

Some examples are Laura Ashley, Atari, Digital Equipment, Tupperware and Revlon.

=== Overconfidence and complacency ===
Failures in business projects happen all too often. Firms tend to invest too much and too long in activities that are elementally inoperative in its design or concept. Some examples are Merrill Lynch, RBS, AIG, Citibank, Lehman Brothers and Fresh & Easy. Most large capital investment projects come in late and over budget, never living up to expectations. Over 70% of new manufacturing plants in North America, for example, close within the first decade of operations. Around 75% of mergers and acquisitions do not pay off – the acquiring firm's shareholders lose more than the acquired firm's shareholders gain. The vast majority of efforts to break into new markets are abandoned within a few years.

Standard economic theory explains the high rate of failures as an inevitable result of companies taking rational risks in the face of uncertain situations. The rewards of a few successes outweigh losses incurred from many failures in the long run. Executives know this and accept the risk. This theory absolves them from blame – they were simply making rational risks after all.

Lovallo and Kahneman argue, however, that most of these failures are actually the results of flawed decision making. When predicting the outcomes of risky projects, executives easily fall victim to what psychologists call the planning fallacy. They make decisions based on delusional optimism instead of on rational weighing of gains, losses and probabilities. They spin scenarios of success while overlooking potential problems. Consequently, they pursue initiatives that are unlikely to succeed. Research into human cognition has traced this over-optimism to many sources.

==== Natural tendency ====
Humans have a native tendency to exaggerate their own talents, so many executives believe they are above average in their endowment of positive traits and abilities. This is amplified by the tendency to misperceive causes of certain events.

People tend to take credit for positive outcomes and attribute negative outcomes to external factors. A study of letters to shareholders in annual reports, for example, found that executives tend to attribute favourable outcomes to factors under their control, like corporate strategy or R&D programmes. Unfavourable outcomes were more likely to be attributed to uncontrollable external factors like the weather or inflation. People also tend to exaggerate the control we have over events, discounting the role of luck.

==== The illusion of control ====
Managers explicitly deny the role of chance in affecting the outcome of their plans. They see risk as a challenge to be met by their skills, and believe that results are determined purely by actions they and their organisation have taken. In making forecasts, they therefore tend to ignore or downplay the possibility of random, uncontrollable occurrences that may impede their progress towards a goal.

==== Anchoring ====
In making forecasts about a project, executives and their subordinates typically have a preliminary plan drawn up by whoever proposed the initiative, which is then adjusted based on market research, financial analysis or their own professional judgement, before deciding how to proceed.

This process has some serious pitfalls, however. The initial plan tends to accentuate the positive because as a proposal, it was designed to make the case for the project as compelling as possible, thus skewing the subsequent analysis towards over-optimism.

Anchoring can be especially pernicious when it comes to forecasting the costs of major capital projects. Executives often fail to build in enough contingency funds to cover overruns because they are anchored to their original cost estimates and do not sufficiently adjust them to account for possible delays, problems and expansions of project scope.

A study by Rand Corporation found that the construction costs of 44 chemical-processing plants owned by major companies such as 3M, DuPont and Texaco are, on average, more than double the initial estimates. Furthermore, about half produced less than 75% of their design capacity and a quarter produced less than 50%. Most plants had their performance expectations permanently lowered and the owners never realised a return on their investments.

==== Competitor neglect ====
In making forecasts, executives tend to focus on their own company's capabilities and plans and are thus prone to neglect the potential abilities and actions of rivals. Again, this results in underestimation of negative events such as price wars, overcapacity etc.

This is particularly destructive in ventures to enter new markets. When a company identifies a rapidly growing market well suited to its products and capabilities, it often rushes to gain a beachhead in it, investing heavily in production capacity and marketing. However, attractive pro forma forecasts of financial results that motivate this expansion rarely account for other competitors also targeting the same market. As all these companies invest at the same time, supply outstrips demand and the new market quickly becomes unprofitable.

==== Organisational pressure ====
Each firm has a limited amount of time and capital to be invested into new projects. There is intense competition for this time and money as individuals and units jockey to present their own proposals as being the most potentially lucrative. There are thus large incentives for these individuals and units to accentuate the positives in predicting outcomes. As a result, it ensures that forecasts used in planning are overoptimistic (which later distorts all further analysis). Also, it increases the odds that the projects chosen for investment are the ones with the most over-optimistic forecasts, and hence the highest probability of disappointment.

Other organisational practices also encourage over-optimism. For example, senior executives tend to stress the importance of stretch goals for their business units. This may increase motivation, but it also leads to unit managers further skewing their forecasts towards improbably rosy outcomes. Additionally, organisations may discourage pessimism, which is perceived as disloyalty. Other employees shun the bearer of bad news. Suppressing pessimistic opinions while rewarding optimistic ones will cripple an organisation's ability to think critically and analyse objectively.

=== Dogma, ritual and specialisation ===
There are perils associated with following a certain system, even a winning one, for too long. Clear commitments are required for initial success, but these commitments harden with time and ultimately constrain a firm's ability to adapt when its competitive environment shifts. As the market environment evolves, the fresh competitive formula that led to a firm's initial success instead becomes a rigid set of rules that dictate and confine their strategies. This dynamic can lead good firms to go bad, even when executives avoid arrogance and complacency.

To win in the market, executives must make a set of commitments that together constitute the organisation's success formula. A distinctive success formula focuses employees, confers efficiency, attracts resources, and differentiates the company from rivals. Five categories of commitments comprise the success formula:

- Strategic frames: What we see when we look at the world, including definition of industry, relevant competitors and how to create value.
- Processes: How we do things around here entailing both informal and formal routines.
- Resources: Tangible and intangible assets that we control which help us compete, such as brand, technology, real estate, expertise, etc.
- Relationships: Established links with external stakeholders including investors, technology partners or distributors
- Values: Beliefs that inspire, unify and identify us.

Although commitments are essential for initial success, they tend to harden over time. Initial success reinforces management's belief that they should fortify their success formula. With time and repetition, people stop considering alternatives to their commitments, and take them for granted. When the environment shifts, a gap can grow between what the market demands and what the firm does. Managers see the gap, often at an early stage, and respond aggressively to close it. But their hardened commitments channel their responses into well-worn ruts. The harder they work, the wider the gap becomes. The result is active inertia.

According to Sull's paper in 1999, active inertia – an organisation's tendency to follow established behavioural patterns – encompasses and details the ways success can eventually breed failure.

==== Frames become blinders ====
Strategic frames are the mind-sets that help managers evaluate how and what the business is doing, judge the market they are operating in, determine the importance of each segment of customers and decide on how to best increase the value of their firms.

Strategic frames provide focus and fit new information into a broader pattern. They help managers focus among the flurry of raw information they are bombarded with each day. Managers can see patterns in raw data by fitting them into a familiar information model. They can quickly judge the potential of new product ideas by seeing whether or not they fit in with the existing “style” of the company.

However, as the managers’ attention is drawn consistently to particular details and into certain frameworks, they eventually begin to believe that these are the only things that work and matter. Essentially, frames can constrict managers’ peripheral vision, blinding them to novel opportunities and threats. As their strategic frames grow more rigid, managers often shoe-horn surprising information into existing frames or ignore it altogether.

Consider NatWest Bank (National Westminster until 1995). At its foundation, National Westminster's executives committed to a clear set of strategic frames—retail banking is stagnant and UK suffering irreversible decline. The bank diversified into the US, Europe, Far East and Soviet Union and expanded into new financial services. When the Big Bank deregulation heightened competition, rivals such as Lloyds TSB refocused on their domestic retail business. NatWest, in contrast, responded by accelerating geographic and product diversification. Critics blasted NatWest throughout the 1990s for waiting too long to divest money-losing distractions until RBS acquired NatWest in 2000.

The evolution of the French military strategy in the first half of this century is a prime example. Initially, they emphasized attack, believing it to be the way to win against all odds. This strategy, however, wrought only disaster for them during World War I, leading France to adopt instead a purely defensive strategy. This is reflected in the construction of the Maginot Line to protect France's borders from invasion by Germany. Unfortunately, this defence proved futile in stopping the Blitzkrieg attacks. So in effect, the lessons they gleaned from World War I led them to tragedy in World War II.

As strategic frames become entrenched, companies keep fighting the way they did in the last "war".

==== Processes become routines ====
In the beginning, employees in a company will usually test out different ways of carrying out tasks until they find one that works exceptionally well. Once they do, they tend to lock into this one method and no longer try to find alternatives that may work better.

Sticking to a single process improves productivity and efficiency by freeing up employees' time and providing the stability and predictability needed to organize activities within a large, complex firm.

Over time, these routines resist change. With repetition, processes become second nature; people stop thinking of them as a means to an end, if they think of them at all. When the environment shifts, managers’ commitments to existing processes trigger an actively inert response.

Consider Compaq, which grew to sales of $3.6 billion in its first eight years supported by manufacturing processes that emphasized product quality. Its manufacturing routines prioritized quality over cost while the product development process placed greater emphasis on meeting product specifications than on minimizing development time and expenses. These practices contributed to Compaq's early growth during a period when customers placed greater importance on computer usability and lower-cost alternatives were less widely available. As personal computers became increasingly commoditized and competitors such as Dell gained market share, competition placed greater emphasis on value for money. Compaq's continued emphasis on quality and established manufacturing processes contributed to higher-priced products which faced increasing competition from lower-cost alternatives.

==== Resources become millstones ====
Specialized resources build competitive advantage that rivals cannot easily replicate. Shifts in the competitive environment, however, can devalue established resources.

Major airlines historically competed on the strength of their hub-and-spoke systems in which the carriers controlled valuable real estate at hub airports and a fleet optimised for this business model. The rise of low-cost upstarts such as Southwest and Ryanair depressed industry pricing and poached customers. Traditional carriers could not easily redeploy their hubs and planes to compete cost-effectively against new entrants.

==== Relationships become shackles ====
To be successful, consumers must build and maintain strong relationships with their various stakeholders – employees, customers, suppliers, investors etc. Managers commit to external relationships by investing in specialized facilities to serve a key customer, for example, or writing long-term service contracts. These relationships can make or break a company—think of Microsoft and Intel or Wal-Mart and Procter & Gamble.

Over time, however, maintaining these established relationships shackles a firm and limits its flexibility to act appropriately, especially when market conditions change. These relationships become shackles.

- Relationships with customers:

Companies cannot focus on new markets or on developing new products, as they need to maintain a good relationship with their existing consumer base. For example, in the 1980s, Kirin Brewery was slow to offer trendy dry beers, which were increasingly popular among younger drinkers, because they did not want to estrange their main market of Japanese businessmen. Consequently, Asahi Breweries beat them and became the new leader of the post-war Japanese beer market.

- Relationships with employees:

For example, Apple's relaxed and innovation-driven corporate culture had attracted some of the best engineers to work for them, who invented smashingly successful products. As computers became more commonplace, Apple had to keep costs down and market new products more quickly. This required discipline that Apple was reluctant to impose for fear of alienating their creative employees. Strict control deviated from Apple's corporate culture and the engineers were too comfortable to change their ways, hence making it difficult for managers to impose control and hindering it from responding to market changes more efficiently.

Another example is Banc One. Their strategy was to acquire local banks, retain the managers and grant them enough freedom to run their businesses. This encouraged the managers to be more entrepreneurial and attentive to environmental changes. As the banking industry was deregulated and consolidated, Banc One started to struggle. The high operating costs due to decentralisation made them inefficient, but Banc One was slow to standardise and centralise their back-office operations because they did not want to restrict the autonomy of the bank managers. Their performance only improved after their CEO, John B. McCoy, dropped the uncommon partnerships with the managers entirely.

- Relationships with external allies:

The Daewoo Group, which at its peak approached $20 billion in revenues and employed two hundred thousand worldwide before falling into bankruptcy. Daewoo owed much of its growth to cosy relationships with South Korea's General Park, who ruled the country with an iron fist for nearly two decades. Park supported Daewoo and other favored conglomerates with financing and tariffs. In exchange, Daewoo invested in industries targeted for expansion. When subsequent governments ended policies that favored the conglomerates, Daewoo's Chairman Kim tightened links with remaining friendly Korean politicians, and forged bonds with politicians in emerging markets such as Vietnam, the Sudan and Uzbekistan to replicate cozy relationships at home.

==== Values becomes dogmas ====
A company's values unify its people. Strong values can elicit fierce loyalty from employees, strengthen the bonds between a company and its customers, attract like-minded partners, and hold together a company's far-flung operations. These entrenched beliefs define how they see themselves and the firm. However, as companies mature, these values may become a rigid set of rules that oppress and not inspire.

For example, Polaroid's employees once prided themselves on the company's cutting edge innovations. It valued technological breakthroughs first and foremost. Other business activities such as marketing and finance were deemed unimportant as long as they were technologically up-to-date. Polaroid's managers then invested heavily in research, without considering changes in the consumer's tastes. Consequently, sales declined.

Shell is another company hindered by their values. In the 1930s, Henri Deterding, a Nazi sympathiser and strong leader dominated Shell. When he was finally forced out, the company grew distasteful of centralised management, leading to the rise of extremely independent country managers. While Shell's decentralisation allowed it to quickly grow globally, it also prevented Shell from quickly cutting costs and rationalising its operations when oil prices fell in the 1990s.

Also consider Laura Ashley who founded her company to defend traditional British values under siege from miniskirts. Laura Ashley's commitment to traditional values of modesty initially appealed to many women but lost their appeal as more women entered the workforce. The company, however, continued to pursue the old-fashioned designs that represents their fossilised core values, leading to their irreversible decline.

== The paradox of information systems ==
Drummond suggests in her paper in 2008 that computer-based information systems can undermine or even destroy the organisation that they were meant to support, and it is precisely what makes them useful that makes them destructive – a phenomenon encapsulated by the Icarus Paradox.

For examples, a defence communication system is designed to improve efficiency by eliminating the need for meetings between military commanders who can now simply use the system to brief one another or answer to a higher authority. However, this new system becomes destructive precisely because the commanders no longer need to meet face-to-face, which consequently weakened mutual trust, thus undermining the organisation.

Ultimately, computer-based systems are reliable and efficient only to a point. For more complex tasks, it is recommended for organisations to focus on developing their workforce.

A reason for the paradox is that rationality assumes that more is better, but intensification may be counter-productive.

=== The irrationality of rationality ===
Rationality means calculation of the most efficient means of accomplishing a particular end. Taylor's brand of rationality recommends the separation of the conception of work to its actual execution – the management assume control of work processes and methods and the employees simply carry out their given tasks. These tasks should be spliced into small portions requiring minimal training or knowledge to minimise costs and increase efficiency. This theory offers four benefits: efficiency, predictability, calculability and control. At some point though, irrationality of rationality sets in – a paradox whereby rational systems of production produce patently absurd results.

Specifically, using computers to control work processes and de-skill execution may be efficient, but beyond a certain point this becomes counter-productive as computers observe the law of diminishing returns

An information system becomes destructive when it undermines the organisational structure. This situation arises due to a mismatch between espoused theory and theory-in-use (i.e. practice).

=== How computers can be destructive ===
- Computers can only deal with well-structured problems.

As a result, complex cases are reduced to yes/no situations that computers can handle.

- Employees mindlessly follow the system.

This leads to a higher frequency of mistakes and lack of drive and motivation.

- Over-reliance upon computers in decision-making
- Information systems change how an organisation is perceived.

For example, banking is now perceived as commodities due to the internet, which forces banks to consider re-opening branches in order to re-establish their brand image.

=== Recommendations for practice ===
Computers become counter-productive where more nuanced work is involved. It is thus most important to establish the limits to which information systems should control a firm. Making optimal use of information technology does not mean using computers for everything. Until more intelligent technology is invented that can handle complexity, the most effective organisations are not the ones with the most advanced and comprehensive information systems but the ones that recognise the limits of their systems.

== Case studies ==
=== Fresh & Easy ===
A prime example of the Icarus Paradox at work would be Tesco's experimental venture into the U.S. market - Fresh & Easy. After making a loss of £1.2bn ($1.8bn), sending Tesco's net profit down 96%, Tesco decided to finally pull out of the U.S.. Fresh & Easy has around 200 stores in Arizona, California and Nevada.

They failed for several reasons:

- Tesco opened the chain in 2007 right before the subprime mortgage crisis hit, which severely adversely impacted consumer spending.
- Tesco did not expect online grocery shopping to be as popular as it was.
- Tesco's research misjudged the spending habits of their consumer base. While their Metro stores in the UK were popular, there was not enough demand for grab-and-go meals in the US. This is a new concept in the US where, unlike in Europe, most people would usually order take out or cook their own meals. Purchasing such meals are also more expensive for customers than buying groceries and cooking meals themselves.
- In the US, most shoppers only buy their groceries once a week, and they do so in bulk and purchase a large variety of products, while Europeans tend to make more frequent, but smaller trips to the grocery stores.
- According to Marc Levinson, author of "The Great A&P and the Struggle for Small Business in America", Fresh & Easy was not unique and had flaws that Tesco had no time to fix due to shareholder pressure. He also believed that Tesco had an inaccurate model of the US market and underestimated the effort required to adapt to changes in said market.
- "It (Tesco) was engaging in hubris, and that brings arrogance. You lose touch with your customers," said Clive Black, an analyst from Shore Capital in London watching Tesco. He believes that the US market was simply too different from the UK and that Tesco's aggressive geographical expansion strategy only detracts from their focus in the changing UK market.

In Fresh & Easy's case, TESCO's confidence in bringing its successful concept of ready meals to the US market contributed heavily to its failure. The intensive marketing required to change people's daily consumption habits take time and money, neither of which TESCO invested enough of. TESCO was also confident enough to continue to hang on for over 5 years despite indications of possible failure - In 2009, Fresh&Easy made a loss of £142m, up from £62m in 2008. This is a case of overconfidence and specialisation leading to the demise of a potentially successful business.

=== Firestone Tire and Rubber Company ===
Firestone Tire and Rubber Company was a leading player in the US tire industry, but failed to meet the challenge of change because they did not act appropriately. Entering the 1970s, Firestone had enjoyed 7 decades of uninterrupted growth. Their main rival was Goodyear, also based in Akron, Ohio, and a few other leading US tire producers. Firestone saw their challenge as simply keeping up with the steadily increasing demand for tires.

Strategy:

- Strong company culture and loyalty:

Harvey Firestone Sr. promoted the idea of a "Firestone family" that included both customers and employees. The company operated a country club open to all employees regardless of rank, and Firestone maintained close relationships with executives at major automakers.

- Focus on maximising output:

The company's operating and capital allocation processes were designed to maximise output and exploit the booming demand for tires. In the capital-budgeting process for examples, frontline employees identified market opportunities and translated them into proposals for investing in additional capacity. Top executives then speedily approves recommendations made by middle managers regarding the most promising proposals.

Firestone faced manufacturing delays and quality issues when attempting lines for radial tire production. At the same time, radial tires lasted longer, which reduced replacement frequency and caused total US tire demand to flatten. However, Firestone maintained open factories and continued producing excess inventory. The company also relied on internal promotion by 1972, all top executives were internal hires, and one-third were second generation Firestone managers.

However, Firestone failed to respond effectively to radial technology due to their routinised system. They attempted to tweak their existing processes to allow for radial manufacturing, thereby causing production and quality problems. As US demand for tires plateaued, mainly due to radial tires lasting longer than conventional tires, Firestone's CEO stubbornly assumed that demand was ever-growing and made no move to close plants. They made tires for which there was not enough demand because their budgets encouraged excessive investments in capacity, driven by frontline managers who did not want their own plants to close. Additionally, Firestone was shackled by its relationships with its employees. Its loyalty-focused hiring and promotion process resulted in Firestone failing to recruit newcomers to introduce fresh opinions. Even as the market environment changed, Firestone insisted on hiring “people like us.” In 1972, all its top managers had never worked anywhere else and one-third continued their father's legacy as Firestone executives.

By 1979, Firestone was in deep trouble. Their plants were running at 59% capacity and they started renting warehouses to store unsold stocks. They also made costly product recalls that damaged their reputation. Firestone's domestic tire business lost over $200m in cash. Eventually, Firestone lost most of their market share to foreign firms and went through two hostile takeover bids before Bridgestone finally acquired them in 1988.

=== Laura Ashley ===
The company was started in 1953 with a vision of re-creating the British countryside. Their style referred to the romantic image of English ladies tending roses at their country manors, and it resonated with many women in the 1970s. The business rapidly expanded from a single silk-screen press to a major retailer with 500 shops and a globally famous brand. Laura Ashley expanded her business not for profits, but to protect and promote British values, which she felt were threatened by sex, drugs and miniskirts in the 1960s. She exercised tight control over her business – design, manufacturing, distribution and retailing were kept in-house. In 1985, Laura died and her husband, Bernard, continued the company on the same course his wife had set.

Fashion, however, evolved. As more women entered the workplace, they began to prefer more practical styles over Laura Ashley's romantic garb, which was dismissed as suited to milkmaids in the 1880s rather than CEOs in the 1980s. Apparel manufacturing was also transformed by the fall of trade barriers – fashion houses were moving production offshore or outsourcing it entirely in order to cut costs.

However, Laura Ashley continued with the out-dated designs and expensive production processes that had served it so well in the past.

By the late 1980s, an external consultant outlined remedial actions to overcome the challenges Laura Ashley was facing. Bernard brought in new CEOs to restructure the business to increase sales and cut costs. Unfortunately, none of the many plans were bold enough in recasting the company's image and strategy. Laura Ashley stuck to its traditional values and it remained unclear whether Laura Ashley was a manufacturer, retailer or brand.

Laura Ashley was by then afflicted with active inertia. It changed CEOs 6 times in 10 years, yet its decline continued.

=== Xerox ===
Xerox is a case study on how strategic frames can blind the management from changes in the market environment.

In the 1970s, Xerox's management analysed the market and singled out IBM and Kodak as their main competitors. This mind-set helped Xerox defend its market share. However, Xerox was so focused on IBM and Kodak that it ignored the threat of new entrants: Canon, Ricoh and Sevin. These newcomers targeted the lower-end market and niche segments to sell their high-quality copiers, surely establishing their positions.

Xerox's manufacturing process, and hence product prices, were costly and the quality of their products were subpar relative to the competition. It also suffered from its highly autocratic management. As a result of this, return on assets fell to less than 8% and marketshare in copiers came down sharply from 86% in 1974 to just 17% in 1984. Between 1980 and 1984, Xerox's profits decreased from $1.15 billion to $290 million.

In 1982, David T. Kearns took over as CEO and quickly launched initiatives to hedge their share losses – cutting costs and reinforced quality control through its benchmarking program – and was successful.

However, it then became so focused on battling the Japanese that Xerox was unprepared to fight the upcoming war waged for the personal computer. While Xerox's Palo Alto Research Center pioneered several technologies that impelled the rise of the personal computer (the mouse and the graphical user interface), Xerox did not grab the new opportunities this posed as they were outside its strategic frames.

== See also ==
- Progress trap
- Winner's curse
- Dynastic cycle
