= History of monorail =

The term monorail or industrial monorail is used to describe any number of transport systems in which a car or carrier is suspended from, or rides on, an overhead rail structure. Unlike the well-known duo-rail system, there are many rail-guided transport options which have been described as monorails, so that tracing the history presents a demarcation problem regarding what should be included and what should be omitted.

Common usage appears to define a monorail as any rail-guided vehicle which does not employ the coning action of conventional adhesion railways to achieve directional stability. This would exclude rack railways and funicular railways. Another generally accepted rule is that the guideway or track must be narrower than the car/vehicle. Elevated, supported, cable propelled systems like the Cable Liner and MiniMetro are generally not considered to be monorails.

Bearing in mind the pattern of development of conventional railways, different criteria and measures of effectiveness were relevant at different times, and alternative design solutions were proposed. Hence, a monorail of the early 19th century bears little resemblance to current designs, and was optimized for different performance objectives, within different technological constraints.

== Early developments ==
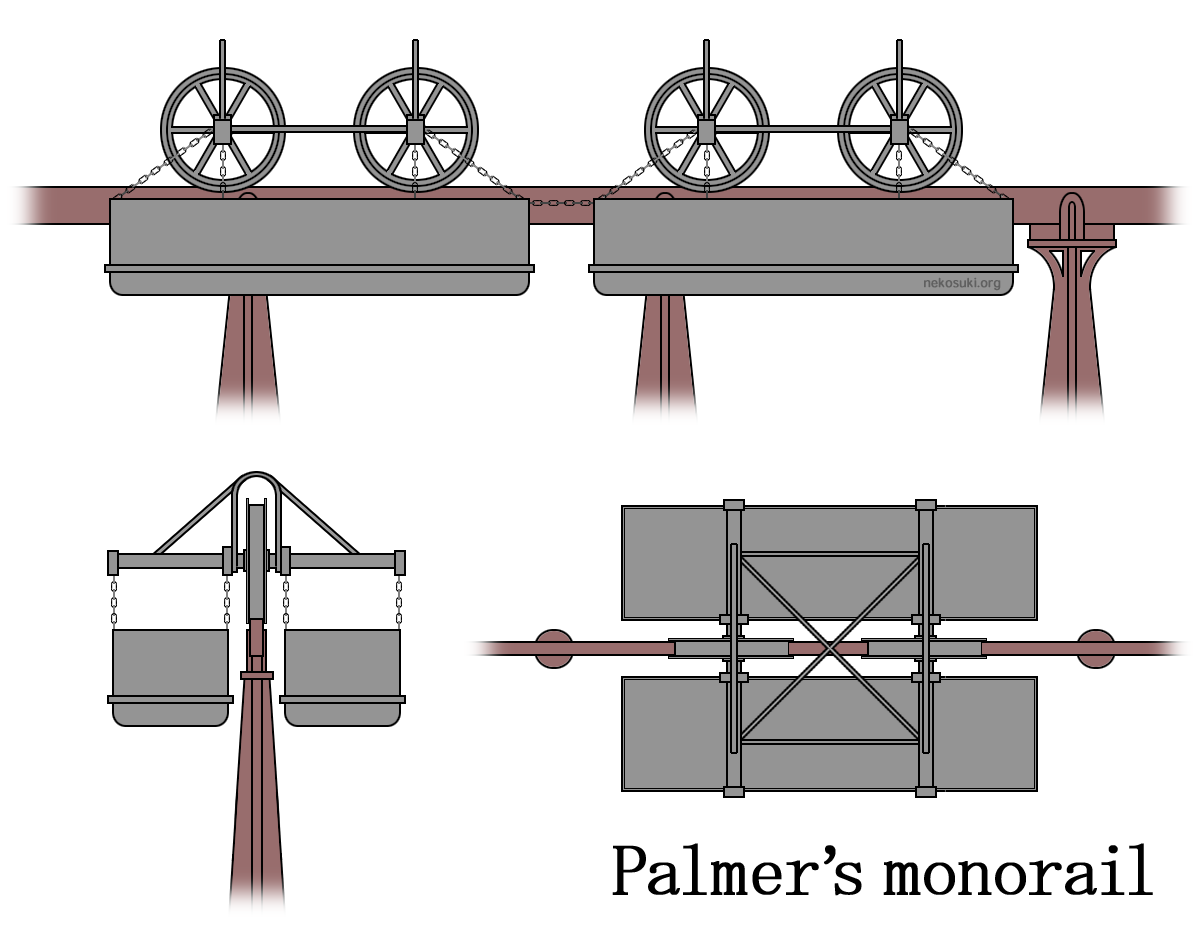
Palmer's monorail.

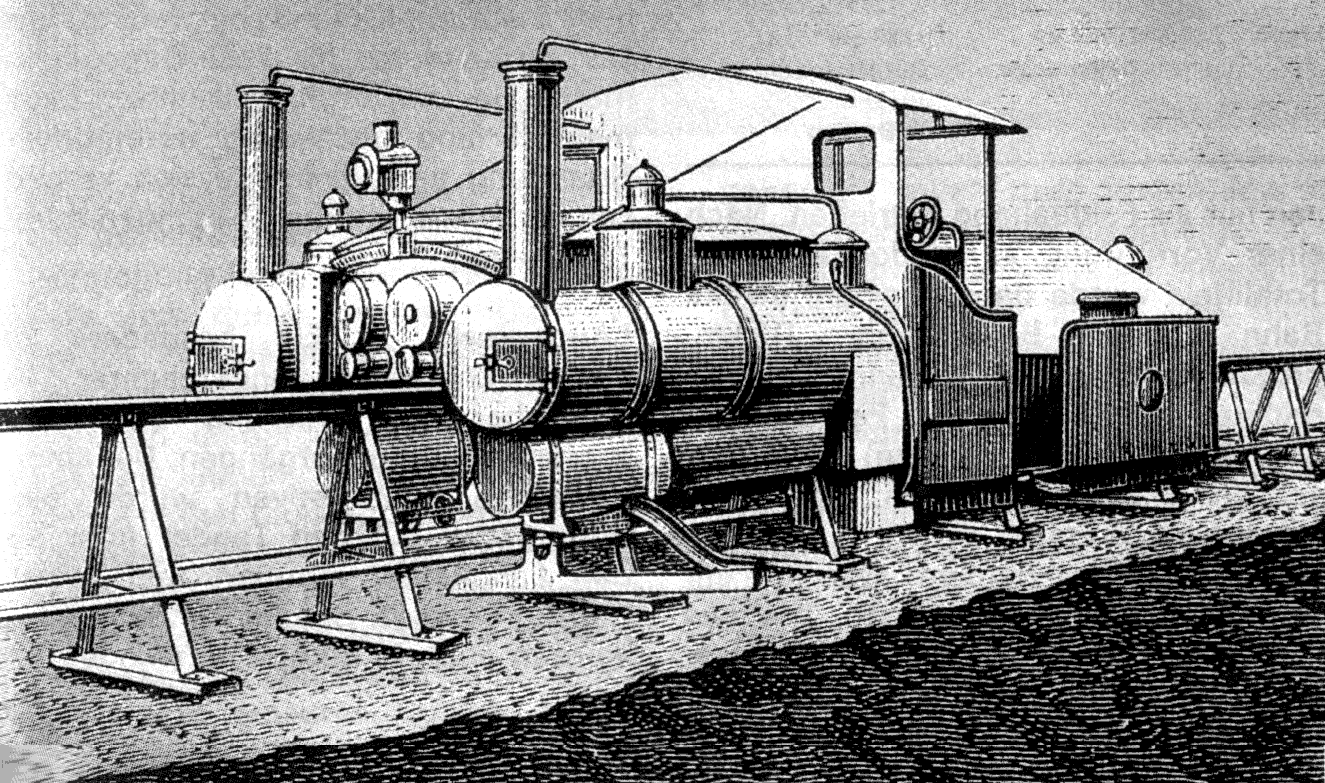
The Lartigue monorail

The earliest patent for a vehicle designed to run on a single rail can be traced to UK patent No 4618 dated 22 November 1821. The inventor was Henry Robinson Palmer, who described it as 'a single line of rail, supported at such height from the ground as to allow the centre of gravity of the carriages to be below the upper surface of the rail'. The vehicles straddled the rail, rather like a pair of pannier baskets on a mule. Propulsion was by horse. A line was built in 1824 in the Deptford Dockyard in London, and in 1825, another line was built in Cheshunt, Hertfordshire. Dubbed the Cheshunt Railway, this line made history as it was the world's first passenger-carrying monorail, and the first railway line to open in Hertfordshire. In 1826 a company was formed to construct a line between Barmen and Elberfeld in Germany, but construction never started.

Throughout the 19th century, the Palmer design was improved, with the addition of stabilising wheels and additional rails (rendering a misnomer of 'monorail'). In 1829, Maxwell Dick introduced 'safety rails' below the running rails to reduce the likelihood of derailment. He also articulated the main advantage claimed for this class of vehicle: 'the pillars or supports to be of different heights as circumstances of the country may require'. In other words, the system was better suited for crossing rough terrain.

In 1868, William Thorold M.I.C.E. presented a paper proposing a monorail system that could be built at ground level in or alongside roads. The Patiala State Monorail Trainways and Kundala Valley Railway were built in India on the principle that he described.

In 1869, J Haddon built a monorail in Syria to replace a mule train in military use. This embodied lateral guide rails, but was basically a pannier design hauled by a locomotive having double vertical steam boilers.

General LeRoy Stone demonstrated in 1876 his Centennial Monorail for transporting passengers, but failed to exploit the concept also on the Bradford and Foster Brook Monorail, and this was closed after only one year due to a lethal boiler explosion in 1879. Around 1879, Joseph Stringfellow devised a similar "one-rail" system for possible use as a "cheap railway" in Australia.

By the end of the 19th century, the main proponents for the monorail were Charles Lartigue and F. B. Behr. Lartigue constructed Palmer monorails in Algeria to transport esparto grass, to replace mules and camels, although the motive power is recorded as 'animal'. He also demonstrated his ideas in Paris (1884), Westminster (1886), Tours (1889), St Petersburg (1894), Long Island (1894) and Brussels (1897). Behr proposed a high speed monorail between Liverpool and Manchester, but construction never started through lack of financial support.

The most famous Lartigue monorail was the Listowel and Ballybunion Railway, in Ireland, which stayed in service from 1888 until 1924. Part of this railway survives as a preserved railway and tourist attraction.

The last Lartigue design was built in 1924 between a magnesium mine at Crystal Hills, about 100 mi (160 km) north of Los Angeles, and a railhead in Trona, California. This used petrol driven locomotives, and mounted the rail on a set of wooden A frames.

== Suspended and bicycle railways ==
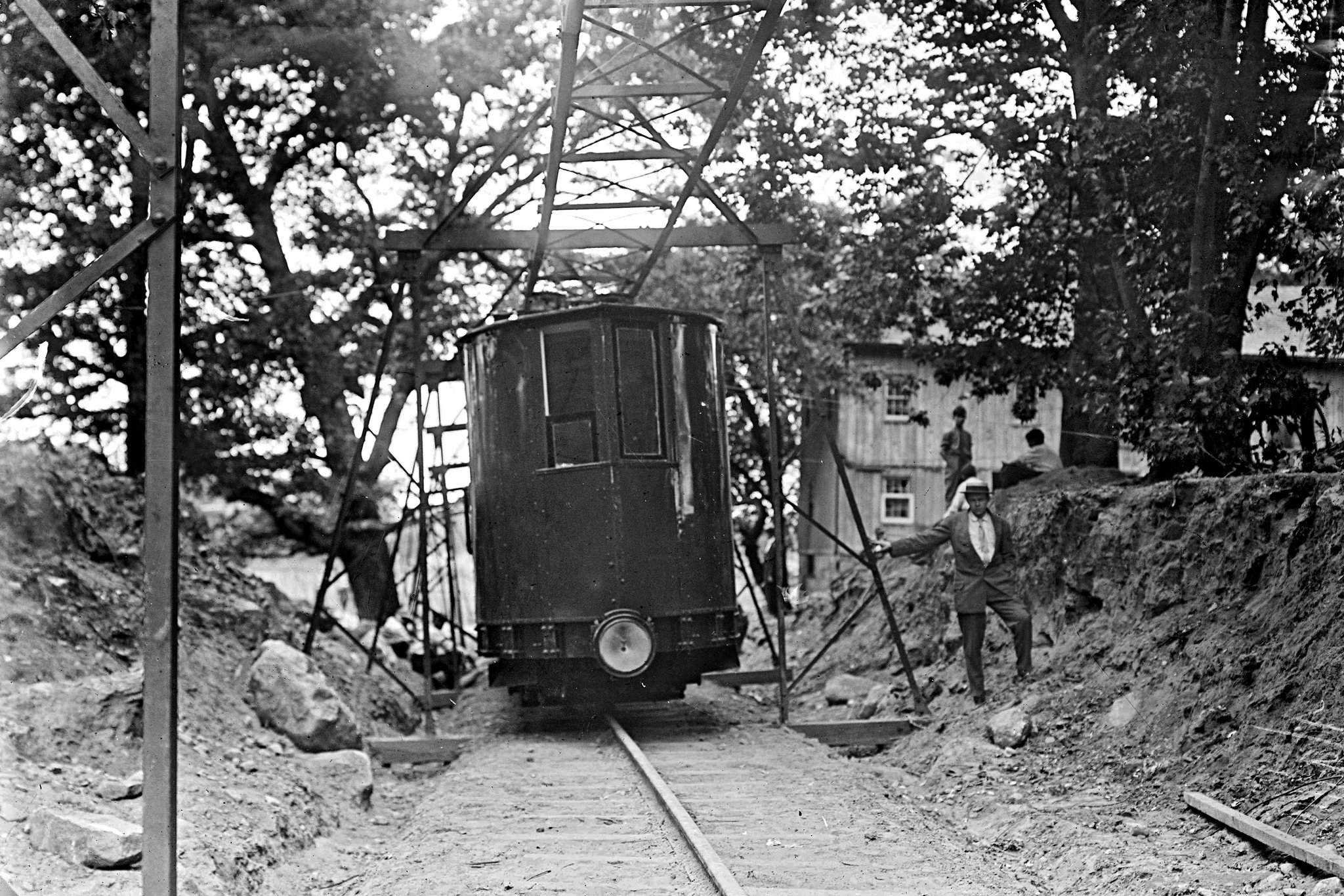
Pelham Park and City Island Railroad, believed to be c. 1910

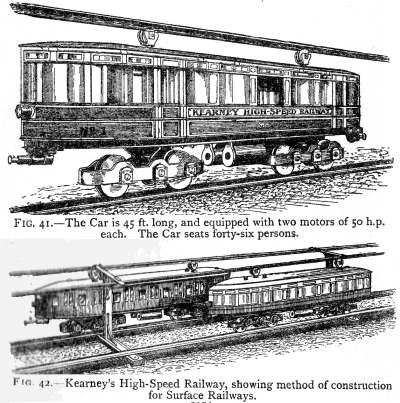
The Kearney High-Speed Railway

In 1886, the Enos Electric Company demonstrated a suspended monorail on the grounds of the Daft Electric Light Company in the Greenville section of Jersey City, New Jersey, which was closer in its appearance to more modern monorails, but the most famous suspended monorail of this era was Eugen Langen's 'Schwebebahn', or floating railway, of Wuppertal, which entered service in 1901, and is still in daily use.

The Wuppertal monorail follows the Wupper Valley where a conventional railway is quite impractical. The suspended monorail, like the Palmer monorail appears a potentially superior solution over rough and mountainous terrain, but since the majority of the track is over more favourable territory, it only rarely offers an overall better solution. Short sections in mountainous areas, such as a system built for the Ria Copper Co. by Siemens in the Pyrenees, seem to be the niche for this type of monorail. This particular example used a form of regenerative braking, such that the electricity generated by the full descending trucks was sufficient to drive the empty trucks back up the mountain.

In 1890 the Boynton Bicycle Railroad was built in Long Island. Designed by Jose Ramon Villalon, who would later become one of Cuba's greatest statesmen, this railroad ran on a single rail at ground level, but with an overhead stabilising rail engaged by a pair of horizontally opposed wheels. The railway operated for only two years, but the design was adopted elsewhere.

In 1908, Elfric Wells Chalmers Kearney (1881–1960) designed a monorail having an overhead stabilizing rail with spring-loaded vertical stabilizing wheels, but although a car was built, it never saw service.

From 1910–1914 a monorail system designed by Howard H Tunis was used on the Pelham Park and City Island Railroad in the Bronx, New York City. On the first trip of the monorail, the vehicle, with the inventor at the controls, slipped off the supporting lower rail. Though some of the New York newspapers erroneously reported that the accident was a major catastrophe, that is not so, and only one passenger on the car claimed a minor injury. The car was quickly repaired and the monorail operated safely on a regular basis from 1911 until 1917, when it was dismantled as the United States entered World War I, because the terminal near City Island was requisitioned. A propeller-driven suspended monorail, claiming the speed of aircraft with the safety and reliability of railways was designed by George Bennie in 1926, and named the 'Bennie Railplane'. A demonstrator was built near Glasgow in 1929, but the system did not progress further in the UK.

Russia worked on a system similar to the Bennie Railplane in the 1930s and were even planning a 332 mi (534 km) line through Turkestan with a top speed of 180 mph (290 km/h). Their system was unique in that it had two side by side cars suspended on one rail, and it could actually dismount from the rail to cross rivers as an amphibian and then on the other side remount the rail. And while elements of this system were tested in Moscow, the Russian government instead built a conventional rail system.

== The gyro monorail ==
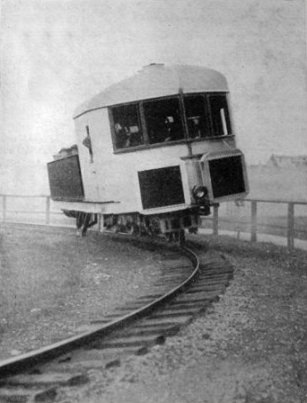
Brennan's Monorail

Perhaps the only true monorail was the Gyro Monorail developed independently by Louis Brennan, August Scherl and Pyotr Shilovsky. This was a true single track train which used a gyroscope-based balancing system to remain upright. All were demonstrated by full-scale prototypes, but development was effectively stopped by the First World War. Brennan's design was given serious consideration for the North-West Frontier of India, and a Shilovsky monorail was proposed by the USSR government between Leningrad and Tsarskoye Selo in 1921. Funds ran out shortly after construction began.

In the early 1930s, New York city considered a monorail system, which would have been the first in the US.

In 2018 a design for a gyroscopic rail car won first place at the German Mobility Award. In 2020 developers secured government funding of EUR 3.6 million to develop a prototype and it was expected testing could commence in 2022. The vehicles will be designed to run on existing but abandoned railway lines, passing each other on the existing rails.

== Evolution of 'wheel on steel' monorail ==
The vehicles referenced above (with the exception of the still in full service Wuppertal monorail) are now little more than historical curiosities. The advantage of the monorail of crossing rough mountainous terrain was relevant to the time of expansion of railway networks over virgin country, and in most cases the conventional railway proved the more appropriate solution, except for a few niches. Monorail tracks were rarely longer than 60 mi (97 km), and usually considerably shorter. The motor road vehicle finally displaced the monorail from its few niche applications.

Wheel on steel characterised monorails of this early era, just as it does conventional railways, although some bicycle railways could react against the stabilizing rail to increase adhesion, improving acceleration, braking and hill climbing.

== The modern era: straddling beams ==
The development of automotive technology has given rise to a new class of monorail which owes little to the work of Palmer and Lartigue. These vehicles are suspended from or straddle concrete beams, and use pneumatic tyres to improve adhesion and reduce noise compared with wheel on steel. They have more in common with guided buses than conventional railways. The beam is less obtrusive than an overhead roadway or railway, and the modern designs may have a niche in dealing with right of way problems in congested city centres, at lower cost compared with tunneling.

== See also ==
- Gyrocar
- Monorail
- Meigs Elevated Railway
- Haddan 1872
