= Avenue J station =

New York City Subway station in Brooklyn

Avenue J
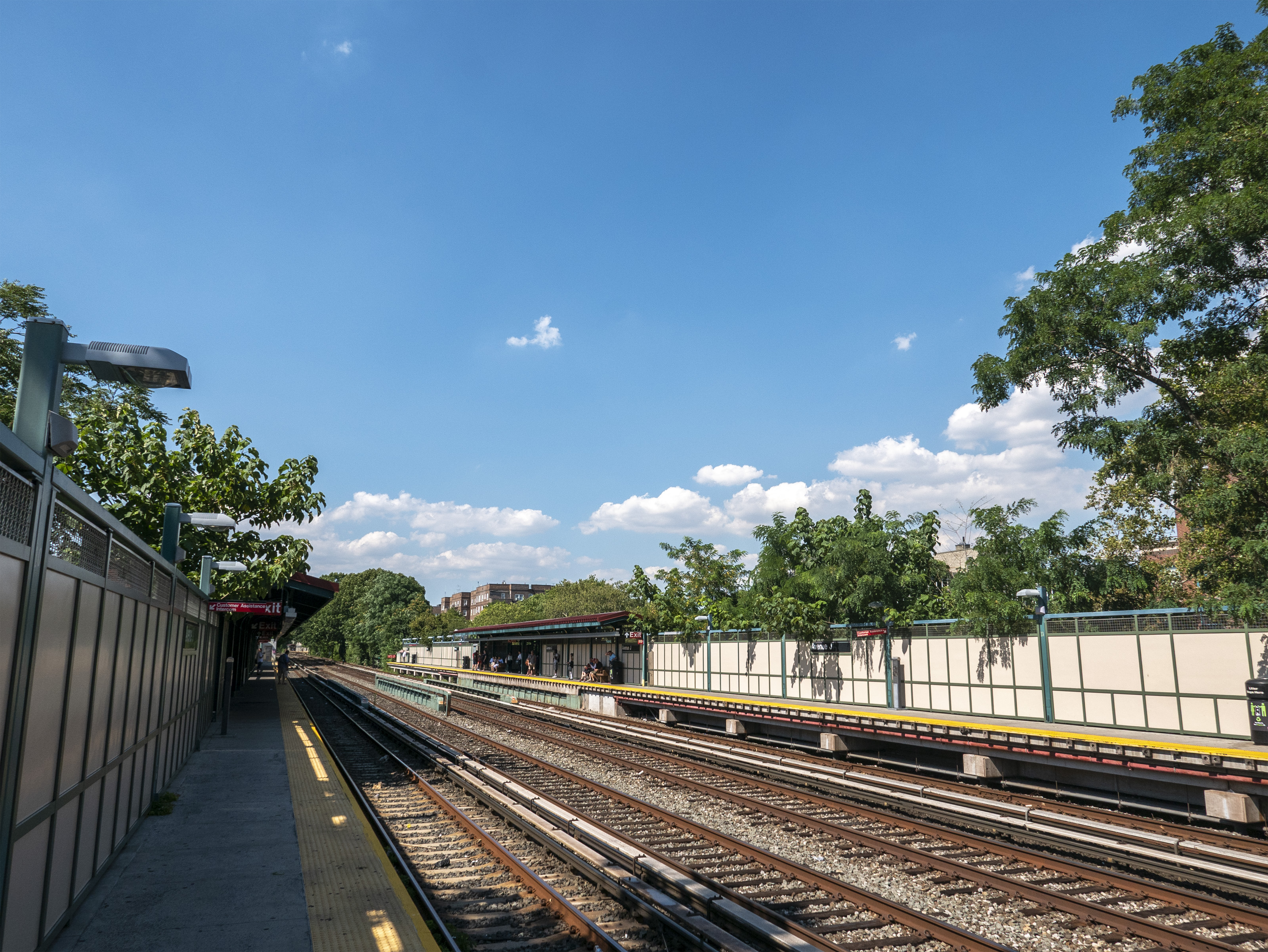
- View from the southbound platform

Station statistics
- Address: Avenue J & East 16th Street; Brooklyn, New York
- Borough: Brooklyn
- Locale: Midwood
- Coordinates: 40.625276°N 73.961372°W
- Division: B (BMT)
- Line: BMT Brighton Line
- Services: Q (all times)
- Transit: NYCT Bus: B6, B11
- Structure: Embankment
- Platforms: 2 side platforms
- Tracks: 4

Other information
- Opened: c. 1900
- Former/other names: Manhattan Terrace

Traffic
- 2025: 1,243,856 ▲7.8%
- Rank: 268 out of 423
Services
Preceding station	New York City Subway	Following station
Avenue H toward 96th Street	Local	Avenue M toward Coney Island–Stillwell Avenue
does not stop here
Location
Location within New York City Subway
Location within New York City
Location within New York
Track layout
Street map
Station service legend
Symbol	Description
Stops all times	Stops all times

The Avenue J station is a local station on the BMT Brighton Line of the New York City Subway, located on Avenue J between East 15th and East 16th Streets in Midwood, Brooklyn. The station is served by the Q train at all times.

== History ==
The station was opened around 1900 as a two-track surface station and named Manhattan Terrace. It was renamed "Avenue J" in 1907, the same year the railroad line was grade separated. Vestiges of the spur built to reconnect the Brighton Line and Long Island Rail Road's Bay Ridge Branch after grade separation still exist to this day.

On August 1, 1920, a tunnel under Flatbush Avenue opened, connecting the Brighton Line to the Broadway subway in Manhattan. At the same time, the line's former track connections to the Fulton Street Elevated were severed. Subway trains from Manhattan and elevated trains from Franklin Avenue served Brighton Line stations, sharing the line to Coney Island.

This station underwent reconstruction from September 2009 to December 2011. Both platforms were rebuilt with new windscreens, canopies, and tactile strip edges. A temporary platform over the express tracks was used to provide service on the side that was under rebuilding. The new windscreens were controversial with nearby community members, since the windscreens contained gaps that allowed trash and noise through while causing privacy issues for residents whose backyards faced the station.

== Station layout ==
The station is on a raised earthen embankment. There are four tracks and two side platforms. The two center tracks are used by the B express train on weekdays.

The 2011 artwork here is called Bird Laid Bare by Rita MacDonald. It consists of murals and mosaics on the walls of the Coney Island-bound platform's main staircase depicting various species of birds.

=== Exits ===
The station's main house is located underneath the right-of-way on the south side of Avenue J and has a full-time turnstile bank and token booth. There is a double-wide staircase facing north going up to the Coney Island-bound platform and one narrow staircase facing south going up to the Manhattan-bound platform. The Coney Island-bound staircase's landing has two exit-only turnstiles leading directly to the street.

Both platforms have an unstaffed bank of turnstiles leading to a staircase that goes down to the north side of Avenue J. The Coney Island-bound one is double-wide.

== Gallery ==
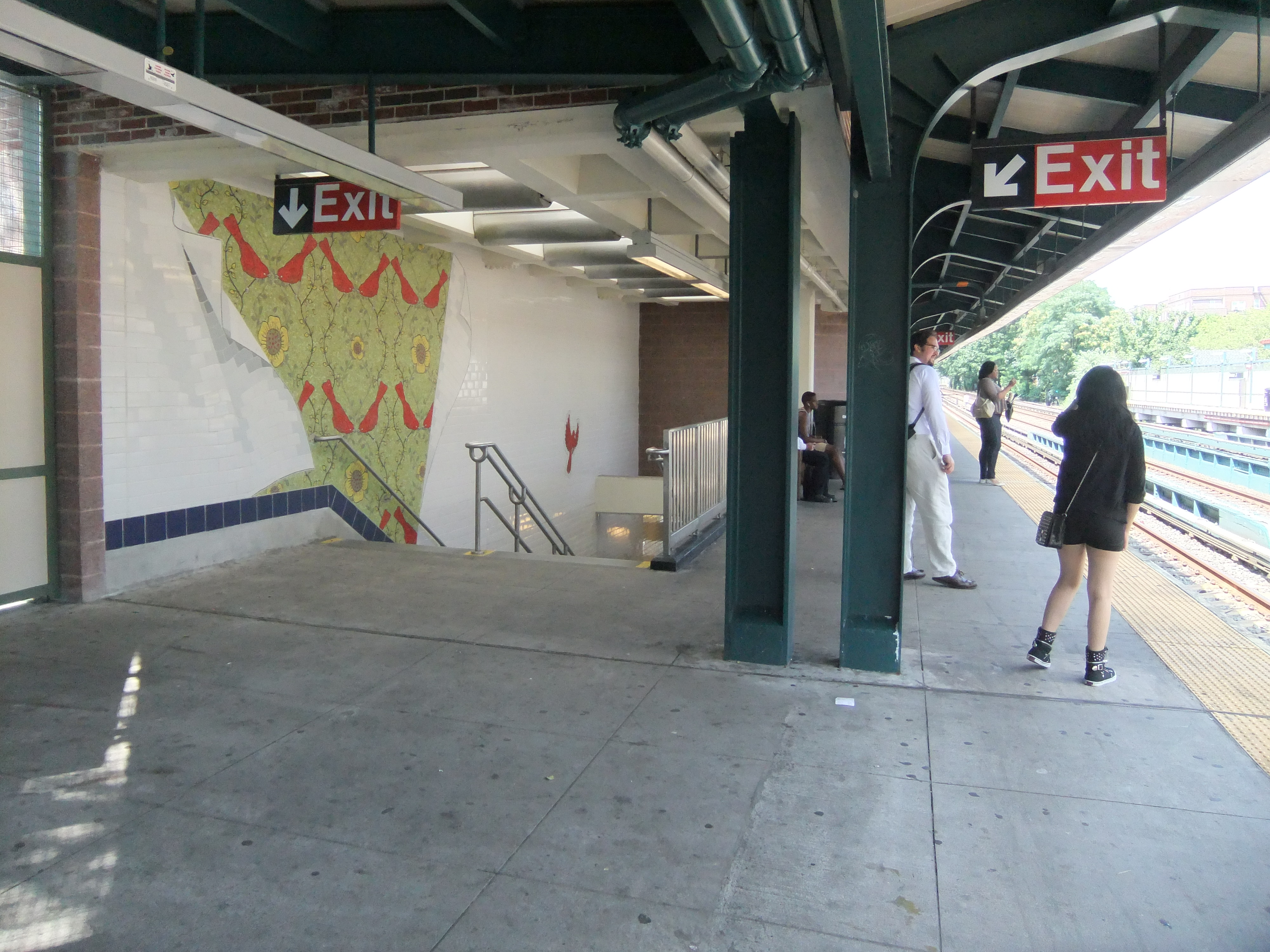
Exit on platform

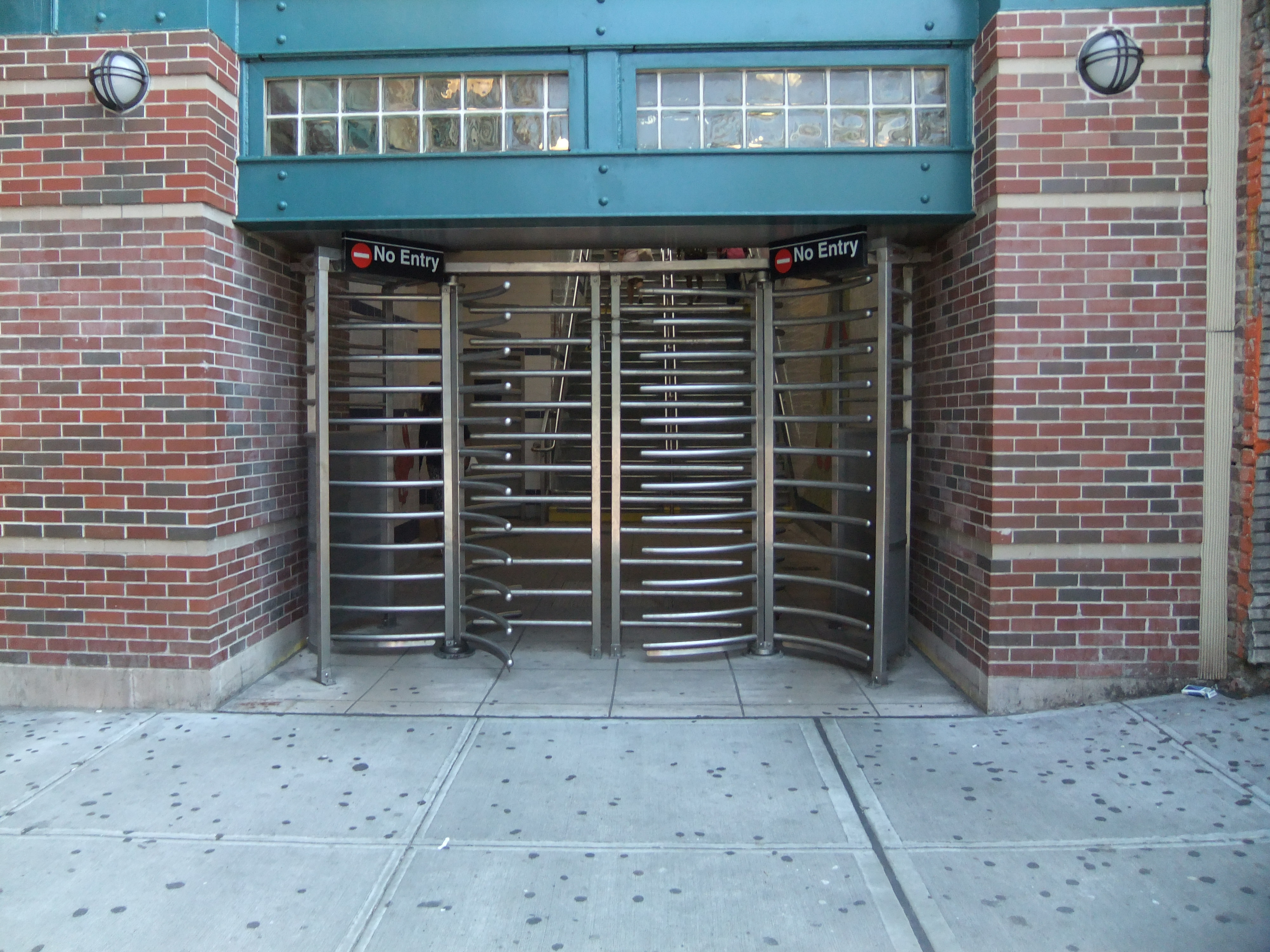
Exit-only turnstile and gate at Avenue J

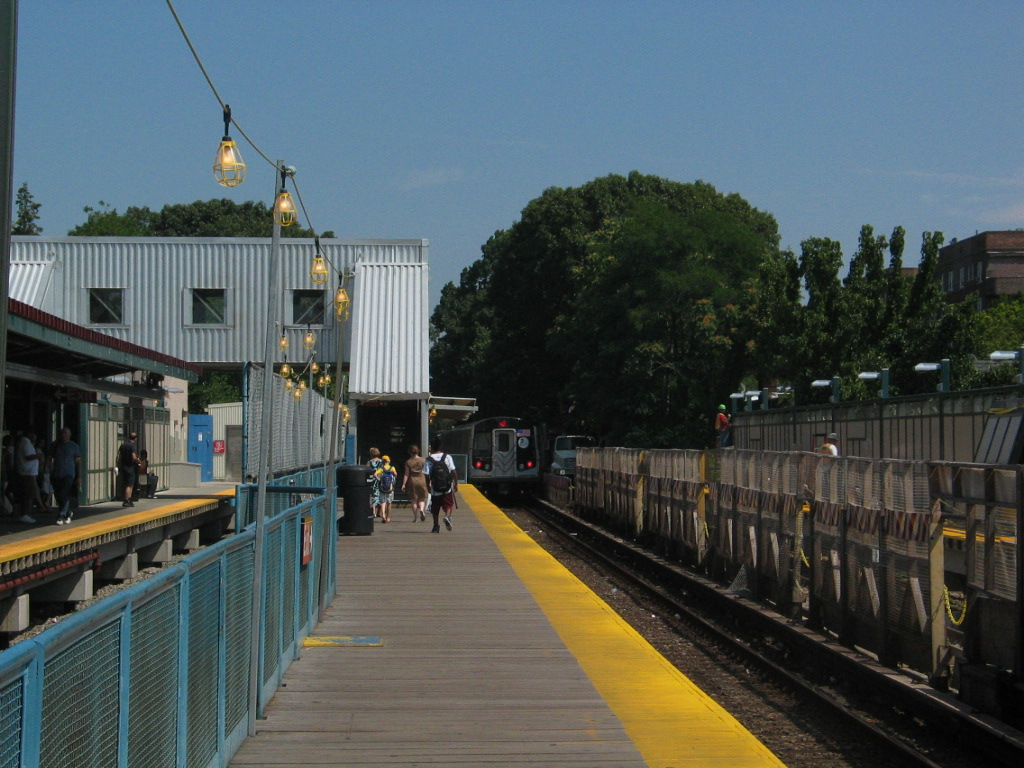
Temporary platform during the reconstruction in 2011

== See also ==
- Manhattan Beach Branch
- Bay Ridge Branch
