= Avenue U =

Avenue in Brooklyn, New York

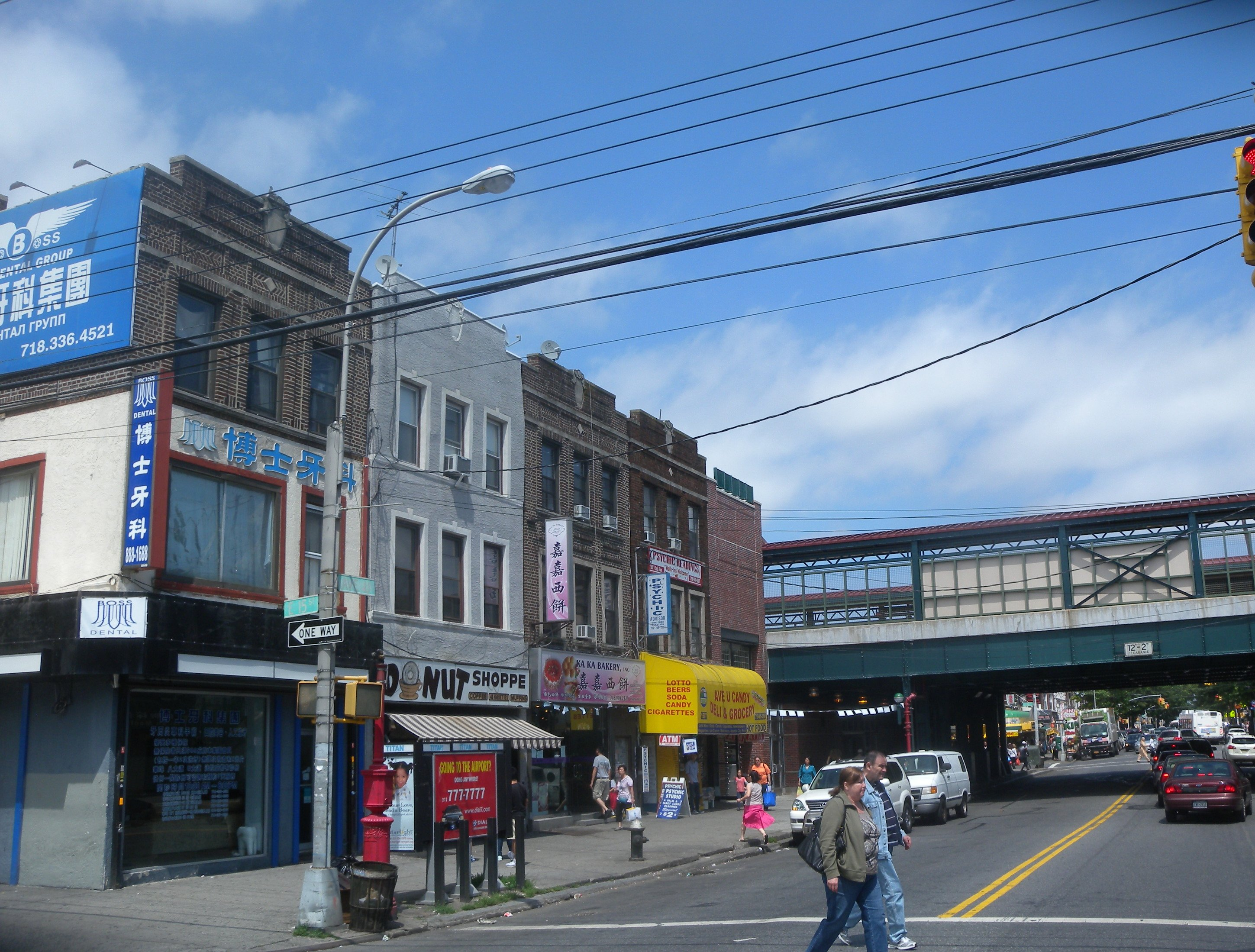
- Avenue U at East 15th Street, in the developing Avenue U Chinatown. The Brighton Line station is in the background.
- Owner: City of New York
- Maintained by: NYCDOT
- Location: Brooklyn, New York City
- West end: Stillwell Avenue in Gravesend
- East end: Bergen Avenue at Bergen Beach
- North: Avenue T
- South: Avenue V

Avenue U is a commercial street located in Brooklyn, New York City. This avenue is a main thoroughfare throughout its length. Avenue U begins at Stillwell Avenue in Gravesend and ends at Bergen Avenue in Bergen Beach, while serving the other Brooklyn neighborhoods of Gravesend, Homecrest, Sheepshead Bay, Marine Park, and Mill Basin along its route.

== Little Hong Kong/Guangdong ==
Avenue U in Homecrest now supports southern Brooklyn's second Chinatown, as evidenced by the growing number of Chinese food markets, bakeries, restaurants, beauty and nail salons, and computer and consumer electronics dealers between Coney Island Avenue and Ocean Avenue. Since 2004, the Q train on the BMT Brighton Line goes to Canal Street in the Manhattan Chinatown to Brooklyn's Avenue U Chinatown directly. A third Chinatown has subsequently emerged in southern Brooklyn, in Bensonhurst, served by the D, R, and W trains.

This Chinatown on Avenue U is actually a second extension of Manhattan's Chinatown, after the original Brooklyn Chinatown, which had developed in Sunset Park. Within a sixteen-year period, the Chinese population grew an estimated fourteenfold. The increasing property values and congestion in Brooklyn's first established Chinatown on 8th Avenue in Sunset Park led to the still increasing Chinese population in Brooklyn pouring into the Sheepshead Bay and Homecrest sections, which in the late 1990s resulted in the establishment of a second Chinatown on Avenue U between the Homecrest and Sheepshead Bay sections.

The Avenue U Chinatown is now in expansion mode, despite originating initially from less than ten blocks, originally resembling Manhattan's Chinatown in the late 19th and early 20th centuries, when that Chinatown was still in the early stages of its development, and concentrated within a ten-block section of Mott, Doyers, and Pell Streets.

The Chinese residents call Avenue U in Chinese translation U大道 and call Sheepshead Bay (羊头湾). Just outside this Chinese enclave, also on Avenue U, there are many Chinese supermarkets with the largest being Star Market on 1805 Avenue U. The East West Bank currently serves as the largest Chinese financial institution for the Avenue U Chinatown.

This newly emerging Chinese enclave and as well as in sections of Bensonhurst are primarily Cantonese populated and more of extensions of the Western Cantonese section of Manhattan's Chinatown or Little Hong Kong/Little Guangdong or Cantonese Town and although they all together have far surpassed Manhattan's Chinatown as being the largest Cantonese cultural centers of NYC, however this Avenue U Cantonese enclave alone is still the smallest Cantonese enclave of NYC while Bensonhurst alone is now home to the largest Cantonese cultural center of NYC. However, there are small numbers of Fuzhou and Mandarin speakers. There is also a small significant amount of Vietnamese Chinese residents integrated into the community as well.

== Population and settlements ==
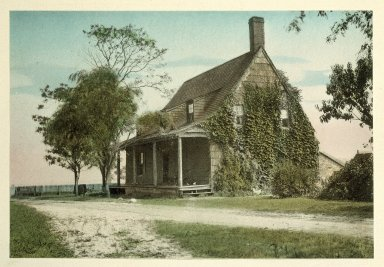
The Schenck-Crooke House, built 1675, as it stood on what is now the corner of Avenue U and East 63rd Street

Chinese immigrants have become the second largest foreign-born group in New York City behind the Dominican Republic. As of 2016, approximately 12 percent of New York City's population, or 380,000 people, were born in the Dominican Republic. In second place, approximately 11 percent of New York City's population, or 350,000 people, were born in China. China, however, had the largest source of immigrants within Brooklyn. Chinese immigrants made up approximately 14 percent of Brooklyn's population, totaling to about 129,000 people. Bensonhurst specifically contained about 78,000 of those immigrants, making Bensonhurst's total population 53 percent foreign-born. The Avenue U Chinatown has the most pronounced and quickest growing Chinese population in all of New York City. In the period of time from 1990-2000, the overall number of people living on Avenue U increased by 16-30 percent. Brooklyn's population, as of 2010, is 2.553 million and this number is expected to increase by over 11 percent by 2040.

Though Brooklyn's Avenue U has the largest Chinese population in all of New York City, the street itself is a filled evidence of other cultures. The Cantonese influence is visibly laced throughout the shops and restaurants on Avenue U. In addition, there are Italian, Mexican, Russian, Vietnamese, Uzbek, and more markets and restaurants scattered along the street. Culturally, Avenue U has hosted more than Chinese immigrants, moving from Jewish to Irish and Italian to Russian to Chinese and Mexican immigrants alike. With each wave of new immigrants, the old culture will find a new place within New York to settle.

Middle-class immigrants populate Gravesend, one section in which Avenue U is located. As of 2008, these immigrants pay upward of $600,000 to live close to their relatives. Jewish, Irish, and Italian families most of all populate the Sephardic community. At the same time, Chinese, Mexican, Russian, and Yugoslavian immigrants also live in Gravesend.

== Transportation ==
There are three New York City Subway stations in Brooklyn named Avenue U:

- Avenue U station (BMT Brighton Line), served by the Q train
- Avenue U station (IND Culver Line), served by the F and <F> trains
- Avenue U station (BMT Sea Beach Line), served by the N and W trains

Bus service on Avenue U is provided by the following:

- The B3 bus operates on Avenue U for its entire length, except from 86th Street to Stillwell Avenue and from East 71st Street to Bergen Avenue. East 71st Street is the route’s eastern terminal.
- The B47 runs on the avenue between Mill Avenue and East 54th Street, located near Kings Plaza, where it terminates.
- The B100 runs between Mill Avenue and East 66th Street.
- The BM1 express bus runs between East 71st Street and East 66th Street.

== See also ==
- Chinatowns in NYC:
  - Brooklyn's Fuzhou Town
  - Chinatown, Manhattan
  - Chinatown, Flushing
  - Chinatown, Elmhurst
  - Little Hong Kong/Guangdong
  - Little Fuzhou
    - Corona, Queens
  - Bensonhurst, Brooklyn
- List of Brooklyn streets
- List of lettered Brooklyn avenues
