= Brighton Line =

Brighton Line can refer to:

- BMT Brighton Line, a rapid transit line of the New York City Subway
- Brighton Main Line, a railway line between London and Brighton, England
