= Avenue U station (BMT Brighton Line) =

New York City Subway station in Brooklyn

Avenue U
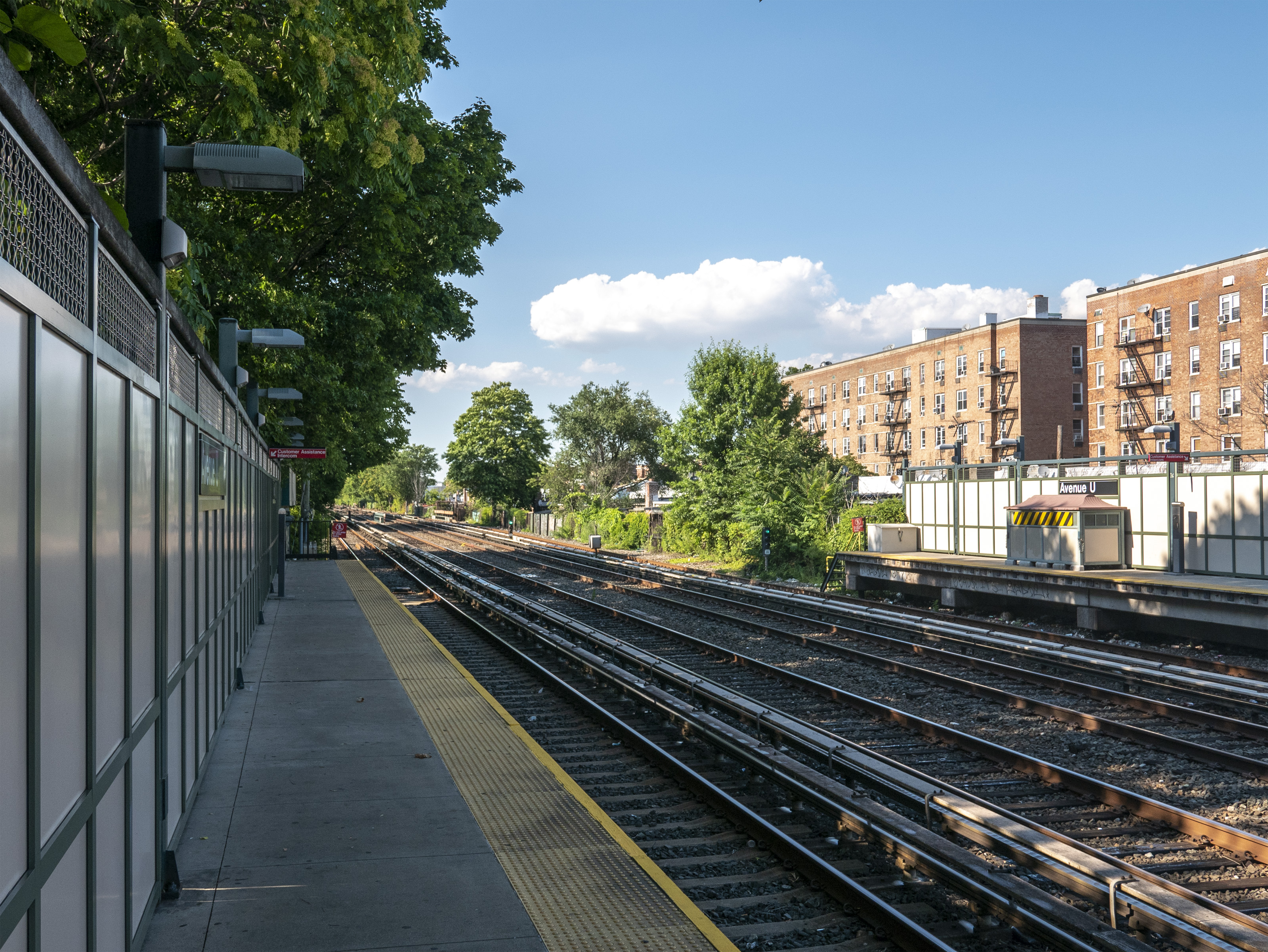
- View from southbound platform

Station statistics
- Address: Avenue U & East 16th Street; Brooklyn, New York
- Borough: Brooklyn
- Locale: Homecrest, Sheepshead Bay
- Coordinates: 40.598875°N 73.955841°W
- Division: B (BMT)
- Line: BMT Brighton Line
- Services: Q (all times)
- Transit: NYCT Bus: B3
- Structure: Embankment
- Platforms: 2 side platforms
- Tracks: 4

Other information
- Opened: (surface station): c. 1902 (current station): c. 1908

Traffic
- 2025: 1,570,158 ▲2.3%
- Rank: 224 out of 423
Services
Preceding station	New York City Subway	Following station
Kings Highway toward 96th Street	Local	Neck Road toward Coney Island–Stillwell Avenue
does not stop here
Location
Location within New York City Subway
Location within New York City
Location within New York
Track layout
Street map
Station service legend
Symbol	Description
Stops all times	Stops all times

The Avenue U station is a local station on the BMT Brighton Line of the New York City Subway, located at Avenue U between East 15th and East 16th Streets in Homecrest and Sheepshead Bay, Brooklyn. The station is served by the Q train at all times.

== History ==
The original station was opened on the surface Brighton Beach Railroad at Avenue U near East 15th Street, c.1902, coincident with the building of the community of Homecrest, It was closed during elevation of the Brighton Line and the current station opened around 1908.

On August 1, 1920, a tunnel under Flatbush Avenue opened, connecting the Brighton Line to the Broadway subway in Manhattan. At the same time, the line's former track connections to the Fulton Street Elevated were severed. Subway trains from Manhattan and elevated trains from Franklin Avenue served Brighton Line stations, sharing the line to Coney Island.

It underwent more recent reconstruction from December 2008 to January 2010. Both platforms were rebuilt with new windscreens, canopies, and tactile strip edges.

== Station layout ==
The station is located on a raised earthen embankment. There are four tracks and two side platforms. The two center tracks are used by the B express train on weekdays.

Both platforms have beige windscreens with green outlines and frames along their entire lengths and red canopies with green frames in the center. The station signs are in the standard black plates in white lettering and lamp posts are on all support columns of the windscreens in the non-canopied areas. The Coney Island-bound platform has a storage area above the mezzanine staircase.

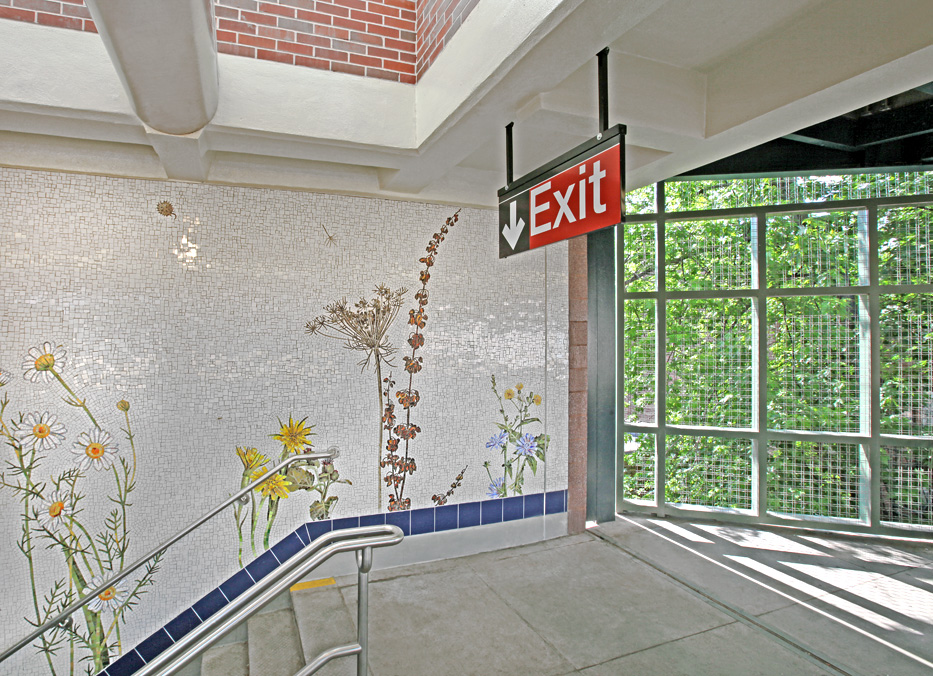
Artwork by Jason Middlebrook

The 2011 artwork here is called Brooklyn Wildfires by Jason Middlebrook and Miotto Mosaic Art Studio. It is installed on the walls of the Coney Island-bound platform's staircase and consists of ceramic tiling and glass mosaic depicting various species of wildflowers.

=== Exit ===
The station has one ground-level station house directly underneath the tracks and platforms on the north side of Avenue U. It has a token booth, turnstile bank, and double-wide staircase going up to the Coney Island-bound platform and two standard width staircases to the Manhattan-bound one. The Coney Island-bound staircase landing splits below a landing, one side leading to the station house and the other bypassing it with two exit-only turnstiles leading directly to the sidewalk. The Coney Island-bound platform also has a metal door leading to a closed staircase that goes down to the north side of Avenue U.
