= Manhattan Beach Branch =

Former Long Island Rail Road branch

- Map of the New York and Manhattan Beach Railway, with southernmost line being the Manhattan Beach Branch

Overview
- Status: Abandoned
- Owner: Long Island Rail Road
- Locale: Brooklyn, New York, USA
- Termini: Myrtle Avenue; Manhattan Beach
- Stations: 8

Service
- System: Long Island Rail Road
- Operator(s): Long Island Rail Road

History
- Opened: 1877
- Closed: 1930s

Technical
- Number of tracks: 2
- Track gauge: 4 ft 8 1/2 in (1,435 mm)

The Manhattan Beach Branch, Manhattan Beach Line, or Manhattan Beach Division was a line of the Long Island Rail Road, running from Fresh Pond, Queens, south to Manhattan Beach, Brooklyn, New York City, United States. It opened in 1877 and 1878 as the main line of the New York and Manhattan Beach Railway. The tracks from Flatbush south to Manhattan Beach were removed from 1938 to 1941, while most of the rest is now the freight-only Bay Ridge Branch.

At Manhattan Beach, the line extended east to Oriental Beach, and a branch to the Sheepshead Bay Race Track was provided north of Sheepshead Bay. Other lines in the Manhattan Beach Division included the West Brighton Beach Division (Culver Line), Bay Ridge Branch, and Evergreen Branch.

== History ==
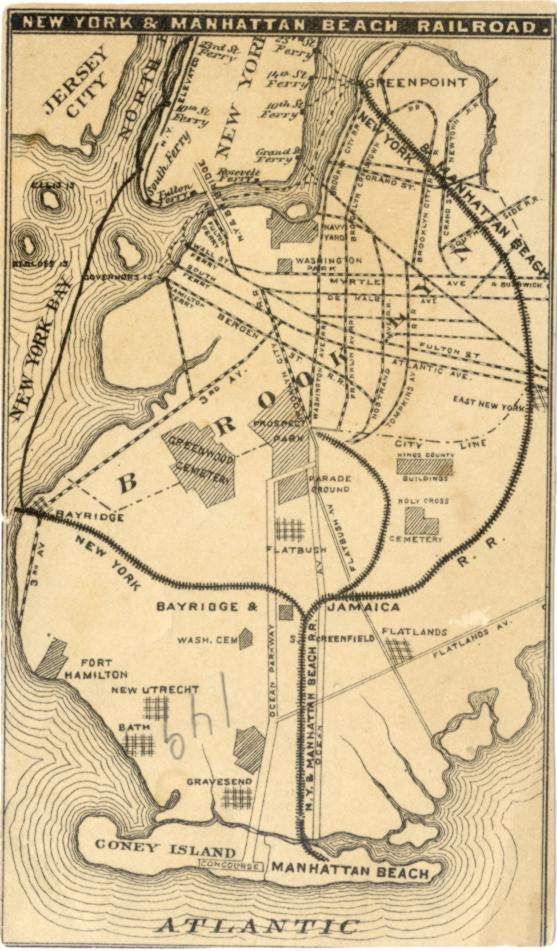
1878 map, including the short-lived Prospect Park Division

Planning for a line to Bay Ridge began in 1870 by the New York and Hempstead Plains Railroad (which built the Southern Hempstead Branch from Valley Stream to Hempstead). By 1873, the line was to run from Bay Ridge to East New York, where it would join the LIRR's Atlantic Avenue Division to Jamaica. The panic of 1873 struck after much work had been done in grading the new line.

=== Incorporation ===
The New York, Bay Ridge and Jamaica Railroad was incorporated on November 20, 1875, to complete the work and operate the line to Jamaica, using the Brooklyn and Rockaway Beach Railroad (Canarsie Line) from New Lots to East New York and the LIRR Atlantic Avenue Division to Jamaica. The first piece, from the Bay Ridge Ferry (to South Ferry, Manhattan) to the crossing of the Brooklyn, Bath and Coney Island Railroad (West End Line) at New Utrecht, opened on August 23, 1876. Trains were operated over the BB&CI to Coney Island via trackage rights from this junction. Banker Austin Corbin incorporated the New York and Manhattan Beach Railway on October 24, 1876, to build a branch of this line to Manhattan Beach and extend it beyond East New York to Greenpoint and Hunter's Point. Corbin gained control of the New York, Bay Ridge and Jamaica Railroad on November 15, 1876. The NY&MB bought the eastern half of Coney Island from the town of Gravesend and renamed it Manhattan Beach.

The NYBR&J built the line from Bay Ridge east to New Lots, while the NY&MB built from Manhattan Beach north to the NYBR&J at Manhattan Beach Junction and from New Lots north to East New York on the west side of the Canarsie Line. The new 3 ft (914 mm) narrow gauge system opened to terminals at Bay Ridge and East New York on July 18, 1877, concurrently with the Manhattan Beach Hotel and the New York and Sea Beach Railroad. (The NY&MB leased the NYBR&J.)

The Glendale and East River Railroad was incorporated on March 26, 1874, to build a 3 ft (914 mm) narrow gauge line from Greenpoint east to Glendale, Queens, and was also acquired by Corbin in November 1876. The line north from East New York to Jefferson Street was built by the NY&MB under the charter of the Brooklyn and Rockaway Beach Railroad (Canarsie Line), which gave its right to construct an extension to Hunter's Point to the NY&MB. The rest from Jefferson Street to Greenpoint was built by the G&ER and leased by the NY&MB. This extension beyond East New York to Greenpoint opened at the beginning of the season on May 16, 1878.

The Kings County Central Railroad was incorporated in 1877 by Electus B. Litchfield and Austin Corbin to build a 3 ft (914 mm) narrow gauge line from downtown Brooklyn via the east side of Prospect Park to a connection with the NYBR&J east of Manhattan Beach, and to be leased by the NYBR&J. The line, operated by the NY&MB as its Prospect Park Division (along with the Bay Ridge and Greenpoint Divisions), was opened June 29, 1878, to Prospect Park, but was a failure and closed for good at the end of the 1878 season.

The Eastern Railroad of Long Island was organized on November 28, 1878, to build a 3 ft (914 mm) line from East New York on the NY&MB east via Woodhaven, Clarenceville, Jamaica, Springfield, Woodsburgh, Valley Stream, East Rockaway, Christian Hook, Freeport, Merrick, and South Oyster Bay to Babylon in competition with the LIRR's Southern Railroad Division. Corbin, who owned a summer house near Babylon, put up the money to build the road, which was also planned to cross the South Bay near Amityville to Fire Island.

=== Post-incorporation ===
Corbin acquired a controlling interest in the Long Island Rail Road on November 29, 1880 and became president on January 1, 1881. In December 1881, the LIRR leased the NY&MB and NYBR&J as the Manhattan Beach Division, with plans to change it to 4 ft 8 1/2 in (1,435 mm) standard gauge and build connections to the Atlantic Avenue Division and Montauk Division. The lines from East New York to Manhattan Beach and Bay Ridge were converted to 4 ft 8 1/2 in (1,435 mm) standard gauge after the 1882 season, and the Long Island City and Manhattan Beach Railroad (incorporated February 24, 1883) built a connection from the new Cooper Avenue Junction north to another new junction, Fresh Pond Junction, on the Montauk. Trains began running from Flatbush Avenue to Manhattan Beach via the Atlantic Avenue Division on May 30, 1883, and from Long Island City via the Montauk Division on June 2, 1883.

For the 1884 season (opened May 29), the double-track narrow gauge line between East New York and Greenpoint was replaced with a single standard gauge track. 1885 was the last year that trains ran to Greenpoint, and the line between Greenpoint and the Bushwick Branch crossing was abandoned in October; they started using Bushwick instead in the 1886 season. Passenger trains stopped serving the line, later the Evergreen Branch, to Bushwick in 1894.

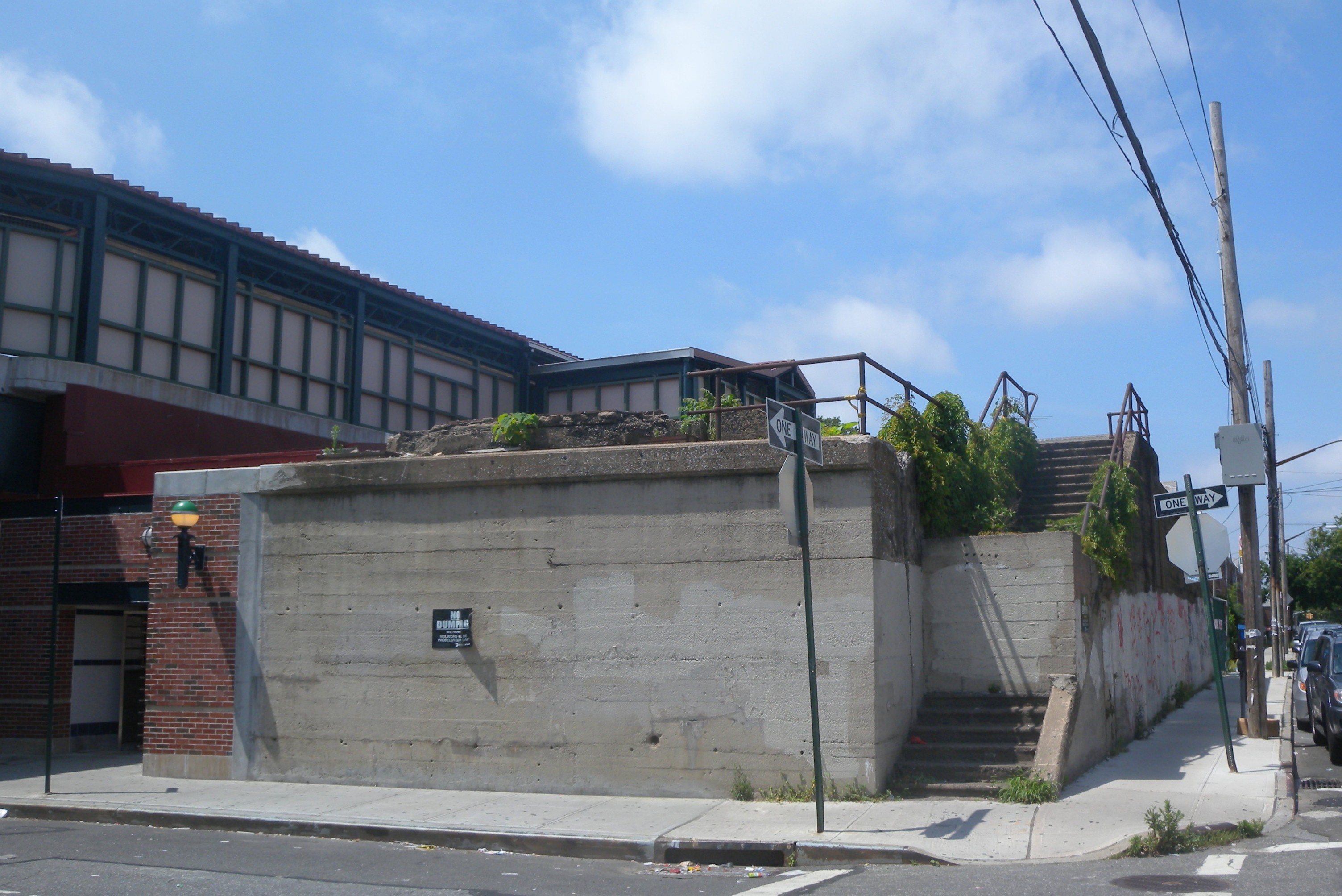
Former Neck Road LIRR station along the east side of the BMT Brighton Line in Homecrest, Brooklyn.

The New York, Bay Ridge and Jamaica Railroad, New York and Manhattan Beach Railroad, and Long Island City and Manhattan Beach Railroad merged on August 27, 1885 to form the New York, Brooklyn and Manhattan Beach Railway. This company was merged into the LIRR on June 19, 1925, and the Glendale and East River Railroad was absorbed in 1928.

=== Closure and post-closure ===
The line south of Manhattan Beach Junction was upgraded to a grade-separated embankment shared with the Brighton Beach Line during 1907–1909. A New York State prohibition on racetrack wagering and the decline of the more upscale resorts on Coney Island, combined with more direct and lower-priced competition from nearby rapid transit and streetcar lines, led to a rapid decline in the Manhattan Beach's economic viability. Passenger service ended completely in 1924, and freight ended in 1935. On May 17, 1937, the LIRR applied to the Interstate Commerce Commission for permission to abandon the line.

In 2011, the long abandoned right-of-way of the New York, Brooklyn and Manhattan Beach Railway was subject to legal action by some homeowners living adjacent to its route in Sheepshead Bay, who wanted to acquire undisputed title to it.

== List of stations ==
Miles from LIC	Name	Opened	Closed	Notes
	Manhattan Beach Junction	1884	1915	
12.87	South Greenfield	July 18, 1877	May 14, 1924	Connection to Brooklyn, Flatbush and Coney Island Railway
13.51	King's Highway	1883	May 14, 1924	
14.46	Neck Road	1893	May 14, 1924	
14.77	Race Track			Named for Sheepshead Bay Race Track
15.10	Sheepshead Bay	July 18, 1877	May 14, 1924	Connection to Brooklyn, Flatbush and Coney Island Railway
16.10	Manhattan Beach	July 18, 1877	May 14, 1924	
