= Kings Highway station (BMT Brighton Line) =

New York City Subway station in Brooklyn

Kings Highway
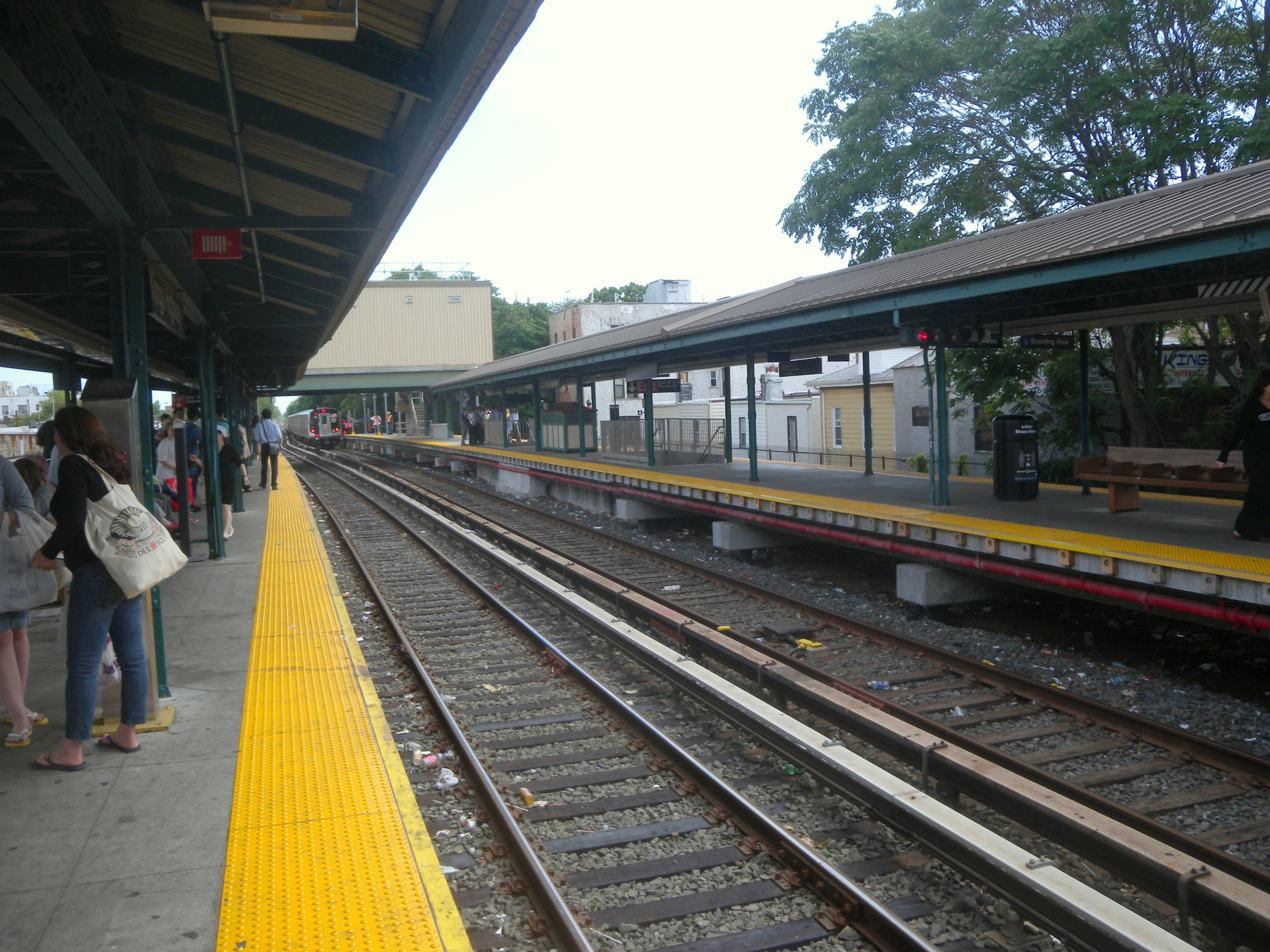
- Platforms view

Station statistics
- Address: Kings Highway & East 16th Street; Brooklyn, New York
- Borough: Brooklyn
- Locale: Midwood, Homecrest
- Coordinates: 40.609229°N 73.95884°W
- Division: B (BMT)
- Line: BMT Brighton Line
- Services: B (weekday rush hours, middays and early evenings); Q (all times)
- Transit: NYCT Bus: B2, B7, B31, B82, B82 SBS; MTA Bus: B100
- Structure: Embankment
- Platforms: 2 island platforms cross-platform interchange
- Tracks: 4

Other information
- Opened: original station: July 2, 1878; 148 years ago
- Rebuilt: current station: August 23, 1907; 119 years ago
- Accessible: Yes

Traffic
- 2025: 4,432,752 ▲5%
- Rank: 72 out of 423
Services
Preceding station	New York City Subway	Following station
Newkirk Plaza B toward 145th Street	Express	Sheepshead Bay B toward Brighton Beach
Avenue M Q toward 96th Street	Local	Avenue U Q toward Coney Island–Stillwell Avenue
Former services
Preceding station	Long Island Rail Road	Following station
South Greenfield toward Manhattan Beach Junction	Manhattan Beach Branch	Neck Road toward Manhattan Beach
Location
Location within New York City Subway
Location within New York City
Location within New York
Track layout
Street map
Station service legend
Symbol	Description
Stops all times	Stops all times
Stops weekdays during the day	Stops weekdays during the day

The Kings Highway station is an express station on the BMT Brighton Line of the New York City Subway. It is located at Kings Highway between East 15th and East 16th Streets on the border of Midwood and Homecrest neighborhoods of Brooklyn. The station is served by the Q train at all times and by the B train on weekdays only.

== History ==
On August 1, 1920, a tunnel under Flatbush Avenue opened, connecting the Brighton Line to the Broadway subway in Manhattan. At the same time, the line's former track connections to the Fulton Street Elevated were severed. Subway trains from Manhattan and elevated trains from Franklin Avenue served Brighton Line stations, sharing the line to Coney Island.

On January 10, 1951, a new entrance to Quentin Road and East 16th Street was opened with a modern station house. The $250,000 project took approximately a year to be completed.

A renovation of the Kings Highway station was funded as part of the MTA's 1980–1984 capital plan. The MTA received a $106 million grant from the Urban Mass Transit Administration in October 1983; most of the grant would fund the renovation of eleven stations, including Kings Highway.

This station underwent reconstruction from 2009 to 2011, which included installation of ADA-accessible elevators to the full-time fare control area and rebuilding of the platforms and station houses. A temporary platform was used to provide service that would normally stop at the closed platform.

== Station layout ==
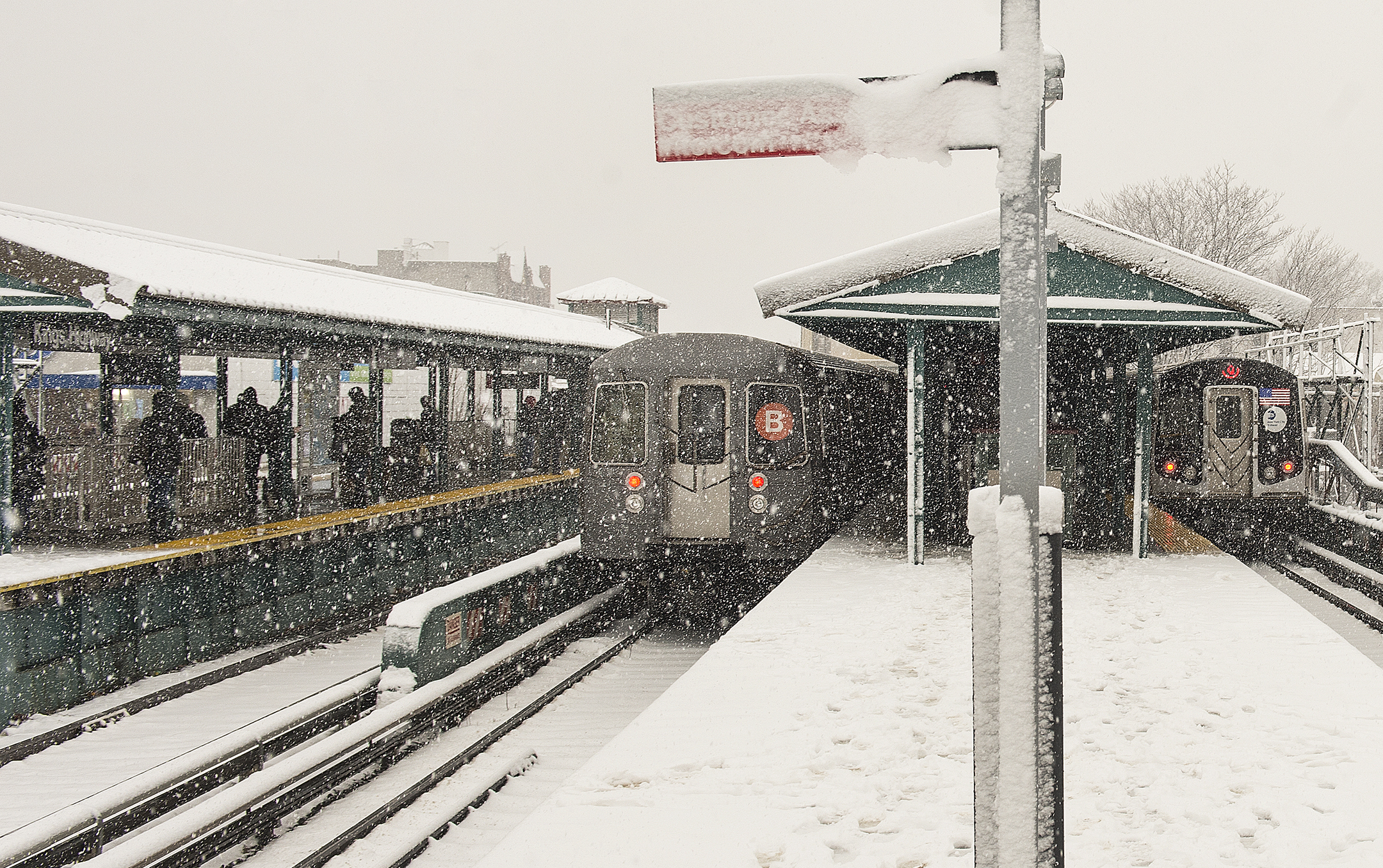
The southbound platform in February 2014, after the reconstruction project

This station has four tracks and two island platforms. The Q stops here at all times and is local, while the B stops here only on weekdays during the day and is express. The next stop to the north is Avenue M for local trains and Newkirk Plaza for express trains, while the next stop to the south is Avenue U for local trains and Sheepshead Bay for express trains.

The two platforms are offset from each other, with the northbound platform located roughly 75 feet (23 m) further north than the southbound platform. It has three fare control areas at street level—two to Kings Highway/East 16th Street and one to Quentin Road/East 16th Street. The two mezzanines at Kings Highway, located directly underneath the subway embankment, were constructed in the original BMT format, but fully renovated in the 1980s, during which two identical sets of porcelain enamel artwork (Kings Highway Hieroglyphs by Rhoda Andors) were installed, one set in each mezzanine.

South of Kings Highway are a series of switches that allow trains to switch from the local tracks to the express ones, and vice versa. Before the Brighton signal replacement during the 1990s, a switch tower was in operation about 150 feet (46 m) south of the station, facing the southbound local track; this tower has been abandoned, and control of the switches has passed to a master tower at DeKalb Avenue. During the signal replacement, a new signal electrical tower was installed over the express tracks at the south end of the station.

=== Exits ===
The entrance on the south side is normally the full-time entrance/exit, containing a turnstile bank, token booth, two staircases to each platform, and one exit-only turnstile from the Coney Island-bound platform. The one on the north is HEET access only, containing three turnstiles, a staircase to each platform and its MetroCard Vending Machines were installed on the sidewalk.

The part-time Quentin Road station house, located to the east of the embankment, has a turnstile bank, part-time booth, and two staircases to each platform. It was built after the station's opening to accommodate growing passenger flow as evidenced by its newer-style tiling and signage. Platform extensions are clearly present at the north end of the station. It has a token booth, turnstile bank, and two staircases to each platform with the southbound side requiring a short walk.

== Gallery ==
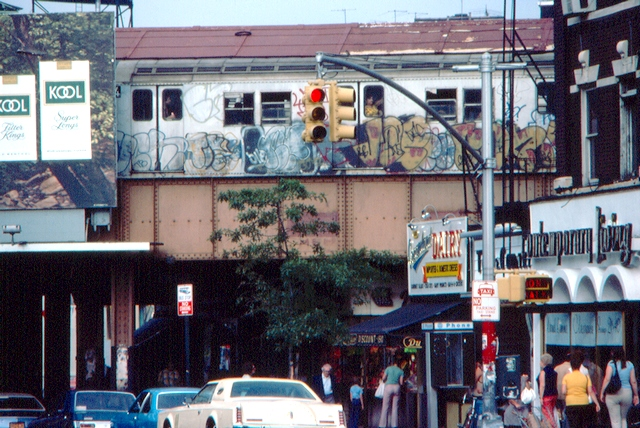
Kings Highway station, early 1980s

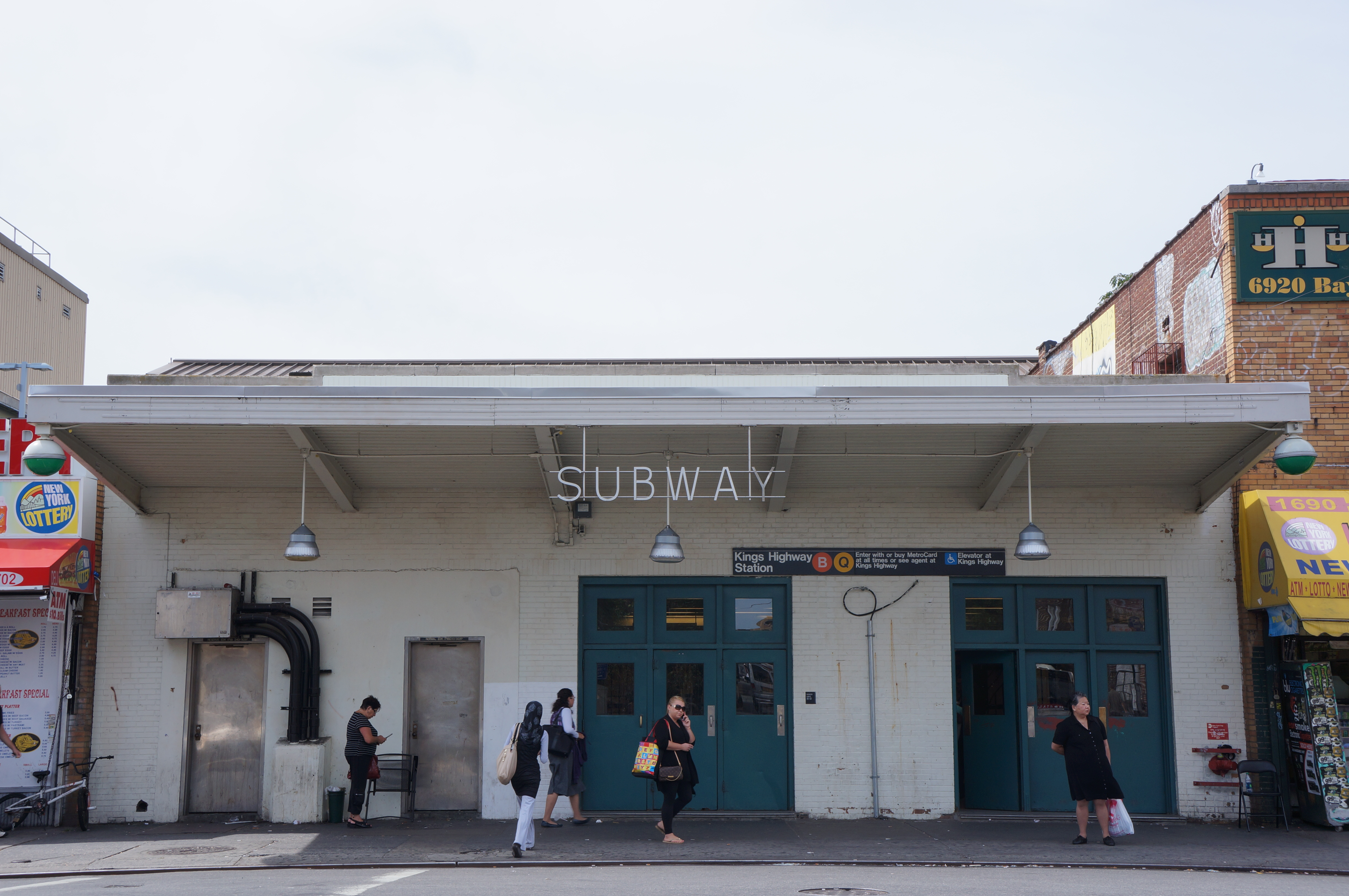
Quentin Road station house

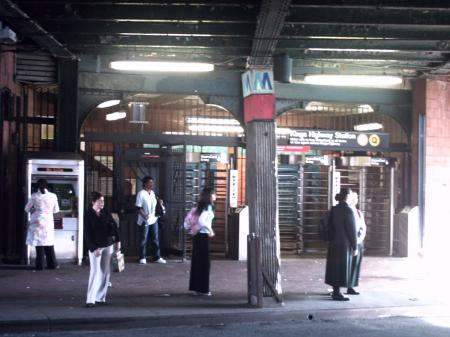
Entrance at the north side of Kings Highway

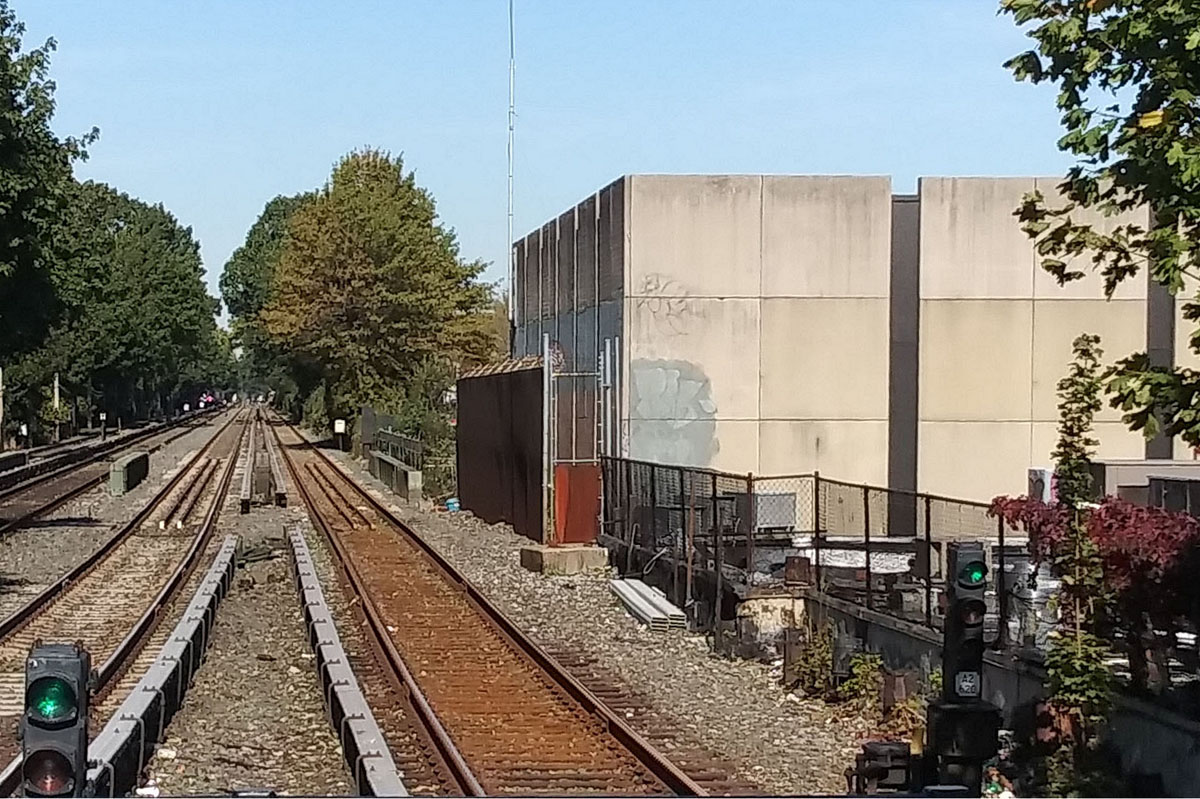
North of Kings Highway Station

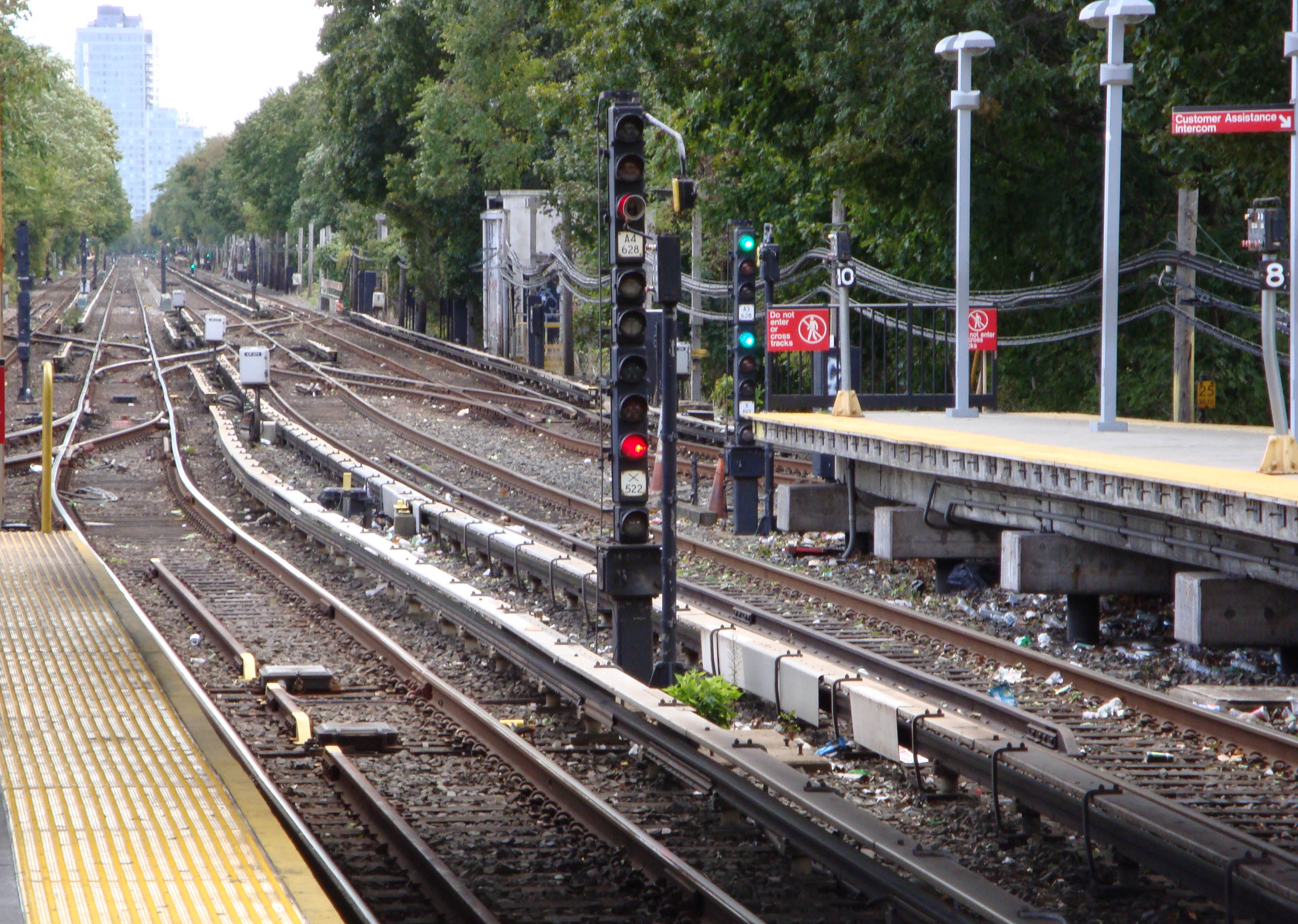
South of Kings Highway Station

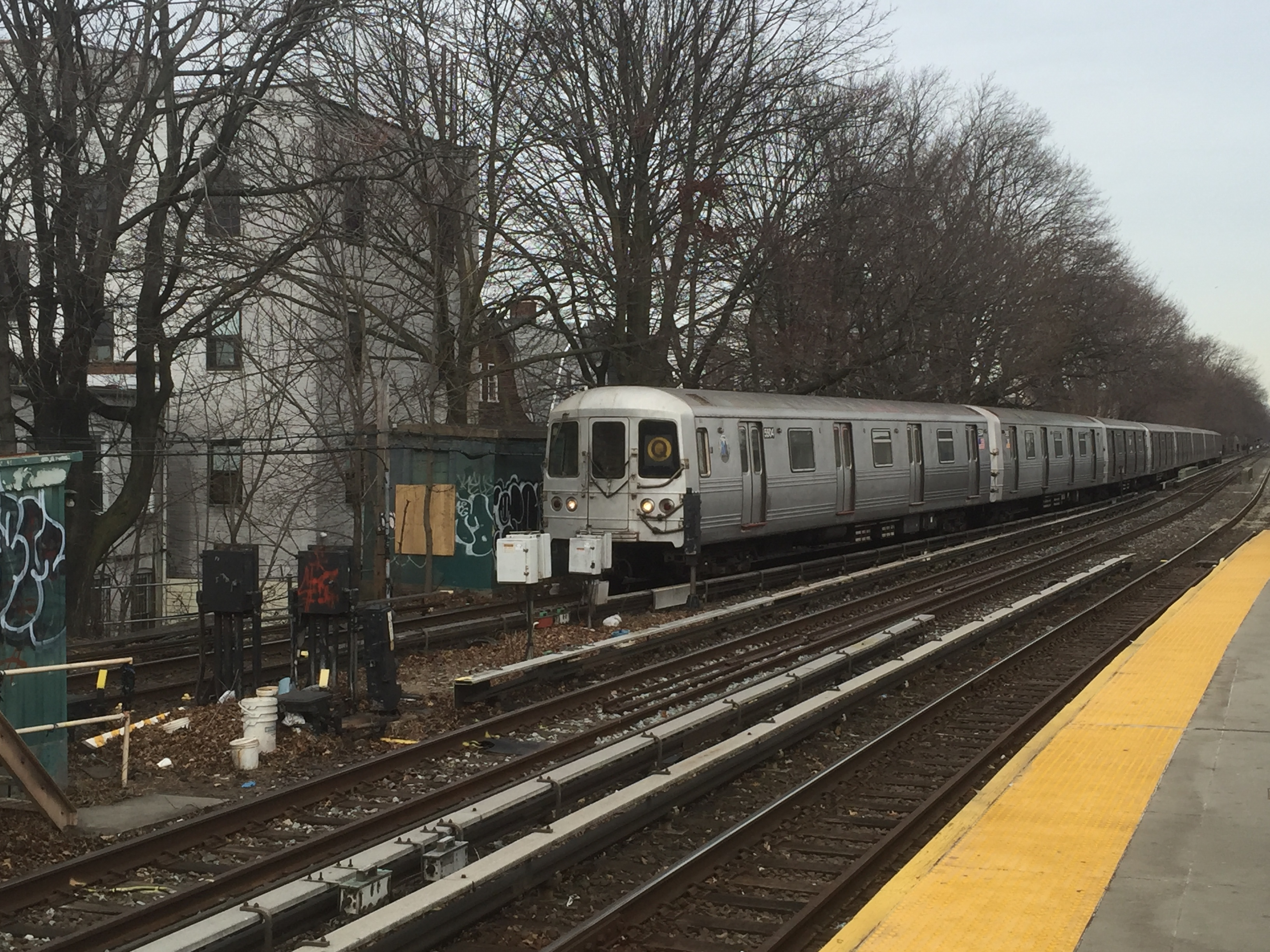
A Coney Island-bound R46 Q Train approaches the station
