= Avenue M station =

New York City Subway station in Brooklyn

Avenue M
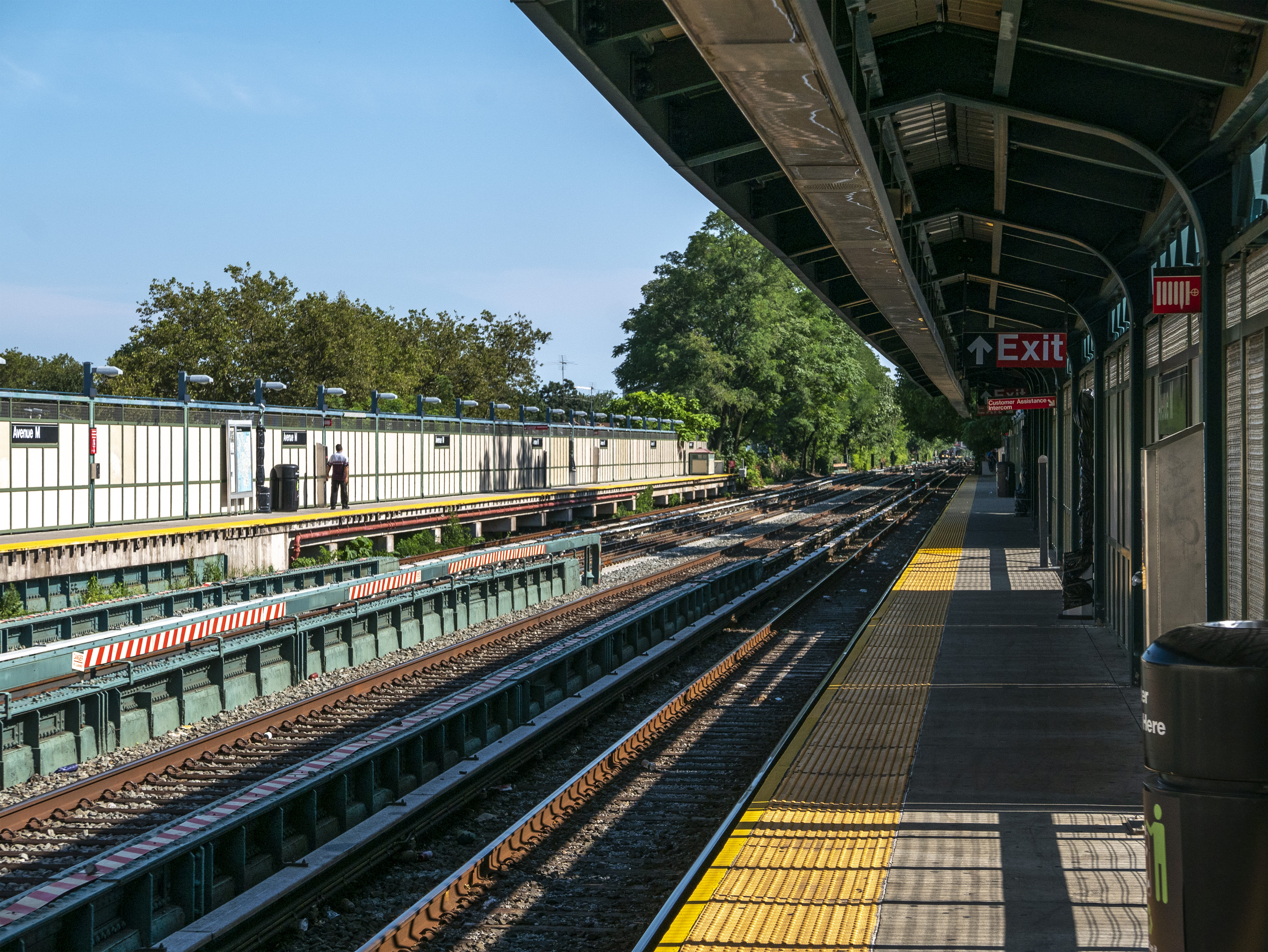
- View from southbound platform

Station statistics
- Address: Avenue M and East 16th Street; Brooklyn, New York
- Borough: Brooklyn
- Locale: Midwood
- Coordinates: 40.618269°N 73.95961°W
- Division: B (BMT)
- Line: BMT Brighton Line
- Services: Q (all times)
- Transit: NYCT Bus: B9
- Structure: Embankment
- Platforms: 2 side platforms
- Tracks: 4

Other information
- Opened: 1878; 148 years ago (BF&CI); 1908; 118 years ago (BRT)
- Former/other names: Elm Avenue, South Greenfield

Traffic
- 2025: 1,317,615 ▲11.1%
- Rank: 257 out of 423
Services
Preceding station	New York City Subway	Following station
Avenue J toward 96th Street	Local	Kings Highway toward Coney Island–Stillwell Avenue
does not stop here
Former services
Preceding station	Long Island Rail Road	Following station
Manhattan Beach Junction Terminus	Manhattan Beach Branch	King's Highway toward Manhattan Beach
Location
Location within New York City Subway
Location within New York City
Location within New York
Track layout
Street map
Station service legend
Symbol	Description
Stops all times	Stops all times

The Avenue M station (formerly South Greenfield, Elm Avenue), is a local station on the BMT Brighton Line of the New York City Subway. It is located in Midwood, Brooklyn, at Avenue M between East 15th and East 16th Streets. The station is served by the Q train at all times.

== History ==
The station originated as the South Greenfield grade station of the Brooklyn, Flatbush and Coney Island Railroad (BF&CI). The line opened in 1878, and South Greenfield was one of the original stations. It also had a connection to the Long Island Rail Road Manhattan Beach Branch. Through a series of bankruptcies, buyouts, and mergers, the BF&CI became the Brooklyn and Brighton Beach Railroad (B&BB, 1887), Brooklyn Rapid Transit (BRT, 1900), Brooklyn-Manhattan Transit (BMT, 1923), New York City Rapid Transit (1940), New York City Transit Authority (1953), and the Metropolitan Transit Authority (1968). Through all the ownership and management changes, station name changes, and reconstruction of this portion of the line from grade to elevated embankment, the station was never shut, and has been in near-continuous operation for close to 150 years. However, the present structure was only built when the line was elevated onto the embankment, between 1903 and 1907. The station was later known as Elm Avenue.

On August 1, 1920, a tunnel under Flatbush Avenue opened, connecting the Brighton Line to the Broadway subway in Manhattan. At the same time, the line's former track connections to the Fulton Street Elevated were severed. Subway trains from Manhattan and elevated trains from Franklin Avenue served Brighton Line stations, sharing the line to Coney Island.

This station underwent reconstruction from September 2009 to December 2011. Both of the station's platforms were rebuilt with new edges, windscreens, and canopies.

== Station layout ==
Situated on an elevated embankment, Avenue M station has two side platforms and four tracks. The side tracks provide the local service to this station, while the two center tracks, used by the B express train on weekdays, bypass the station. This layout, as well as many other station features, closely resemble many other local stations on the elevated portion of the line, especially the Avenue J station.

The 2011 artwork here is called Hare Apparent by Rita MacDonald. It is installed on the walls of the Coney Island-bound platform's staircase and consists ceramic tiling and glass mosaic depicting various species of birds and rabbits.

=== Exits ===
The station house is a brick building underneath the tracks. The entrance to the station house is in line with the storefronts of the south side of Avenue M. There is access from the north side of Avenue M to the Manhattan-bound platform, and although there is a stairway on the Coney Island-bound platform leading to the north side of the street, it is closed.

The Coney Island-bound platform has a double wide staircase going down to the station house while the Manhattan-bound platform has a narrow staircase going down there and a bank of turnstiles leading to another staircase that goes down to the north side of Avenue M. The Coney Island-bound staircase's landing has two exit-only turnstiles leading directly to the street.

== Nearby locations ==
Just west of the station, at Locust Avenue and East 14th Street, is the former location of American Vitagraph, a prolific movie studio that produced silent movies from the turn of the 20th century until 1925, when it was purchased by Warner Bros. A smokestack bearing "Vitagraph Co." can still be seen from the station.

Edward R. Murrow High School is located just to the northeast adjacent to the line.
