= Homecrest, Brooklyn =

Neighborhood in New York City

Homecrest
- Neighborhood of Brooklyn
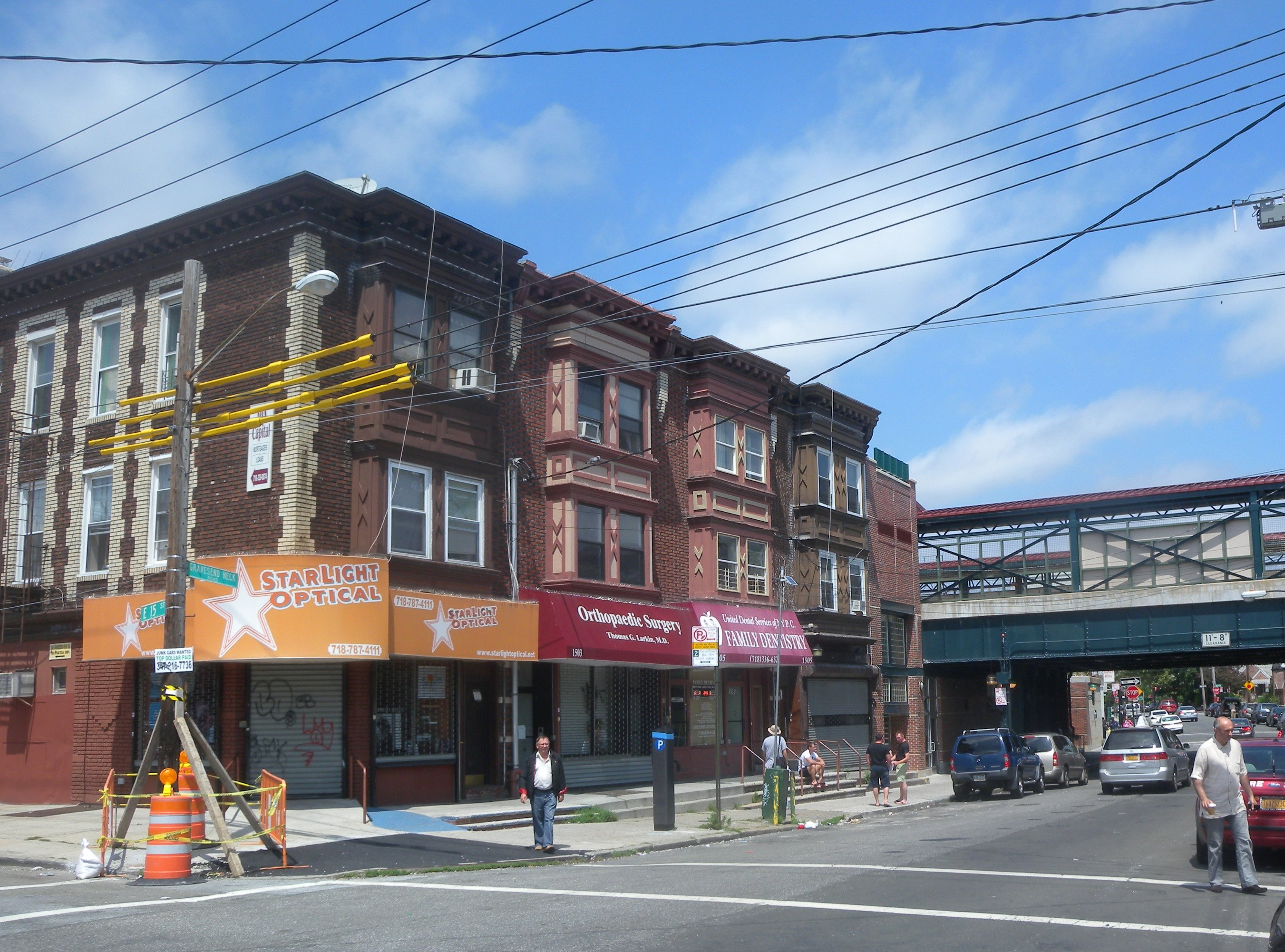
- Neck Road, an important local commercial street
- Interactive map of Homecrest
- Coordinates: 40.601°N 73.951°W
- Country: United States
- State: New York
- City: New York City
- Borough: Brooklyn
- Community District: Brooklyn 15

Area
  - Total: 1.076 sq mi (2.786 km^{2})

Population (2010)
  - Total: 44,316
  - Density: 41,200/sq mi (15,910/km^{2})

Race
  - White: 79.8%
  - Asian: 9.5
  - Hispanic: 8.2
  - Black: 1.0
  - Other: 1.5
- Time zone: UTC−5 (Eastern)
  - Summer (DST): UTC−4 (EDT)
- ZIP Code: 11229
- Area code: 718, 347, 929, and 917

Homecrest is a neighborhood situated in the New York City borough of Brooklyn, sometimes considered as part of Sheepshead Bay. It is bordered by Kings Highway to the north, Avenue X to the south, Coney Island Avenue to the west, and Ocean Avenue to the east.

Homecrest is part of Brooklyn Community District 15, and its primary ZIP Code is 11229. It is patrolled by the 61st Precinct of the New York City Police Department. Politically, Homecrest is represented by the New York City Council's 48th District.

== Demographics ==
Based on data from the 2010 United States census, the population of Homecrest was 44,316, a decrease of 1,363 (3.0%) from the 45,679 counted in 2000. Covering an area of 688.43 acres (278.60 ha), the neighborhood had a population density of 64.4 inhabitants per acre (41,200/sq mi; 15,900/km^{2}).

The racial makeup of the neighborhood was 79.8% (35,363) White, 1.0% (434) African American, 0.1% (36) Native American, 9.5% (4,215) Asian, 0.0% (5) Pacific Islander, 0.2% (71) from other races, and 1.3% (560) from two or more races. Hispanic or Latino of any race were 8.2% (3,632) of the population.

The community has traditionally been home to a large Italian population and has also experienced an influx of people from Latin America, China, Israel, Syria, Russia, and other former Eastern-bloc nations and from South Asia. Avenue U is home to a small but growing Chinese enclave right by the Avenue U subway station.

== Character ==
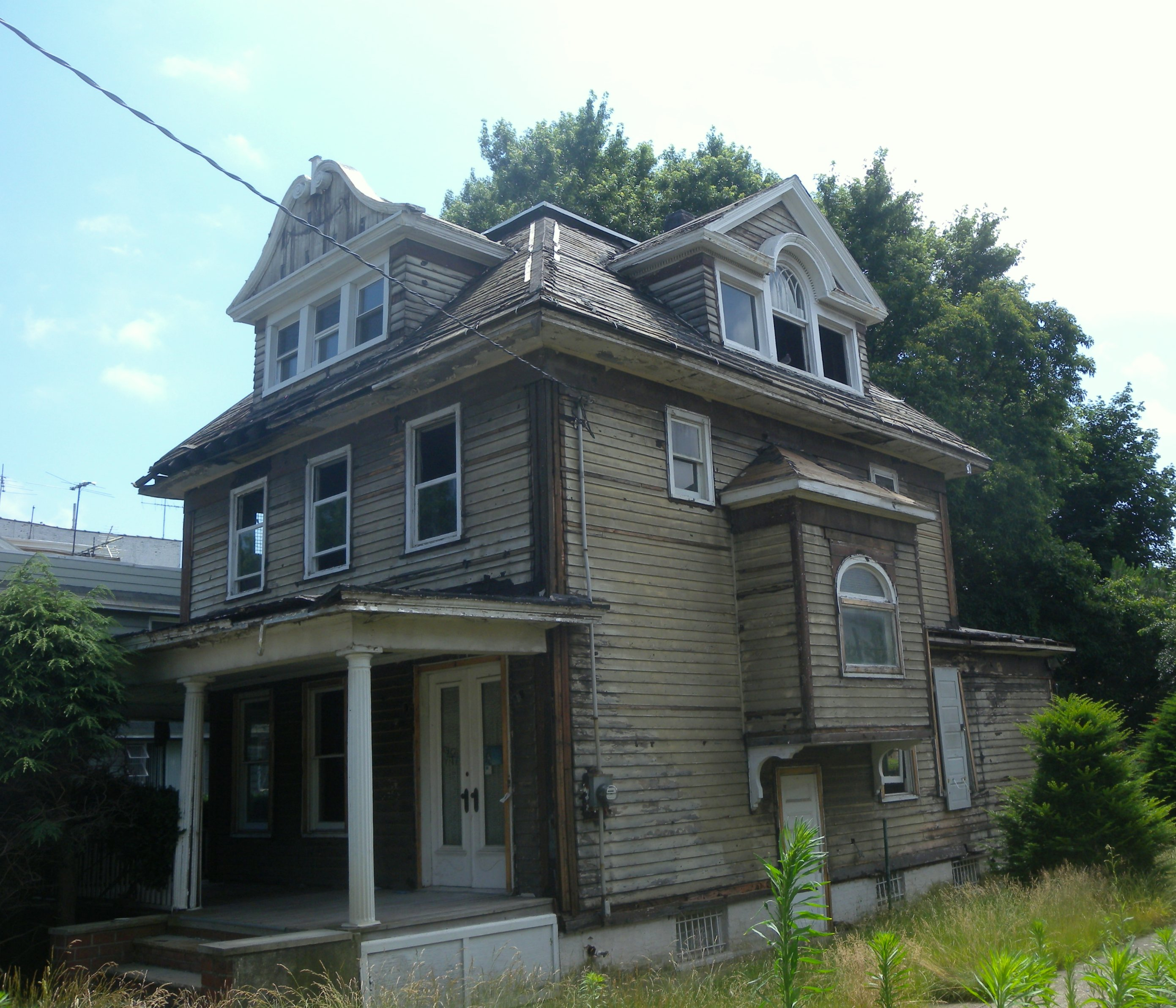
A house on East 14th Street

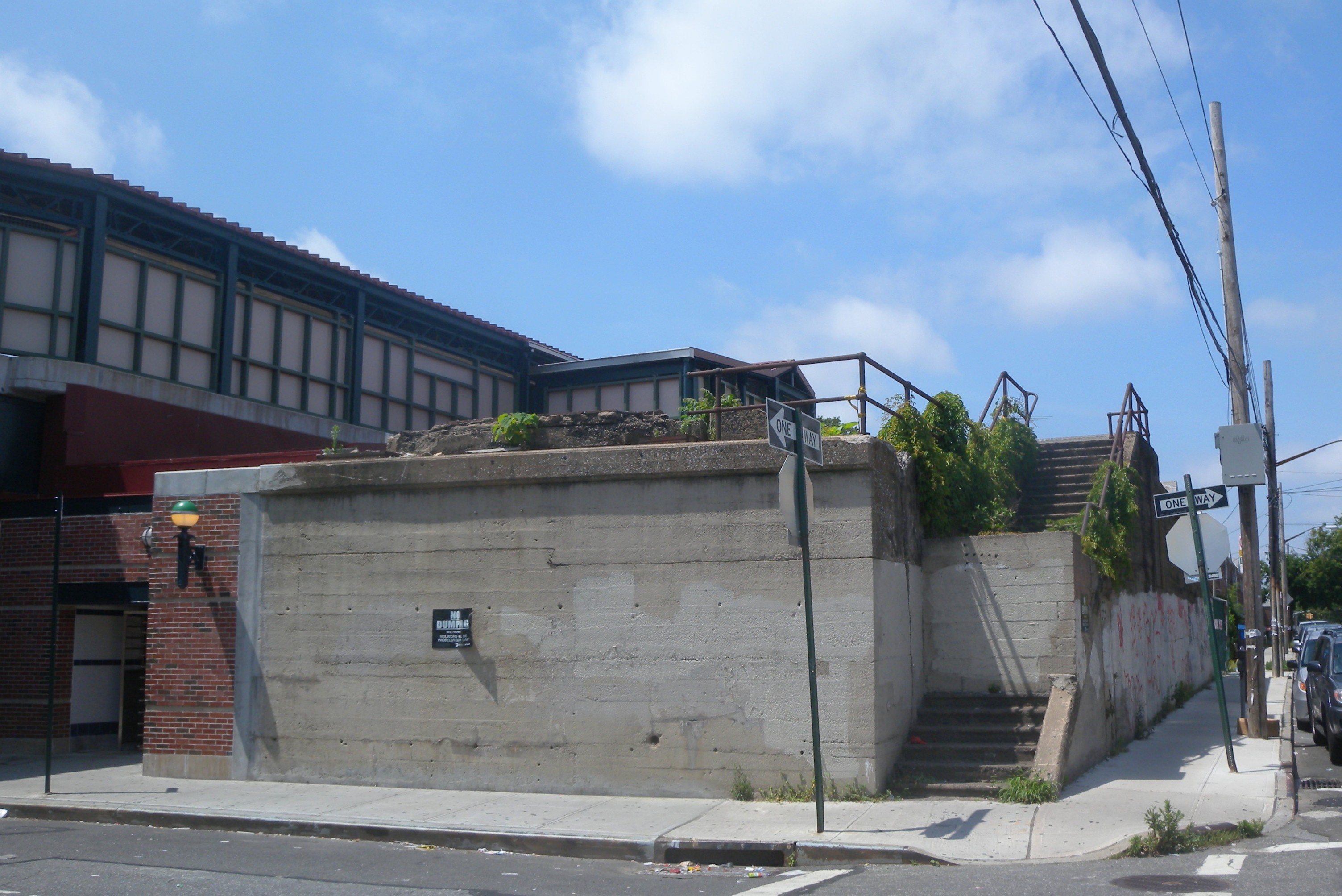
Former Neck Road LIRR station

In the early 21st century many condominiums were built. Many private residential two-story homes have been renovated into mini-mansions, some estimated at a half-million to a million dollars in estimated value. Just south Of Avenue 'V', one-story bungalow type homes are commonplace, as are rows of one-story brick homes with community backyards and driveways.

Kings Highway (to the north) is a major shopping street, while Coney Island Avenue and Avenue U also contain commercial areas.

== Education ==
=== Schools ===
There are a number of public schools, such as P.S. 255 Barbara Reing School (formerly William E. Kelly until 1994), P.S. 153 Homecrest and J.H.S. 234 W. Arthur Cunningham. Other local Schools include St. Edmund Preparatory High School, Nefesh Academy For Girls Yeshiva, Prospect Park Girls Yeshiva, Windmill Montessori School and Touro College Graduate School Of Education and Psychology.

=== Library ===
The Brooklyn Public Library's Homecrest branch is located at 2525 Coney Island Avenue, south of Avenue V.

== Transportation ==
Homecrest is served by the B and Q trains of the New York City Subway's BMT Brighton Line, with stations located at Kings Highway, Avenue U, and Neck Road. The B3, B7, B36, B49, B68, B82 and B82 SBS buses serve the area.

== Parks ==
Public parks are operated by the New York City Department of Parks and Recreation. William E. Kelly Memorial Park is a public park located along Avenue S between East 13th and 14th Streets. It is a large community park featuring courts for tennis, basketball and handball, as well as a playground for kids. Kelly Playground, located at East 16th Street and Avenue S has basketball and handball courts. Students from the adjacent public schools, as well as local Yeshiva schools, often utilize the playground when school is in session. The playground had a wading pool, seesaws and benches. There was an asphalt field between the playground and the basketball courts. Mellett Playground is a playground located along Avenue V between East 13th and East 14th Streets. It is a smaller community park featuring basketball hoops, a handball court as well as a kids playground area.

== Police and crime ==
Homecrest is patrolled by the 61st Precinct of the NYPD, located at 2575 Coney Island Avenue. The 61st Precinct ranked 5th safest out of 69 patrol areas for per-capita crime in 2010.

The 61st Precinct has a lower crime rate than in the 1990s, with crimes across all categories having decreased by 88.2% between 1990 and 2018. The precinct reported 1 murder, 17 rapes, 150 robberies, 170 felony assaults, 169 burglaries, 584 grand larcenies, and 72 grand larcenies auto in 2018.

== Health care ==
New York City Department of Health and Mental Hygiene's Homecrest Health Center is located at 1601 Avenue S, at East 16th Street. It is a Public Health Facility. Coney Island Hospital, New York-Presbyterian and Beth Israel's Kings Highway Division serve the community. Many private outpatient medical facilities have also emerged.

== Religions ==
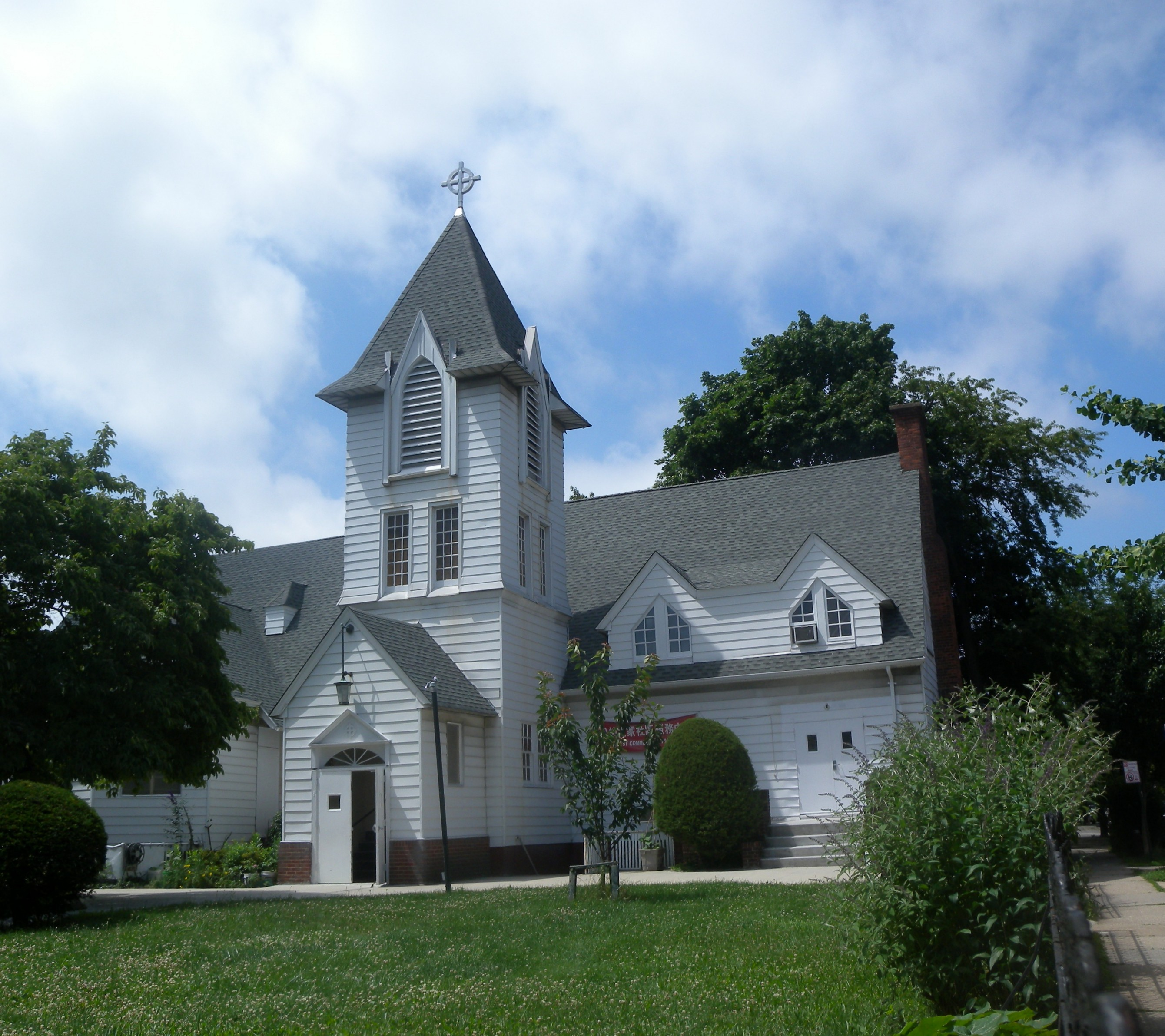
Homecrest Presbyterian

There is a growing population of Jews in the community, served by quite a few Orthodox synagogues - both Ashkenazic and Sephardic. St. Edmunds Roman Catholic Parish serves the community, as does The First Baptist Church Of Sheepshead Bay, The Homecrest Presbyterian Church, and other congregations of various denomination serve the growing Asian population. There is also a Jehovah's Witness Kingdom Hall nearby.

== In popular culture ==
A Bronx Tale (1993) and Brooklyn's Finest (2009) were both filmed at the Brooklyn Public Library's Homecrest branch.

== Notable people ==
- Vicki Gabriner (1942–2018) – civil rights activist

== See also ==
- List of Brooklyn neighborhoods
- Chinatown, Brooklyn
- Chinatown, Manhattan
- Chinatown, Flushing
- Chinatowns in the United States
