= BMT Brighton Line =

New York City Subway line

- The B train provides express service on the BMT Brighton Line on weekdays while the Q train provides local service at all times.

Overview
- Status: Operational
- Owner: City of New York
- Locale: Brooklyn, New York City
- Termini: DeKalb Avenue; Coney Island–Stillwell Avenue
- Stations: 20

Service
- Type: Rapid transit line
- System: New York City Subway
- Operator(s): New York City Transit Authority
- Daily ridership: 148,457 (2023)

History
- Opened: July 2, 1878; 147 years ago
- Last extension: 1920

Technical
- Number of tracks: 2–6
- Character: Open cut, at-grade, underground, embankment and elevated
- Track gauge: 4 ft 8 1/2 in (1,435 mm)
- Electrification: 600V DC third rail
Route map
Express station	Local station	Closed station

The BMT Brighton Line, also known as the Brighton Beach Line, is a rapid transit line in the B Division of the New York City Subway in Brooklyn, New York. Local service is provided at all times by the Q train, but is joined by the B express train on weekdays. The Q train runs the length of the entire line from Coney Island–Stillwell Avenue to the Manhattan Bridge south tracks. The B begins at Brighton Beach and runs via the bridge's north tracks.

The line first opened in 1878 as a two-track surface-level excursion railroad called the Brooklyn, Flatbush and Coney Island Railway, transporting riders from Downtown Brooklyn via a connection with the Long Island Rail Road (LIRR) to the seaside resorts at Coney Island. When its connection with the LIRR was severed in 1883, the line became the Brooklyn and Brighton Beach Railroad, which was eventually acquired by the Brooklyn Rapid Transit Company (BRT, later Brooklyn–Manhattan Transit Corporation [BMT]). From 1903 to 1908, all of the original line's grade crossings were eliminated; This project also widened the line from two to four tracks from Church Avenue to Sheepshead Bay; From 1918 to 1920 the portion of original open-cut right-of-way from Church Avenue to Prospect Park station was widened to four tracks and a new subway alignment was built north of the Prospect Park station. The northern part of the original line became the modern-day BMT Franklin Avenue Line, which still runs today. In subsequent years, numerous improvements were made to the Brighton Line.

== History ==
=== Origins ===
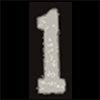
Route designation on BMT Triplex equipment

The Brighton Line opened from the Willink Plaza entrance of Prospect Park (modern intersection of Flatbush and Ocean Avenues and Empire Boulevard, now the Prospect Park station on both the renamed Brighton and the Franklin Avenue Shuttle lines) to Brighton Beach (modern Coney Island Avenue at the shoreline) on July 2, 1878, and the full original line on August 18. It was an excursion railroad – the Brooklyn, Flatbush and Coney Island Railway – to bring beachgoers from downtown Brooklyn (via a connection with the Long Island Rail Road) to the seashore at Coney Island on the Atlantic Ocean, at a location named Brighton Beach at the same time the railroad arrived. It has been known since its opening as the Brighton Beach Line but is now described as the Brighton Line in MTA literature and in public usage.

After losing its connection with the Long Island Rail Road in 1883, the railroad fell on hard times, reorganizing as the Brooklyn and Brighton Beach Railroad. Seeking a new route for its excursion business and its local trade in communities along the way, it formed an agreement with the Kings County Elevated Railway to connect to its Fulton Street Line, which gave access to the new Brooklyn Bridge and Manhattan passengers. This was accomplished in 1896.

A series of mergers and leases put the Brighton Beach Line in the hands of the Brooklyn Rapid Transit Company (BRT), a holding company which eventually controlled most of the rapid transit, streetcar, and bus lines in Brooklyn and part of Queens. The line was electrified with trolley wire and, for a time, trolleys from several surface routes and elevated trains operated together on the line.

The BRT was reorganized as the Brooklyn–Manhattan Transit Corporation (BMT) in 1923. In 1940, the BMT was purchased by the City of New York, and operation passed to the city's Board of Transportation, which already operated the city-built Independent Subway System (IND).

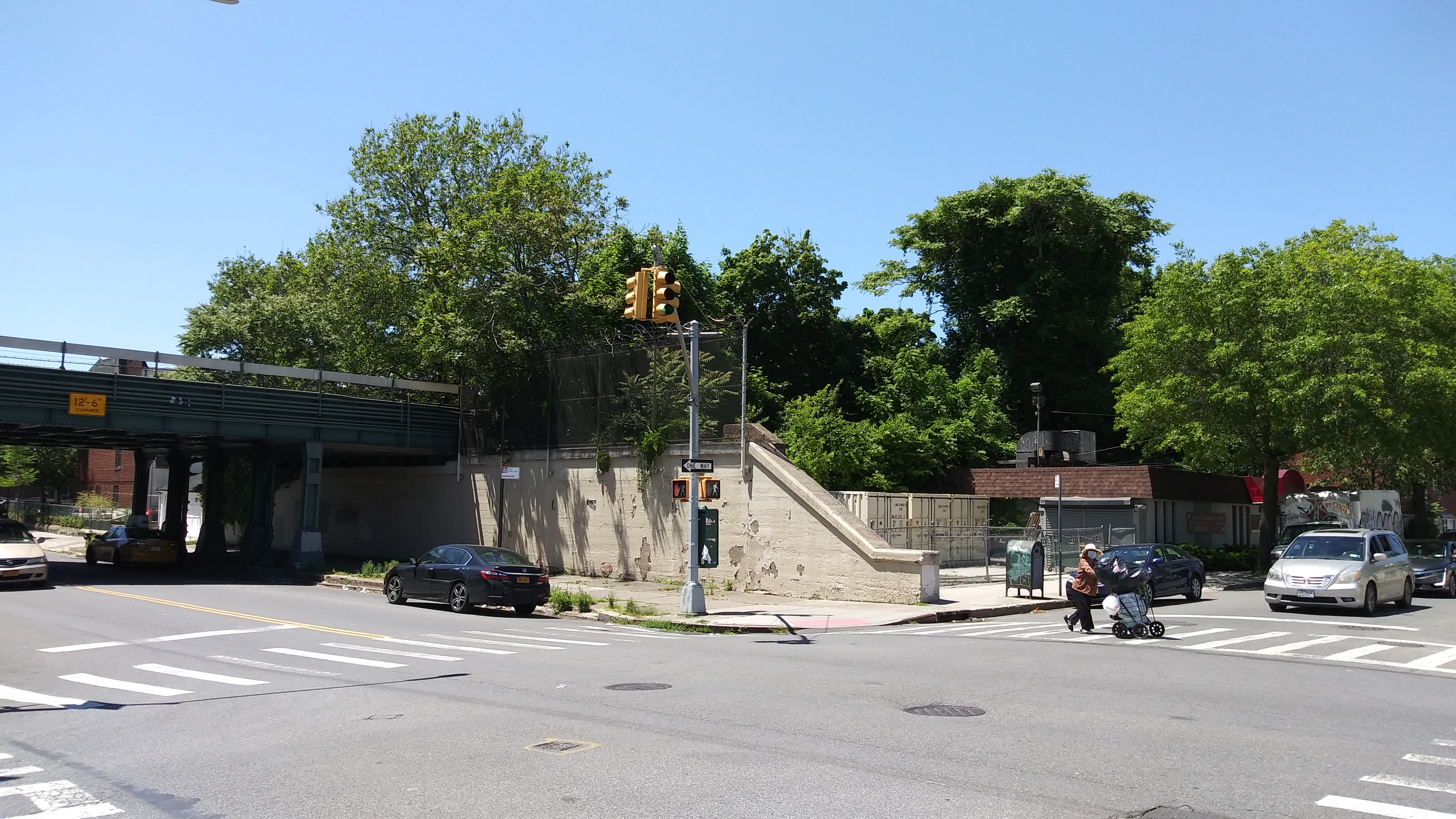
BMT Brighton Line was built next to right of way of LIRR. LIRR tracks were removed but the abutment placement still indicated where the right of way was

The original line was a two-tracked high-speed surface steam railroad operating from Bedford Station, at Atlantic Avenue near Franklin Avenue in the City of Brooklyn, at which point it made a physical connection to the Long Island Rail Road's Atlantic Branch. From Bedford the line ran on a surface private right-of-way several blocks south to Park Place, which it crossed at grade, and then in an open cut with street overpasses through what is now Crown Heights and Flatbush, as far as Church Lane (now Church Avenue) in the Town and Village of Flatbush. From that point the line continued on the surface to a point at current Beverley Road between Marlborough Road (East 15th Street) and East 16th Street, curving southeast and running on the surface between the lines of the latter streets through the Towns of Flatbush and Gravesend to Sheepshead Bay, then turning southerly to reach the beach at Brighton Beach on Coney Island in the Town of Gravesend.

The line was extended westward from Brighton Beach in 1903, so that it could terminate with the former Prospect Park and Coney Island Railroad at Culver Depot in Coney Island. Passengers, with this short extension, were given access to the developing area of Coney Island. The Culver Depot became the center of operations for the Culver Line and the Brighton Beach Line.

=== Grade crossing eliminations, 1903–1908 and 1918–1920 ===
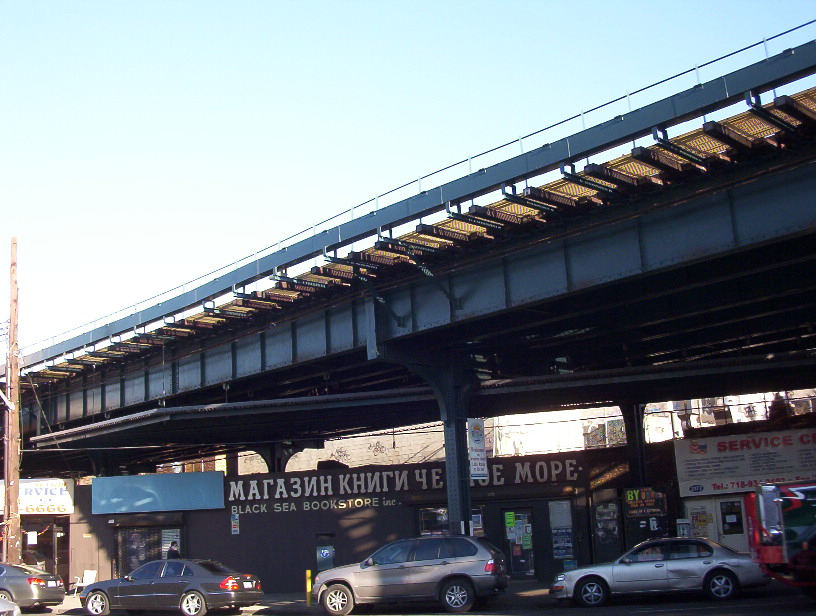
The Brighton Line passing over Coney Island Avenue in Brighton Beach

In 1903, the New York State Legislature created the Brooklyn Grade Crossing Elimination Commission (BGCEC) to eliminate all grade crossings on the Brighton Beach Line and the Bay Ridge Line of the Long Island Rail Road. The city was supposed to cover half of the costs, not exceeding $1 million, while the railroads were to cover the other half of the costs. The work started on December 30, 1905, and was completed in 1908. A short piece of two-tracked elevated railroad was built from the ramp connecting to the Fulton Street Elevated as far as Park Place, where the original 1878 open cut began. From the end of that original cut south of Church Avenue, the line was wholly rebuilt as a four-track railroad with express and local stations to a point south of Neptune Avenue at the border of Coney Island, continuing along its original right-of-way to Brighton Beach station. The portion from Church Avenue to Avenue H was placed in a depressed open cut, while the portion from Avenue H to south of Sheepshead Bay was raised onto an earthen embankment, primarily with earth excavated from the open-cut portion and from the Bay Ridge Improvement of the Long Island Rail Road. The separation of the railroad grade allowed the line's trolley wire north of Sheepshead Bay to be replaced with ground-level third rail.

The work by the BGCEC left the line between Park Place and Church Avenue in substantially its original condition from steam railroad days. Between 1918 and 1920, however, further work rebuilt the portion between Prospect Park and Church Avenue as a four-track line. At the same time, the remaining portion of the line south of Neptune Avenue was replaced with a four-track elevated structure, including a four- to six-track elevated line extension, connecting the Brighton Line to the new Coney Island terminal at Surf and Stillwell Avenues. This same work rerouted mainline Brighton Beach trains from the Fulton Street elevated line via a new deep tunnel under Flatbush Avenue to connect to the BMT Fourth Avenue Line at DeKalb Avenue station, where trains could access the new BMT Broadway subway. This work was done as a part of the Dual Contracts.

A spur south of Neck Road, which split to Sheepshead Bay Race Track, was in use from 1909 to around 1929. The single-track spur was part of the Long Island Rail Road's Manhattan Beach Branch, and it ran at street level to Ocean Avenue between Avenues X and Y, where it terminated at a six-track terminal.

=== Brighton–Franklin Line ===
The St. Felix Street and Flatbush Avenue Connection opened on August 1, 1920, providing direct service between the Brighton Line and midtown Manhattan. With the opening of the connection, the original portion of the line between the Fulton Street Elevated and the link to the new subway at Prospect Park became a secondary line, known as Brighton–Franklin, and now known as the BMT Franklin Avenue Line. At times through services (including expresses) operated on mainline Brighton tracks to Coney Island. Some special weekend trains even operated beyond Coney Island back to Manhattan via the BMT Sea Beach Line express tracks and the BMT Fourth Avenue Subway. This service was variously known as Franklin–Nassau and as the Coney Island Express, but its popular name was the "Sunny Sunday Summer Special," because it was only supposed to operate as needed on the hottest beach-going days.

In Fiscal Year 1930, an additional control area with staircases to the platforms at Kings Highway were constructed, and additional stairs were added at Avenue M, Avenue U, and Avenue J.

Through services gradually diminished on the Brighton–Franklin, and after 1963 it became a pure shuttle, operating between Franklin Avenue station at Fulton Street and Prospect Park station, where it connects with mainline Brighton Beach trains.

During the era of route contraction from 1940 to about 1975, the Franklin Avenue Shuttle seemed a prime candidate for abandonment; its physical structure had been allowed to deteriorate and its service steadily curtailed. The New York City fiscal crisis of the '70s and the recession in 1990 contributed to plans to discontinue the line. By the 1990s the Franklin Avenue Shuttle was known as the "ghost train". It was shrunk in size to only two cars and the Dean Street station was closed. The entire line was under consideration for abandonment, but community pressure forced the MTA to rebuild rather than abandon the line, and as a result, most of the supporting infrastructure and stations were completely rehabilitated in 1998–1999 at a cost of $74 million and reopened in 1999.

=== Platform extensions, track repairs, and Stillwell Avenue reconstruction ===
On June 16, 1964, Mayor Robert F. Wagner Jr. approved the award of a $2,283,933 contract for the second phase of work to extend platforms along the Brighton Line. The platforms were to be lengthened to 615 feet (187 m) feet to accommodate a ten-car train of 60-foot (18 m) long cars, or a nine-car train of 67-foot (20 m) long cars, instead of the existing 8-cars. The contract for the first phase of work had been let the previous year for the seven stations between Atlantic Avenue and Newkirk Avenue. The platform extensions at these stations were completed during the 1964–1965 fiscal year. The contract for the second phase called for the extension of platforms at the ten remaining stations on the line from Avenue H to Stillwell Avenue. Work on the second contract was still ongoing in 1965.

Between April 26, 1986, and October 26, 1986, service was disrupted due to track repairs and other construction work along the line. The two local tracks were completely rebuilt between Prospect Park and Newkirk Avenue, in two phases, with the Manhattan-bound track rebuilt first between April and July, and the Brooklyn-bound track rebuilt between July and October. A temporary platform was built at Cortelyou Road while Beverley Road and Parkside Avenue were closed in one direction because temporary platforms could not be built at these locations. To reduce congestion, skip-stop service was implemented on weekdays, which lasted until 1988.

From September 8, 2002, to May 23, 2004, service was suspended west of Brighton Beach due to allow rebuilding of the Coney Island–Stillwell Avenue terminal station, which had deteriorated due to the effects of salt water corrosion and deferred maintenance.

=== Brighton Line Station Reconstruction Project ===
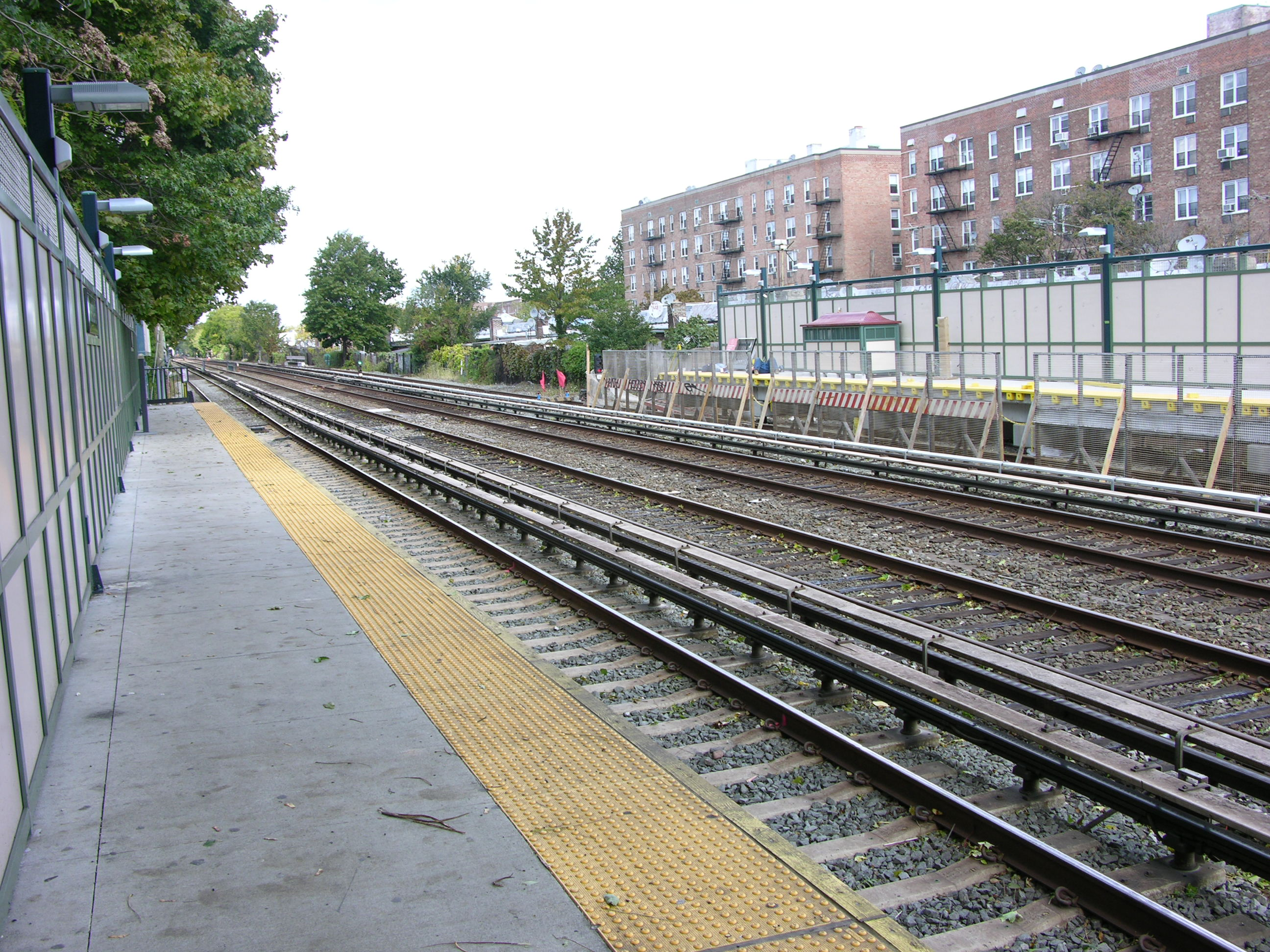
The platform at Avenue U during reconstruction.

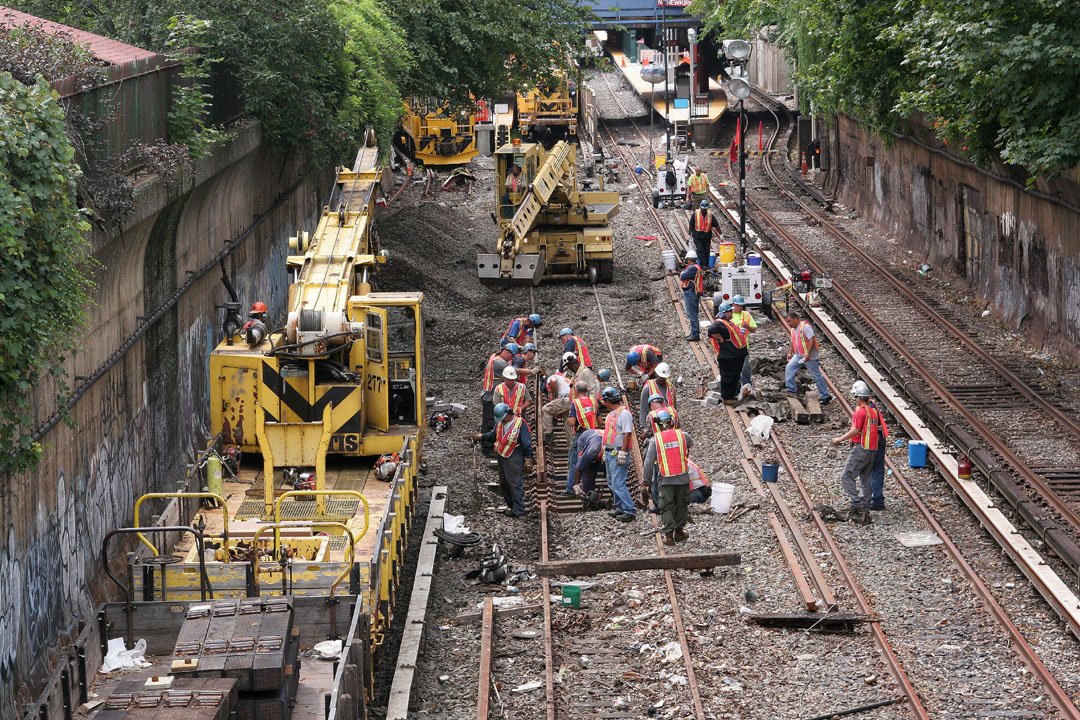
Track work at Newkirk Plaza in September 2011 marking the end of the station reconstruction project.

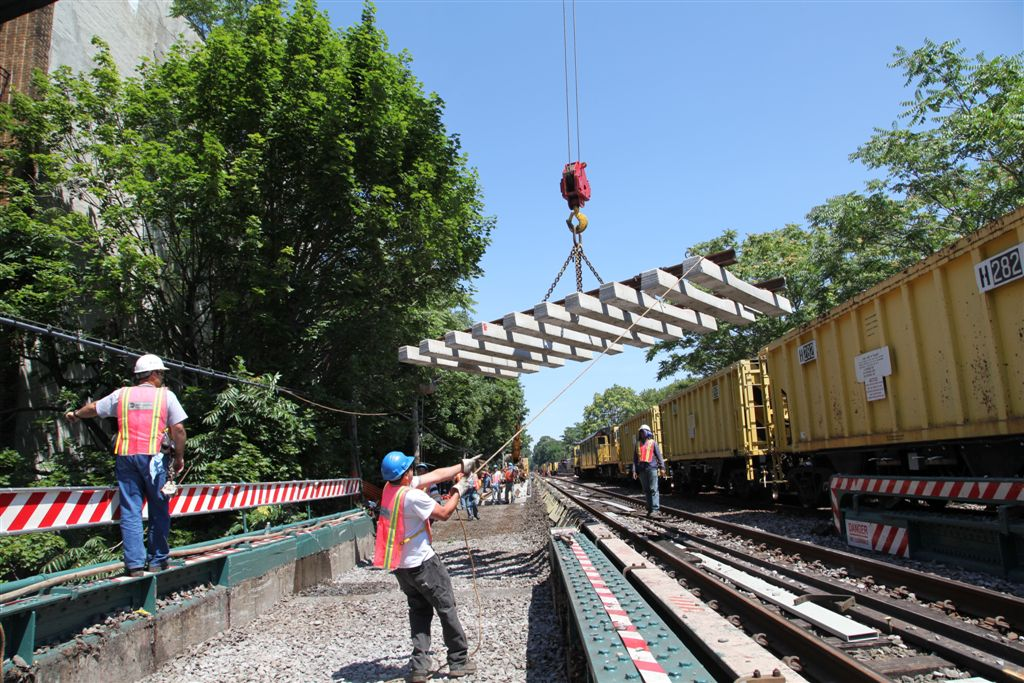
Replacing of tracks on the BMT Brighton Line

In 2007, the MTA announced that it would reconstruct seven stations between Newkirk Avenue and Neck Road, inclusive. On December 8, 2008, the first phase of the Brighton Line Station Reconstruction Project began. The Coney Island-bound platforms at Avenue U and Neck Road were closed for rebuilding and all southbound trains ran on the express track from Kings Highway to Sheepshead Bay.

On September 14, 2009, the second phase of the project involving all stations from Newkirk Plaza to Kings Highway began. Express B train service was suspended and all trains ran local in both directions for the next two years. Over the next two weeks, temporary platforms were placed on the Manhattan-bound express track at Kings Highway and Avenue J for southbound service. On September 28, the southbound platforms of Avenue H, Avenue J, Avenue M, and Kings Highway began rebuilding. South of Cortelyou Road, a single crossover connected the southbound local track with the express one and all southbound trains skipped Avenue H and Avenue M.

On January 18, 2010, Coney Island-bound service was restored at Avenue U and Neck Road. The Manhattan-bound platforms were closed for rebuilding until October 25 and all northbound trains operated on the express track from Sheepshead Bay to Kings Highway.

On September 13, Coney Island-bound service to Avenue H and Avenue M was restored and the two southbound tracks south of Cortelyou Road were separated. Over the next two weeks, the temporary platforms at Avenue J and Kings Highway were moved to the southbound express track and the two northbound tracks were connected to each other north of Newkirk Plaza. On September 27, the Manhattan-bound platforms of those three stations as well as Avenues H and M, which were then being bypassed, began rehabilitation and all northbound service was directed to the express track until Cortelyou Road. The platforms of all stations reopened on September 12, 2011, and B express service was restored on October 3. However, rehabilitation work that did not affect service continued until the end of the year.

As part of the project, station platforms were replaced and widened, windscreens and canopies were replaced, station lighting was upgraded, new public address systems were installed, and new station agent booths were put into place. In addition, ADA-compliant elevators were installed at Kings Highway, the historic station house at Avenue H was restored, an additional southbound entrance was installed at Avenue H, and additional fare entrances were created to the northbound platform sections of the Avenue M and Avenue J stations.

== Service patterns ==
The following services use part or all of the Brighton Line:

	Service			Section of line
	Weekdays	Weekends	Late Nights	Section of line
"B" train	express	no service		north of Brighton Beach
"Q" train	local			entire line

Since 1920, the primary service on the line has been through to Manhattan rather than over the tracks now used by the Franklin Avenue Shuttle. Local service has run all the time, while express service has generally been provided during weekday rush hours and later middays. Until the 1960s, all service on the line north of Prospect Park was labeled 1.

Standard local service ran through the Montague Street Tunnel and along the BMT Broadway Line local tracks; service instead crossed the Manhattan Bridge north tracks and ran express under Broadway during Broadway theatre hours (7:30 pm to midnight). Over the years, the local bridge service was expanded, and the local tunnel service ended up only from 6 am to 7 pm. Express service over the bridge to the Broadway express tracks, initially during rush hours, was also expanded to 6 am to 7 pm. The three patterns were assigned letter designations in the early 1960s: Q express via bridge, QT local via tunnel, and QB local via bridge.

The Chrystie Street Connection opened in late 1967, and almost all Brighton Line trains were removed from Broadway. The Q and QB were both combined with the D on the IND Sixth Avenue Line, running express during the day and local at other times. The daytime QT local was combined with the Jamaica local and express (then #15) to form the QJ, running through the tunnel to the BMT Nassau Street Line, which also replaced the limited rush hour Brighton “Bankers’ Specials” to Nassau Street. The only Brighton-Broadway service was a new QB, with a limited number of runs in the peak direction at rush hours on the local Brighton and express Broadway tracks. There were also a limited number of NX trains from Brighton Beach via Coney Island and the Sea Beach express tracks, then up Broadway, a short-lived service that also attempted to compensate for the elimination of major Brighton/Broadway service. (The two QB services were distinct; the old QB had run at non-peak times; this new QB had the same name and almost the same route but was a different service.)

The QJ's Brighton section was replaced with an extension of the M in 1973. In 1985, the QB was renamed Q as the subway eliminated the double letter naming system for local routes. Reconstruction of the Manhattan Bridge subway tracks began, which would continue until 2004. Though the same general service patterns remained on the Brighton Line, all trains were sent over the bridge and onto the Broadway or Sixth Avenue Line, depending on which set of tracks was open. From 1986 to 1988, the south side (Broadway) was in service, and the D continued to serve the line at all times, the M was rerouted onto the BMT Fourth Avenue Line and Q service now also ran during middays. Because of the concurrent track and infrastructure repairs on the Brighton Line, express service was suspended for two years. As tracks between Prospect Park and Newkirk Avenue were rebuilt, the D and Q provided skip-stop service between Newkirk Avenue and Sheepshead Bay on weekdays. D trains served Neck Road, Avenue M and Avenue H; the Q skipped those stops, serving Avenue U and Avenue J, while both trains served Kings Highway. By 1987, as the line's reconstruction progressed, the weekday skip-stop pattern expanded to Prospect Park, with D trains serving Beverley Road while Q trains served Cortelyou Road and Parkside Avenue, with Church Avenue as a mutual station.

On December 11, 1988, the Bridge's north (Sixth Avenue) tracks reopened; at this time, the skip-stop pattern was eliminated, and the D became a full-time local service to Stillwell Avenue, while the Q ran express on weekdays to Brighton Beach. Both trains ran via Sixth Avenue Express. From April 30 to November 12, 1995, the Manhattan Bridge fully closed during middays and weekends. D service in Brooklyn was suspended during these hours; the Q replaced it, running local to Stillwell Avenue and via the Montague Street Tunnel and Broadway Express.

The 2001 shifting of trains back to the south side (Broadway) led to the D only running north of Midtown Manhattan; the Q replaced the D as the full-time Brighton Local while the Brighton express portion of the Q became the diamond <Q>. When both sides of the bridge reopened in 2004, the <Q> was discontinued and replaced by the B in Brooklyn. The B was restored to the Brighton Line rather than the West End Line, where it had run from 1967 to 2001, to combine two weekday-only services and because Brighton Line residents preferred Broadway Service, the Q was kept as the full-time local. In effect, this flipped the B and D services, as the D was transferred to the West End Line following the bridge's reopening.

== Description ==
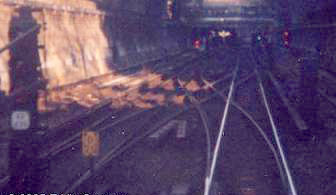
A double crossover linking both express tracks located between Prospect Park and Church Avenue.

The modern-day line shows a mix of its various re-buildings.

=== DeKalb Avenue to Prospect Park ===
The underground portion from the DeKalb Avenue connection to the BMT Fourth Avenue Line was built in 1920 as part of the Dual Contracts. This section contains two additional stations: the Atlantic Avenue–Barclays Center and Seventh Avenue. Between Atlantic Avenue and Grand Army Plaza, the Brighton Line tunnel runs beside, under, and between the tracks of the Interborough Rapid Transit Company (IRT)'s Eastern Parkway Line. The Eastern Parkway Line was built simultaneously with this part of the Brighton Line, and also opened in 1920.

At Prospect Park, the Brighton subway tunnel emerges into an open cut. The Prospect Park station contains a cross-platform interchange with the BMT Franklin Avenue Line, which is used by the S train. Franklin Avenue Line trains use the northbound local track, while the express tracks in both directions are used by the Brighton Line trains; the southbound local track is not in service. The former alignment of the Brighton Line ran along what is now the Franklin Avenue Line, which had been built as a surface railway in 1878 and rebuilt as a grade-separated open-cut and embankment line in 1905.

=== Prospect Park to Brighton Beach ===
South of Prospect Park, the Brighton Line widens to a four-track line for much of the rest of the route. The B continues on the inner tracks and runs to Brighton Beach, serving only express stations, while the Q splits to the outer tracks, serving all stops until the end of the line at Coney Island–Stillwell Avenue. The original line built in 1878 ran in a two-track open cut. This segment was rebuilt in 1918 to 1920 to a four track line with an express station at Prospect Park, a local station at Parkside Avenue (replacing the original station at Woodruff Avenue) and another express station at Church Avenue. The line features slightly sloped and capped reinforced concrete walls, as well as cut-and-cover tunnels underneath cross-streets.

The segment between Church Avenue to Avenue H is a result of the BGCEC rebuilding program of 1903–1907. Just south of the tunnel under Church Avenue, the construction of the cut wall visibly changes. Steel trestles carry the streets above the line, giving it a more open appearance. Cottage-style station houses are suspended over the line at local stations at Beverley and Cortelyou Roads, and at the express station at Newkirk Plaza. Past Newkirk Plaza the line continues in an open cut, then begins to rise to street level at the north end of Avenue H station.

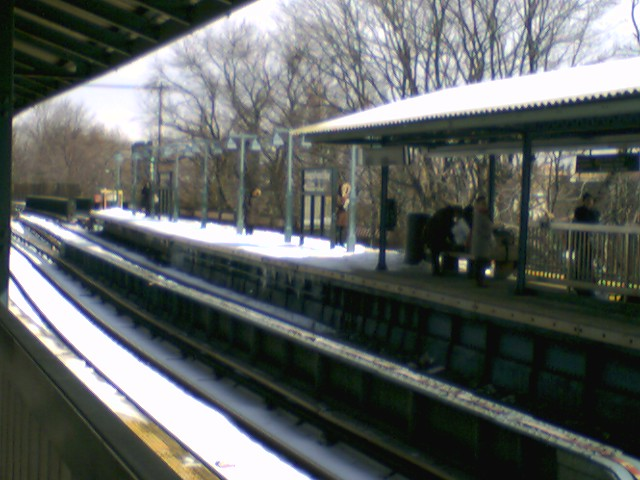
Sheepshead Bay station, looking northward across the express tracks

The station house at Avenue H is a wooden structure built in 1905 and originally housed a real estate office for the sale of homes in the new Fiske Terrace community surrounding the station. The building was designated a landmark by the New York City Landmarks Preservation Commission in 2004. At this point the line now runs on an earthen embankment with local stations at Avenue H, Avenue J and Avenue M, an express station at Kings Highway, local stops at Avenue U and (Gravesend) Neck Road, and an express station at Sheepshead Bay (formerly Shore Road). All of the station houses for these stops are located beneath the tracks at street level.

The line continues south on the 1907 embankment to a bridge over Neptune Avenue. At this point the BGCEC roadbed ends. Prior to the Dual Contracts rebuild in the late 1910s, the line descended to the surface on two single track concrete and steel ramps to operate on the surface to Brighton Beach. As part of the 1918–1920 Dual Contracts work, all four tracks now continue on a steel elevated structure to the junction of Coney Island and Brighton Beach Avenues, where the line turns west onto Brighton Beach Avenue and enters the Brighton Beach station.

=== Brighton Beach to Coney Island ===
Bilevel elevated section, from West 8th Street to Stillwell Avenue-Coney Island station. Its lower level is used by IND Culver Line

Traveling west from Brighton Beach station, the line operates on a six track elevated structure over Brighton Beach Avenue. One track splits from each pair of local and express tracks in each direction. Only the outer two tracks are currently used for revenue service, carrying Q trains. The inner four are layup tracks used to store B trains that terminate at Brighton Beach; the innermost two tracks are the former right-of-way of the Sea View Railway, which originally provided service west of Brighton Beach.

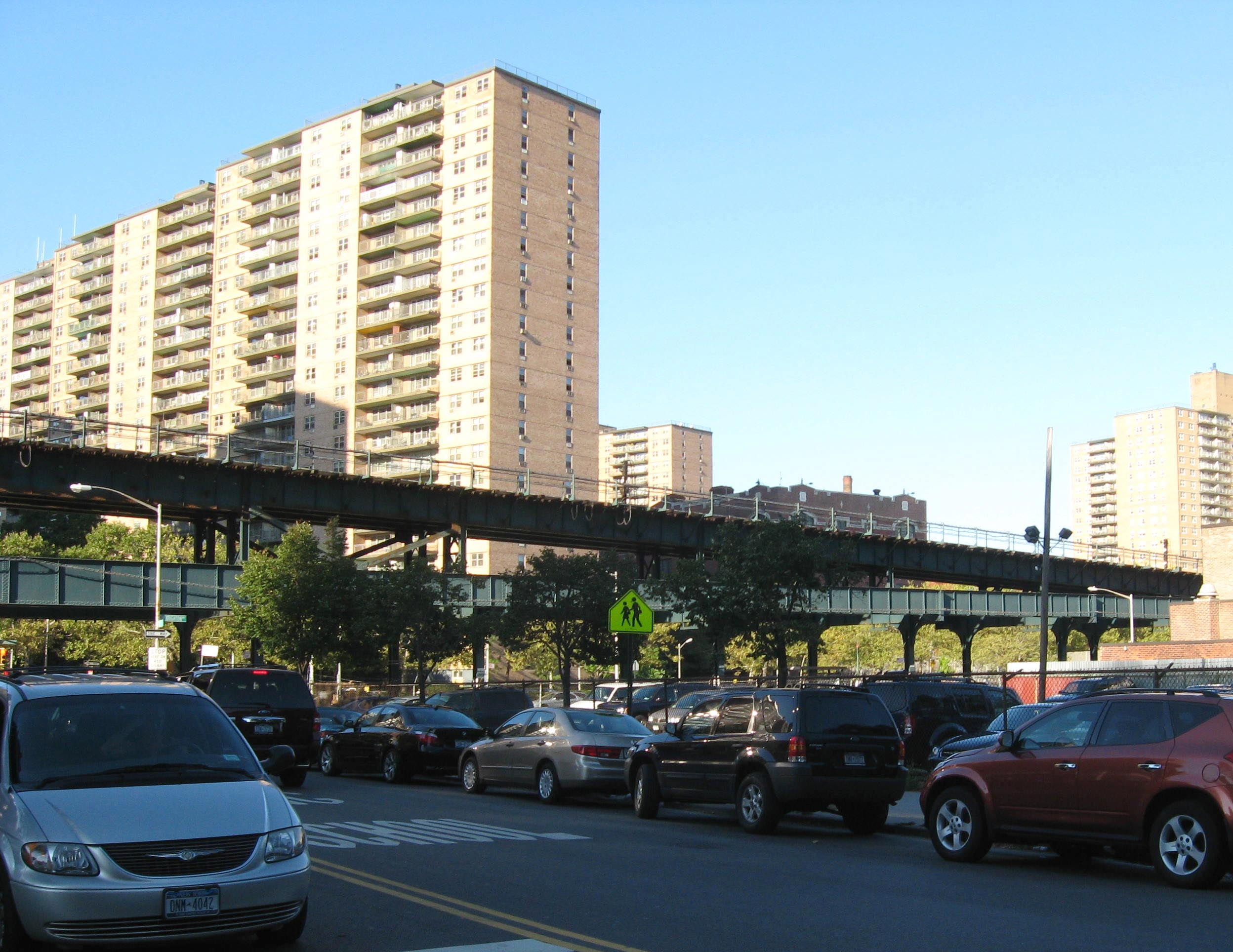
Crossing West 5th Street

Each of the two layup tracks between the local and express tracks ends before Ocean Parkway station, while the innermost and outermost tracks stop at the station. The outer tracks merge with the inner tracks, and the inner tracks climb to an upper level. The outer trackways remain at the same elevation, and shortly afterward merge with the two tracks of the IND Culver Line (F and <F> trains), which merge into the structure from the north. Both lines then stop at the West Eighth Street–New York Aquarium station, a double-level steel structure with two tracks on each level. The Brighton trains occupy the upper level and the Culver Line trains the lower. Both lines then enter the 8-track Stillwell Avenue terminal, which was built in 1917–1920 and renovated in 2001–2004. The Brighton trains occupy tracks 3 and 4.

== Station listing ==
Station service legend
Stops all times	Stops 24 hours a day
Stops all times except late nights	Stops every day during daytime hours only
Stops late nights only	Stops every day during overnight hours only
Stops weekdays during the day	Stops during weekday daytime hours only
Stops rush hours only	Stops during weekday rush hours only
Time period details
Disabled access	Station is compliant with the Americans with Disabilities Act
↑	Station is compliant with the Americans with Disabilities Act in the indicated direction only
↓	Station is compliant with the Americans with Disabilities Act in the indicated direction only
	Elevator access to mezzanine only

Neighborhood (approximate)	Disabled access	Station	Tracks	Services	Opened	Transfers and notes
Begins as a merge of the Montague Street Tunnel (N R W ), BMT Broadway Line express tracks via the Manhattan Bridge (N Q ), and IND Sixth Avenue Line express tracks via the Manhattan Bridge (B D ).
Downtown Brooklyn	Disabled access	DeKalb Avenue	bridge, tunnel	B D N Q R W	August 1, 1920	6 tracks; only four outer tracks stop at this station. Within station, outermost tracks are used by trains using the bridge, and center tracks are used by trains using the tunnel. Innermost tracks are used by BMT Fourth Avenue Line express trains from the bridge.
Downtown Brooklyn	Split with the BMT Fourth Avenue Line (D N R W )					
Downtown Brooklyn	Disabled access	Atlantic Avenue–Barclays Center	all	B Q	August 1, 1920	2 3 4 5 (IRT Eastern Parkway Line); D N R W (BMT Fourth Avenue Line); Connection to LIRR at Atlantic Terminal
Park Slope		Seventh Avenue	all	B Q	August 1, 1920	
Flatbush	Two outer local tracks begin from merge of the BMT Franklin Avenue Line (S )					
Flatbush	Disabled access	Prospect Park	express	B Q	April 4, 1905	S (BMT Franklin Avenue Line)
Flatbush	Disabled access	Prospect Park	local	S (northbound track)	April 4, 1905	B Q Prior to the 1920 expansion, the Brighton Line followed the current Franklin Avenue Line north of this station.
Flatbush		Parkside Avenue	local	Q	April 4, 1905	
Flatbush	Disabled access	Church Avenue	all	B Q	August 23, 1907	Originally called Flatbush station, or sometimes Church Lane, Flatbush.
Flatbush		Beverley Road	local	Q	August 23, 1907	
Flatbush		Cortelyou Road	local	Q	August 23, 1907	Formerly known as Avenue C station
Flatbush		Newkirk Plaza	all	B Q	August 23, 1907	Originally known as Parkville station
Midwood	Disabled access	Avenue H	local	Q	August 23, 1907	
Midwood		Avenue J	local	Q	August 23, 1907	
Midwood		Avenue M	local	Q	August 23, 1907	Originally known as South Greenfield station, and later Elm Avenue station
Midwood	Disabled access	Kings Highway	all	B Q	August 23, 1907	B82 Select Bus Service; Originally described as at Kings Highway, near the Prospect Park Fair Grounds
Homecrest		Avenue U	local	Q	August 23, 1907	Originally known as Gravesend station
Homecrest		Neck Road	local	Q	August 23, 1907	Former transfer to LIRR
Sheepshead Bay	Disabled access	Sheepshead Bay	all	B Q	August 23, 1907	Originally described as at Coney Island Creek, Sheepshead Bay.
Brighton Beach		Brighton Beach	all	B Q	August 23, 1907	Originally serviced the Brighton Beach Hotel at this location.
Brighton Beach	Express tracks continue (no regular service)					
Brighton Beach		Ocean Parkway	all	Q	April 22, 1917	
Local tracks merge into express tracks (Local trackways continue to lower level of West Eighth Street)
Coney Island		West Eighth Street–New York Aquarium	all	Q	May 19, 1919	F <F> (IND Culver Line); Brighton tracks on upper level
Coney Island	Disabled access	Coney Island–Stillwell Avenue	all	Q	May 29, 1919	D (BMT West End Line); F <F> (IND Culver Line); N (BMT Sea Beach Line)

== See also ==
- Transportation to Coney Island
