= Jerry Tokofsky =

American film executive (1934–2025)

- Born: April 14, 1934; New York City, U.S.
- Died: October 5, 2025 (aged 91); New York City, U.S.
- Occupations: Agent, film producer, studio executive
- Notable work: Where's Poppa? Glengarry Glen Ross

Jerry Herbert Tokofsky (April 14, 1934 – October 5, 2025) was an American agent, film producer and studio executive.

== Early life ==
Tokofsky was born in Brooklyn, New York City on April 14, 1934, the son of Julius H. Tokofsky and his wife Rose Trager.

== Career ==
Tokofsky began his connection with the film business as an agent, and by the 1960s had become a studio executive at Columbia Pictures. In 1966, he was a vice-president of Columbia. He then produced films for the studio.

Harrison Ford had an early onscreen role as a bellhop in Dead Heat on a Merry-Go-Round (1966), on which Tokofsky worked. In 1967, Mike Frankovich assigned the review of Ford's contract with Columbia to Tokofsky, and he terminated it, telling Ford that when Tony Curtis delivered a bag of groceries, he did it like a movie star. He added, "You ain’t got it, kid!" Ford later revealed in 2023 that Tokofsky had asked him to change his name, saying Harrison Ford was "too pretentious a name for a young man".

By 1968, Tokofsky had become head of Columbia's creative affairs department, which had the tasks of evaluating scripts and overseeing actors, directors, and producers. He took on Peter Guber as his assistant and later spoke warmly of Guber's usefulness to him.

By the early 1970s, Tokofsky was producing films for United Artists and others. Born to Win (1971) was the first film by a production company founded by Tokofsky and George Segal.

In the 1980s, Tokofsky was working in the 20th Century Fox television department. One evening, Harrison Ford was dining in the Warner Brothers Commissary, and a waiter brought him a salver with Tokofsky's card on it, on which was written "I missed my bet"; Ford turned around to see where Tokofsky was, and found with some pleasure that he could no longer recognize him.

In 1986, at the suggestion of Irvin Kershner, Tokofsky and Stanley Zupnik paid David Mamet one million dollars for the film rights to his award-winning play Glengarry Glen Ross, but it took them several years to raise the money to make the film, as no major studio would touch it.

== Personal life and death ==
On February 21, 1956, Tokofsky married Myrna Weinstein, and before divorcing they had two sons; in 1970, he married secondly Fiammetta Bettuzzi, and they had a daughter, but this also ended in divorce; thirdly, on October 4, 1981, he married Karen Oliver.

Tokofsky died in New York City on October 5, 2025, at the age of 91.

== Films ==
- Producer, Dead Heat on a Merry-Go-Round (1966)
- Producer (with Marvin Worth), Where's Poppa? (United Artists, 1970)
- Executive producer, Born to Win (UA, 1971)
- Producer and writer, The Second Time Around (TV pilot, ABC, 1979)
- Executive producer, Paternity (Paramount, 1981)
- Co-producer (with Bruce Cohn Curtis), Dreamscape (Twentieth Century-Fox, 1984)
- Co-producer (with Bruce Cohn Curtis), Fear City (Chevy Chase, 1984)
- Producer (with Hunt Lowry), Wildfire (Zupnik Cinema Group, 1988)
- Producer, Glengarry Glen Ross (New Line Cinema, 1992)
- Producer, The Grass Harp (1995)
