= Manu Narayan =

American actor

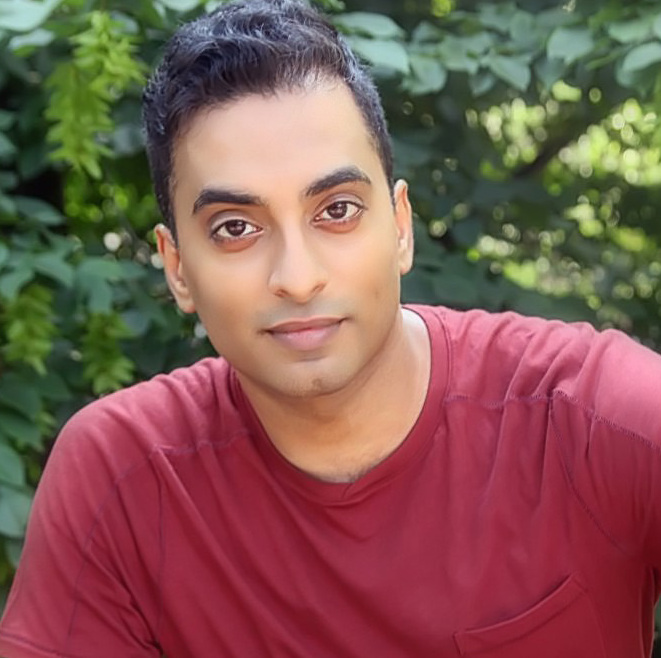
- Manu Narayan in 2013
- Born: August 16, 1973 (age 53); Pittsburgh, Pennsylvania, United States
- Occupations: Actor, film producer, singer, songwriter, composer, saxophonist
- Years active: 1999–present

Manu Narayan (born August 16, 1973) is an American actor, film producer, singer, songwriter, composer and saxophonist.

Narayan was hailed as a "promising young star...a compelling actor and outstanding singer who can light up a stage with sheer force of personality" by UPI in 2004 when he made his Broadway debut in the Andrew Lloyd Webber and A.R. Rahman musical Bombay Dreams, originating the role of the "hero" Akaash. Narayan co-starred as Rajneesh alongside Mike Myers in the Paramount Pictures' feature film The Love Guru (2008). He currently guest stars as Hari Sahni on the Apple TV series Your Friends & Neighbors starring Jon Hamm.

== Early life ==
Narayan was born in Pittsburgh, Pennsylvania.

He is an accomplished classical saxophonist in the western and South Indian Carnatic styles. When Narayan was a freshman at Carnegie Mellon University in Pittsburgh, he won the Concerto Competition and performed the Glazunov Saxophone Concerto with orchestra at Carnegie Hall in Pittsburgh. Narayan studied the Carnatic saxophone in Mangalore, India with Sri Kadri Gopalnath, and played on All India Radio as the winner of the All India Radio music competition of Mangalore. He served as a Trustee of Carnegie Mellon University, his alma mater, from 2013-2016.

== Career ==
=== Acting ===
On stage, Narayan made his Broadway debut in the Andrew Lloyd Webber/A.R. Rahman musical Bombay Dreams in 2004, originating the role he is most widely known for, the "hero" Akaash, and garnered a New York Drama League nomination. Narayan co-starred as Zoltan Karpathy in the original cast of Bartlett Sher's 2018 revival of My Fair Lady at Lincoln Center Theater. That same year, he appeared as Robbie Patel in the original Broadway cast of Gettin' the Band Back Together at the Belasco Theater. Narayan created the role of Charlie Kringas in the 2019 Roundabout Theater / Fiasco off Broadway revival of Stephen Sondheim's Merrily We Roll Along and the role of Uncle Ernie in the Kennedy Center revival of The Who's Tommy. In 2021, he played Theo in Company on Broadway at the Bernard B. Jacobs Theatre, replacing Kyle Dean Massey, who left after the closure of theaters due to the COVID-19 pandemic.

Narayan appeared as Richard Roma in La Jolla Playhouse's critically acclaimed revival of Glengarry Glen Ross, receiving critical praise for his performance as well as a nomination for a 2012 San Diego Critics Circle Craig Noel Award.

Narayan starred as the romantic lead in Sudhish Kamath's Good Night Good Morning, which he co-produced, and Shailja Gupta's Walkaway. He co-starred with Lucy Hale in A Cinderella Story: Once Upon a Song and was featured in M. Night Shyamalan's The Last Airbender. He also co-starred with Canadian comic Russell Peters in Quarter Life Crisis which was first broadcast on Showtime.

=== Music ===
In 2003, Narayan was invited to sing at a small state dinner for the first official visit of President George W. Bush to the UK. Narayan sang for and met Queen Elizabeth II, the Royal Family, and President George W. Bush and Colin Powell. He also sang for then Senator John Kerry's presidential campaign, sponsored by Senator Hillary Clinton, as well as elsewhere with Cyndi Lauper, The Band's Garth Hudson and Martha Wainwright.

As a recording artist, Narayan has collaborated on and recorded original and cover tracks for feature film soundtracks including The Love Guru, A Cinderella Story: Once Upon a Song, Good Night Good Morning and Walkaway. He co-wrote and recorded the single "Help Me to Find" for the film Hiding Divya starring Madhur Jaffrey. Narayan has collaborated with Grammy winner Frank London numerous times around the world, most recently recording and performing for his Soundbrush Records' klezmer concept album, A Night in the Old Marketplace. As the lead vocalist, Narayan performed the concert version of the album throughout Europe and North America. He worked on a new klezmer/Desi collaboration called SHARABI with London and master percussionist Deep Singh, whom he performed with in Bombay Dreams. SHARABI performed at the 2014 Jewish Culture Festival in Kraków, Poland.

Narayan is also lead singer of the band D A R U N A M with Radovan Jovicevic, founding member of Yugoslavia's Grupa Zana. The band brings together the melodies and rhythms from three countries: America, India and Serbia. He recorded with D A R U N A M bandmate Radovan Jovicevic the single "Have Me" for the 2007 film And Then Came Love starring Vanessa Williams. Narayan and Jovicevic have released the 2007 EP All That's Beautiful Must Die and the title track's video featuring Janina Gavankar. Their album of Electronic Lounge/World Gypsy music with Canadian clarinetist Milan Milosevic entitled The Last Angel on Earth was released live on CBC national radio in Canada in 2010. D A R U N A M collaborated on an original theatre piece with playwright Aditi Kapil. Their untitled piece was selected to the Berkeley Repertory Theatre's 2014 Ground Floor Writer's Summer Residency Lab.

== Filmography ==
=== Film ===
Year	Title	Role	Notes
2006	Quarter Life Crisis	Jonathan	
2006	Hiding Divya	Irfana Auntie's son	
2006	Two Men in Shoulder Stand		Short
2008	The Love Guru	Rajneesh	
2008	Radha	Brother	Short
2009	The Order		Short
2009	Three	Brother	
2009	Clap Clap	Jay	Short
2010	Wall Street: Money Never Sleeps	Quant Analyst	
2010	The Last Airbender	Fire Nation Head Prison Guard	
2010	Good Night Good Morning	Turya	Also songwriter / soundtrack artist
2010	Walkaway	Darius	Also songwriter / soundtrack artist
2011	A Cinderella Story: Once Upon a Song	Ravi / Tony Gupta	Video
2014	99 Homes	Khanna	
2019	The Assistant	Amir (voice)	
2022	Anything's Possible	Sasan	
2025	If I Had Legs I'd Kick You	Landlord	

=== Television ===
Year	Title	Role	Notes
2001	Law & Order: Special Victims Unit	Henry	Episode: "Parasite"
2004	The Sopranos	Sukhjit Khan	Episode: "All Happy Families..."
2007	M.O.N.Y.	Sunil Ramesh	TV movie
2008	Lipstick Jungle	Development Person #2	Episode: "Pilot"
2008	Mayor of N.Y.		Pilot
2008	Click and Clack's As the Wrench Turns	Hans / Yagdesh (voice)	2 episodes
2010	Nurse Jackie	Paramedic	Episode: "Comfort Food"
2010	Rubicon	Bob Standard	Episode: "Caught in the Suck"
2011	Unforgettable	Sami	Episode: "Heroes"
2011	The Protector		Pilot
2013	Deception	Plastic Surgeon	Episode: "Pilot"
2014	The Following	FBI Analyst Reece	Episode: "Resurrection"
2014	The Bold and the Beautiful	Abu Dhabi Doctor	Episode #1.6849
2014	Grey's Anatomy	Eric Choudry	Episode: "Puzzle with a Piece Missing"
2019	The Blacklist	Arjun	Episode: "The Hawaladar (No. 162)"
2019	Bull	George	Episode: "Imminent Danger"
2020	Emergence	Justin	Episode: "Killshot Pt. 1"
2021	Prodigal Son	Dr. Fred Chabra	Episode: "Face Value"
2021	And Just Like That...	Dr. Vikash Patel	Episode: "Tragically Hip"
2023	Scott Pilgrim Takes Off	Singer (voice)	2 episodes
2025–2026	Your Friends & Neighbors	Hari Sahni	Recurring

== Theater ==
Year	Title	Role	Notes
1992	Fame	Goodman "Goody" King	Pittsburgh CLO, Pittsburgh, Pennsylvania
1993	Mame	Ito	Theater of the Stars, Atlanta, Georgia
1994	Godspell	"We Beseech Thee"	The Muny, St. Louis, Missouri
1996–1998	Miss Saigon	Barman / Vietnamese Soldier	Second National Tour
1999	Love's Labour's Lost	Dull	Shakespeare and Company, Lenox, Massachusetts
2000	Romeo and Juliet	Romeo	Shakespeare and Company, Lenox, Massachusetts
2001	Largo		Powerhouse Theater, Poughkeepsie, New York
2002	The Winter's Tale	Florizel	Missouri Repertory Theatre, Kansas City, Missouri
2002	Indian Ink	Nirad Das	The Wilma Theater, Philadelphia, Pennsylvania
2003	Fucking A	Second Hunter	The Joseph Papp Public Theater, New York City, New York
2003	Metamorphoses	Orpheus and others	The Repertory Theater of St. Louis, St. Louis, Missouri
2004	Bombay Dreams	Akaash	Broadway Theatre, New York City, New York
2006	The People Next Door	Nigel	Yale Repertory Theatre, New Haven, Connecticut
2006	SIDD: the musical	Sidd	New World Stages, New York City, New York
2006	subUrbia	Norman	Second Stage Theater, New York City, New York
2006	The Boys from Syracuse	Antipholus of Syracuse	CenterStage, Baltimore, Maryland
2007	Falsettoland	Whizzer	NAATCO, New York City, New York
2007	Les Misérables	Enjolras	The Muny, St. Louis, Missouri
2009	Cyrano	Cyrano de Bergerac	CenterStage, Baltimore, Maryland
2010	The Lisbon Traviata	Mike	The Kennedy Center, Washington DC
2011	Yeast Nation	Jan the Wise	New York International Fringe Festival, New York City, New York
2011	The Rivals	Captain Jack Absolute	CenterStage, Baltimore, Maryland
2012	Two Gentlemen of Verona	Eglamour	Shakespeare Theatre Company, Washington D.C.
2012	Glengarry Glen Ross	Richard Roma	La Jolla Playhouse, La Jolla, California
2013	Gettin' the Band Back Together	Rummesh "Robbie" Patel	George Street Playhouse, New Brunswick, New Jersey
2014	Thumbprint - a Chamber Opera	Faiz Muhammed	Prototype Festival, New York City, New York
2015	Our Town	Stage Manager	Bratton Theatre, Chautauqua, New York
2016	Guards at the Taj	Humayun	La Jolla Playhouse, La Jolla, California
2017	Romeo and Juliet	Friar Laurence	Bratton Theatre, Chautauqua, New York
2018	My Fair Lady	Professor Zoltan Karpathy	Vivian Beaumont Theater, New York City, New York
2018	Gettin' the Band Back Together	Rummesh "Robbie" Patel	Belasco Theatre, New York City, New York
2019	Merrily We Roll Along	Charley Kringas	Roundabout Theater Company, New York City, New York
2019	The Who's Tommy	Uncle Ernie	The Kennedy Center, Washington, D.C.
2020	Bliss	The King	5th Avenue Theatre, Seattle, Washington
2021	Company	Theo	Bernard B. Jacobs Theatre, New York City, New York
2022	A Delicate Balance	Tobias	Connelly Theater, New York City, New York
2023	Into the Woods	The Baker	Benedum Theatre, Pittsburgh, Pennsylvania
2025	The Baker's Wife	Barnaby	Classic Stage Company, New York, City, New York
