= Sheepshead Bay station =

New York City Subway station in Brooklyn

Sheepshead Bay
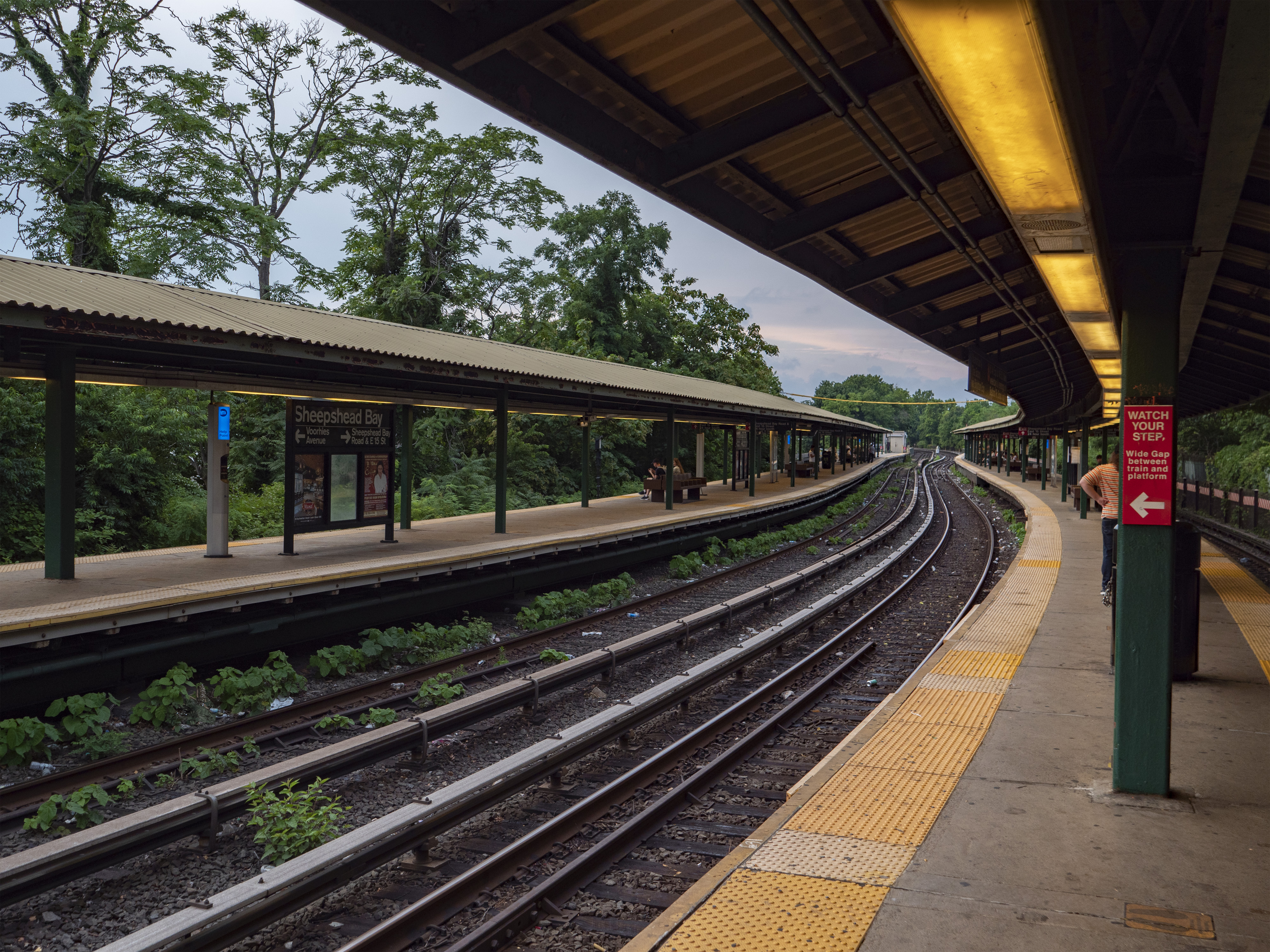

Station statistics
- Address: Sheepshead Bay Road & East 16th Street; Brooklyn, New York
- Borough: Brooklyn
- Locale: Sheepshead Bay
- Coordinates: 40.587168°N 73.953266°W
- Division: B (BMT)
- Line: BMT Brighton Line
- Services: B (weekday rush hours, middays and early evenings); Q (all times)
- Transit: NYCT Bus: B4, B36, B49
- Structure: Embankment
- Platforms: 2 island platforms cross-platform interchange
- Tracks: 4

Other information
- Opened: July 2, 1878; 148 years ago (BF&CI); August 23, 1907; 119 years ago (BRT)
- Accessible: Yes

Traffic
- 2025: 2,776,796 ▼1.2%
- Rank: 138 out of 423
Services
Preceding station	New York City Subway	Following station
Kings Highway B toward 145th Street	Express	Brighton Beach B Q southbound
Neck Road Q toward 96th Street	Local	Brighton Beach B Q southbound
Former services
Preceding station	Long Island Rail Road	Following station
Neck Road toward Manhattan Beach Junction	Manhattan Beach Branch	Manhattan Beach Terminus
Location
Location within New York City Subway
Location within New York City
Location within New York
Track layout
Street map
Station service legend
Symbol	Description
Stops all times	Stops all times
Stops weekdays during the day	Stops weekdays during the day

The Sheepshead Bay station is an express station on the BMT Brighton Line of the New York City Subway. It is located in the Sheepshead Bay neighborhood of Brooklyn. It is served by the Q train at all times and by the B train on weekdays.

== History ==
On August 1, 1920, a tunnel under Flatbush Avenue opened, connecting the Brighton Line to the Broadway subway in Manhattan. At the same time, the line's former track connections to the Fulton Street Elevated were severed. Subway trains from Manhattan and elevated trains from Franklin Avenue served Brighton Line stations, sharing the line to Coney Island.

In April 1931, as part of a project to extend the station platforms, a new entrance opened at Voorhies Avenue.

It was renovated by New York City Transit’s in-house maintenance-of-way forces in 1997-1998.

In December 2008, a wooden pedestrian bridge was built above the express tracks that connected the two platforms near the north end of this station. This was for passengers wishing to transfer between directions during reconstruction of Avenue U and Neck Road. The bridge was removed in September 2010.

In 2019, as part of an initiative to increase the accessibility of the New York City Subway system, the MTA announced that it would install elevators at the Sheepshead Bay station as part of the MTA's 2020–2024 Capital Program. In November 2022, the MTA announced that it would award a $965 million contract for the installation of 21 elevators across eight stations, including Sheepshead Bay. A joint venture of ASTM and Halmar International would construct the elevators under a public-private partnership. Construction of the elevators began in August 2023. The elevators opened in February 2026.

== Station layout ==
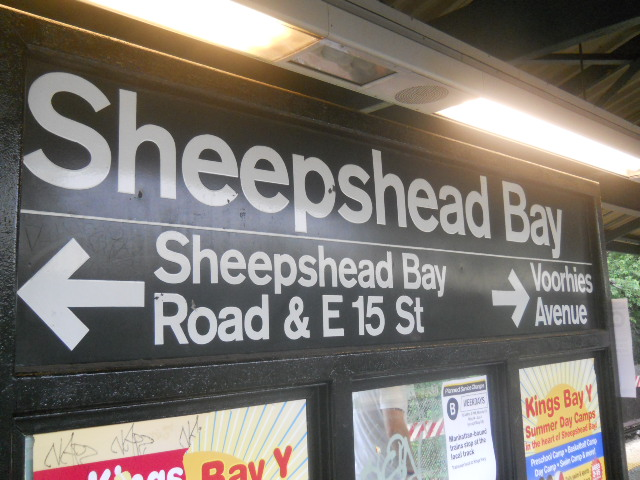
Station signage

This express station is located on an embankment, and has four tracks with two island platforms. The Q stops here at all times and is local, while the B stops here only on weekdays during the day and is express. The next stop to the north is Neck Road for local trains and Kings Highway for express trains, while the next stop to the south is Brighton Beach for all service.

The platforms curve to the west at the south end and were extended to the north on both sides. There is clear evidence of this extension by looking underneath the platforms. This station originally was a terminal stop as the extension to Brighton Beach was not built until 1917. Outside and to the east of the Voorhies Avenue side entrance, there is a pedestrian overpass running alongside the Manhattan-bound side of line, but it only crosses the Belt Parkway to the south side.

The 1998 artwork here is called Postcards from Sheepshead Bay by Deborah Goletz. Made of ceramic tile, it draws the faces and life on the "Bay" (a local shortening of Sheepshead Bay). The three artwork designs are a diner, some people wearing 17th century clothing near a boat dock, and a fisherman. A closer examination of the tile band at the mezzanine level has seashells and Pisces fish. Outside the station is a mural in the style of a "Welcome to Sheepshead Bay" postcard. As a homage to similar boardwalk attractions, this mural features holes for people inside to stick their faces through, and have their picture taken from outside.

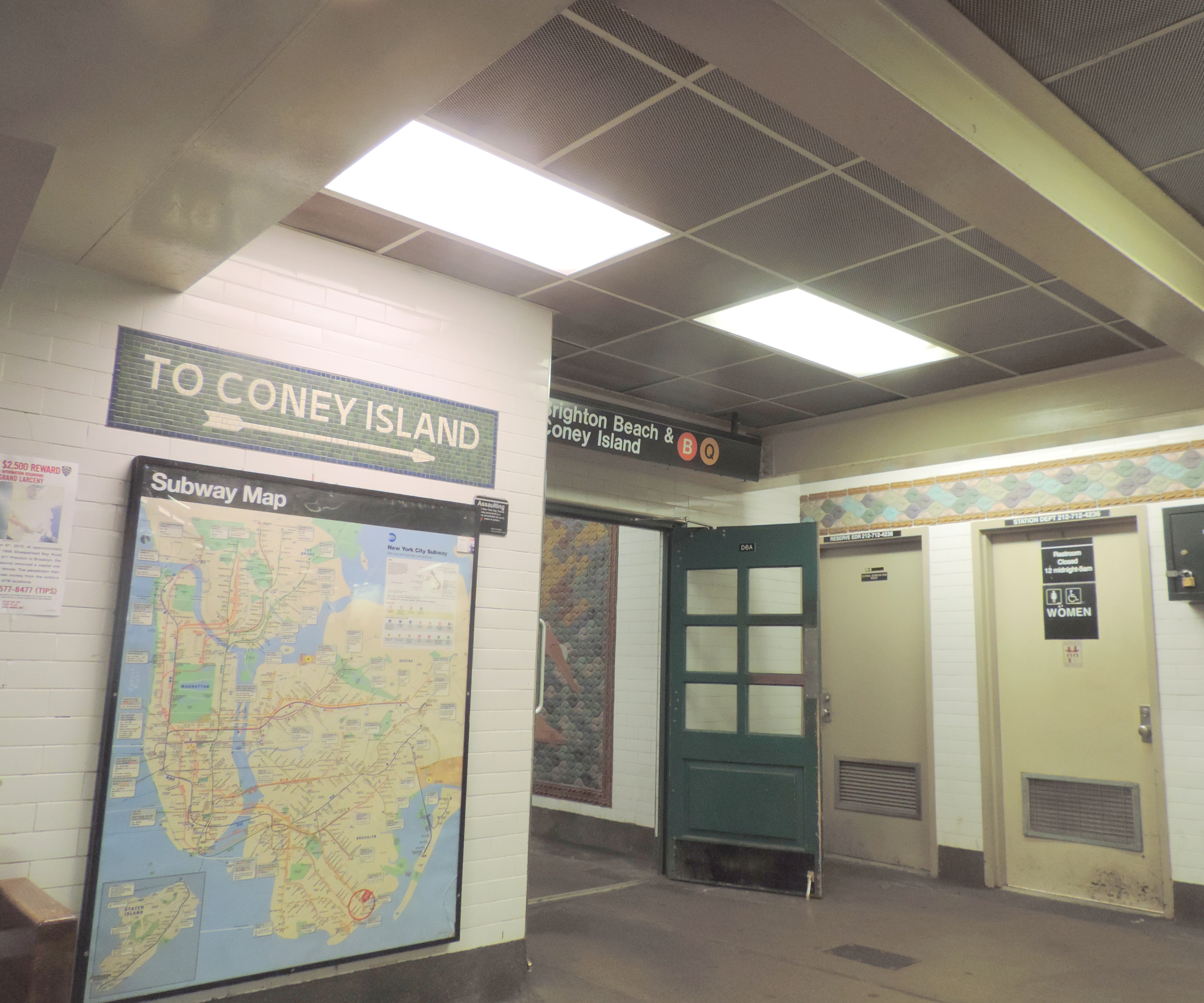
To Coney Island stair, mosaic

=== Exits ===
In addition to the aforementioned interactive mural, the full-time entrance at Sheepshead Bay Road and East 16th Street also has a bench facing fare control and two overhead heaters. This side has two stairs to each platform. There was a small arcade of stores starting on the side opposite of the station agent booth prior to the station's renovation, but it was rearranged and broken up into several stores.

The part-time entrance to Voorhies Avenue is at the very south end of the platforms and each has one staircase to the mezzanine. This side had a booth until 2010 that was open only during weekday mornings. It now has a regular bank of turnstiles that is only open weekdays and is HEET access other times.

Both mezzanines have BMT-style directional mosaics tablets that says "To Manhattan" and "To Coney Island."

== Gallery ==
South entrance, as seen from the street

South entrance, past fare equipment

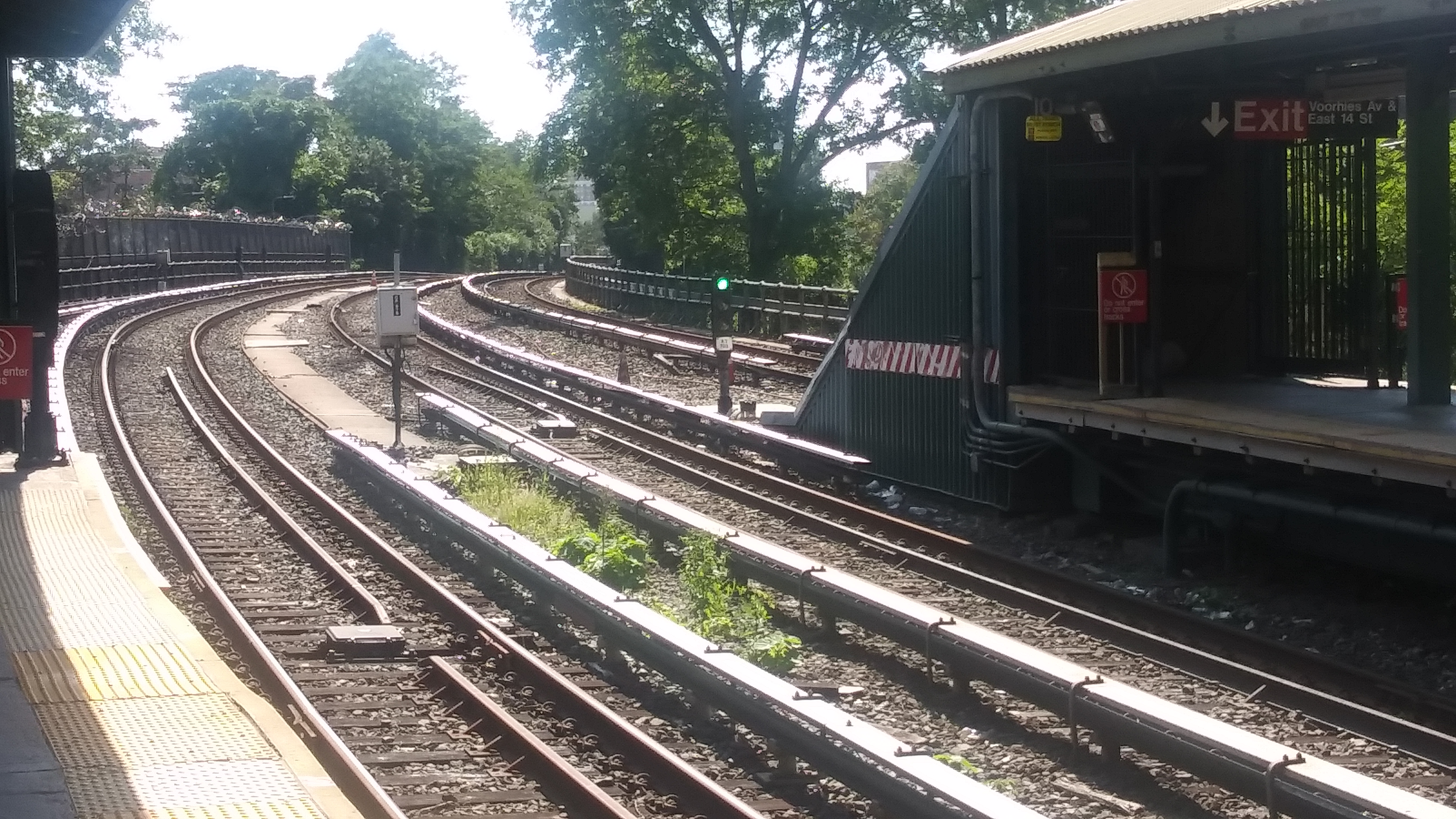
Station platform, looking southward

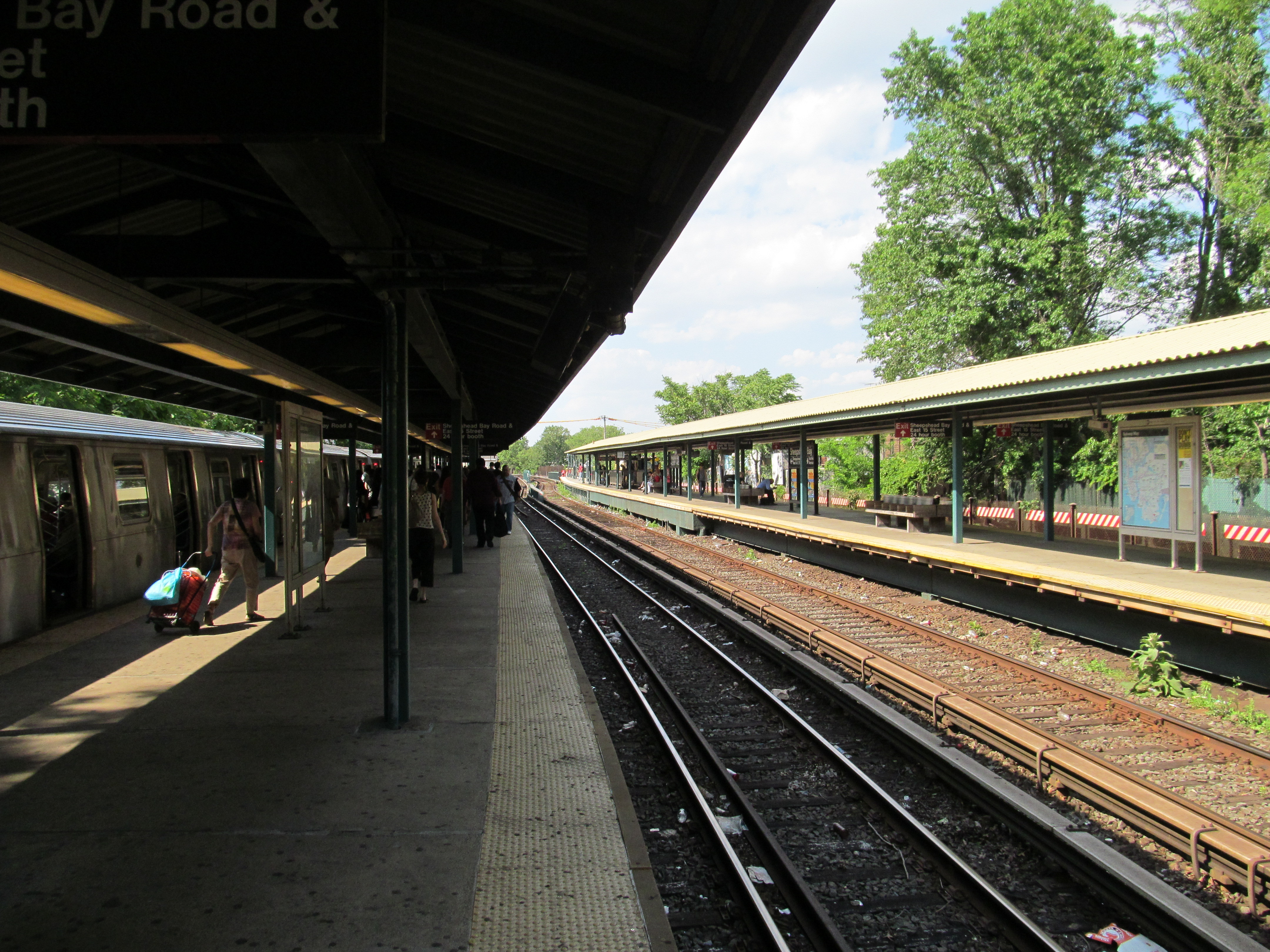
Station platforms for local and express trains

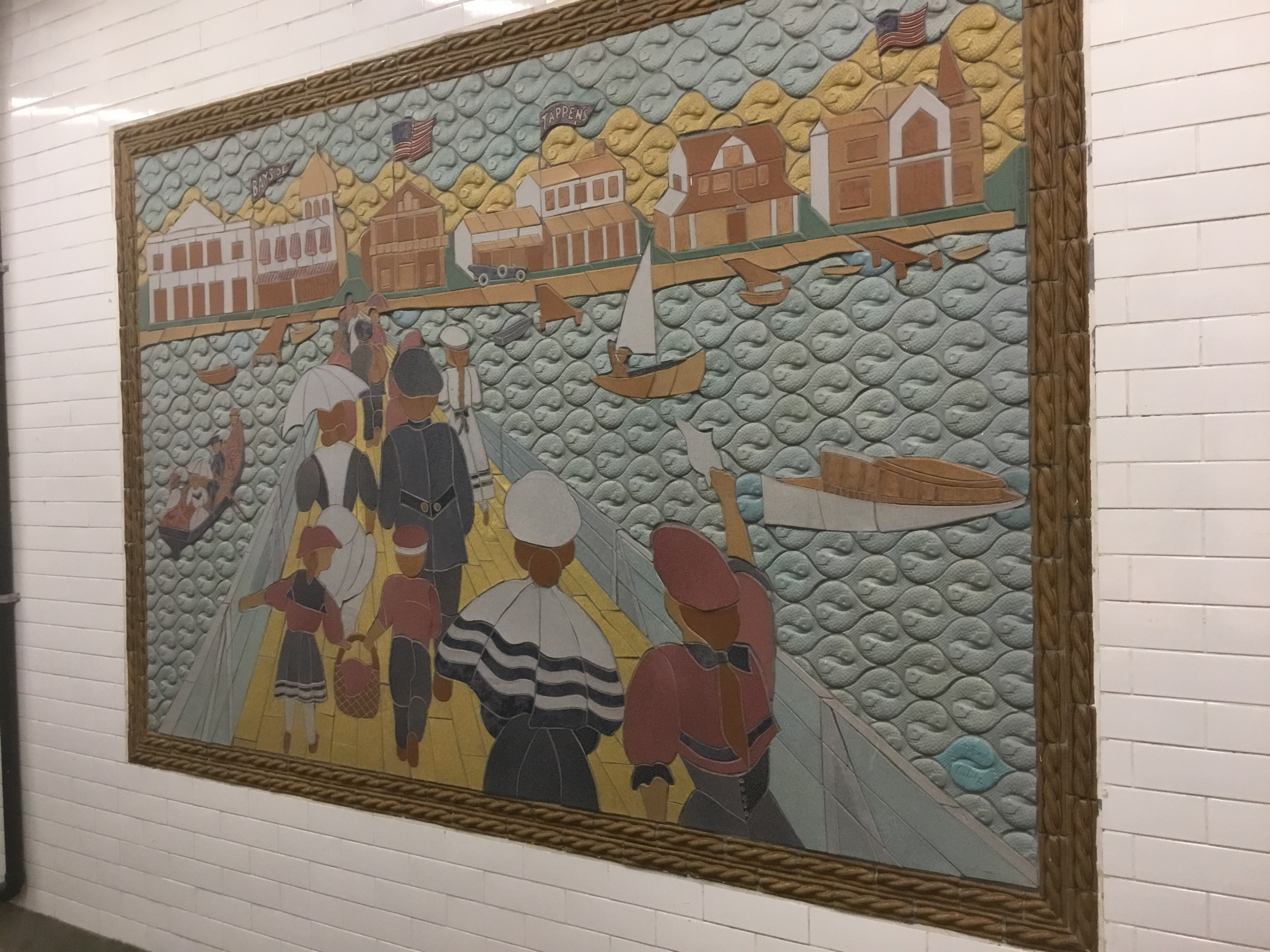
Station mosaic "Postcards from Sheepshead Bay"

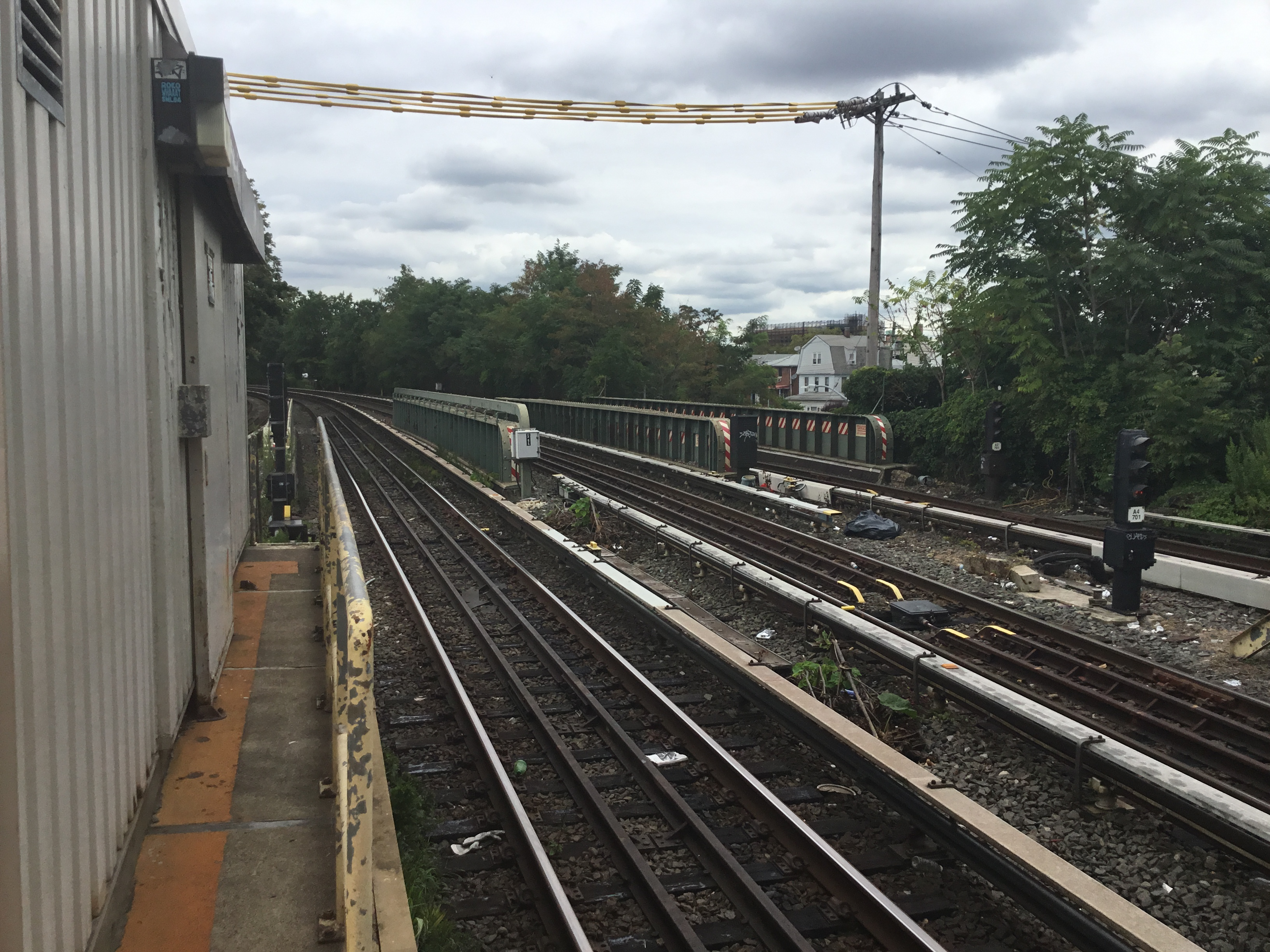
Looking northward

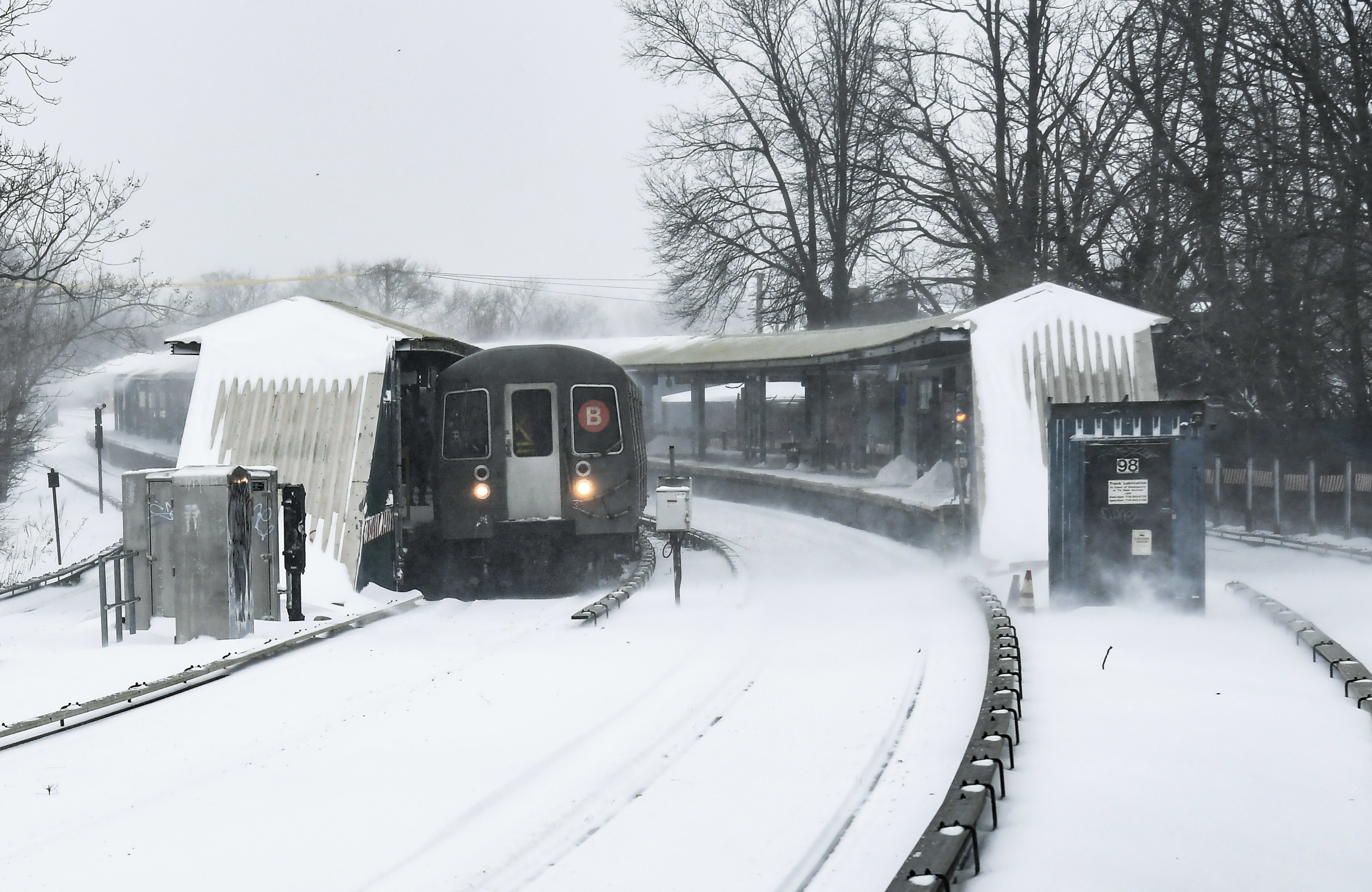
South end of the station, during winter storms

== In popular culture ==
The station was featured in the film version of Glengarry Glen Ross.
