= Good Night Good Morning =

Good Night, Good Morning
- Promotional Poster
- Directed by: Sudhish Kamath
- Written by: Sudhish Kamath; Shilpa Rathnam
- Produced by: Sudhish Kamath
- Starring: Seema Rahmani; Manu Narayan; Vasanth Santhosham
- Cinematography: Nischalakrishna Vittalanathan, Naveen Varadarajan (Additional cinematography)
- Edited by: Murugesh Thevar; M Venkatram; Vijay Venkataramanan
- Release dates: October 2010 (Mumbai Film Festival); 20 January 2012 (India)
- Running time: 81 minutes
- Country: India
- Language: English

Good Night, Good Morning is an Indian independent romance film co-written, directed and produced by Sudhish Kamath. The film starring Seema Rahmani, Manu Narayan and Vasanth Santosham, illustrates the "old-world romance that still exists in the modern, technology driven world". Following screenings at several international film festivals, the film saw a theatrical release in India on 20 January 2012.

== Cast ==
- Manu Narayan as Turiya
- Seema Rahmani as Moira
- Vasanth Santosham as Hussain
- Raja Sen as J. C.
- Naren Weiss as Musician

== Release ==
Good Night, Good Morning was screened at the Mumbai Film Festival (MAMI) 2010, South Asian International Film Festival 2010, Goa Film Alliance-IFFI 2010, Chennai International Film Festival 2010, Habitat Film Festival 2011 and Transilvania International Film Festival 2011 (Cluj, Romania) and Noordelijk Film Festival 2011 (Netherlands). The film was selected for exclusive release through PVR's new banner called Director's Rare.

== Reception ==
The film opened to mostly positive reviews. At the Transilvania International Film Festival, Cluj, Romania in June 2011, 86 voters from the audience rated the film 3.97 on 5. Also the film scored a 7.11 on 10 through audience votes at the Noordelijk Film Festival. A critic from Bollyspice.com wrote in her review: "To call Good Night | Good Morning good cinema is understatement; it’s beyond good… It’s original, engrossing and entertaining". "Special mention to Sudhish Kamath’s ‘Good Night | Good Morning’ which is in the ‘Before Sunrise’ space. The script by Kamath and Shilpa Rathnam is mint fresh with some great dialogues," Harneet Singh from Indian Express wrote in her review of the Mumbai Film Festival. Namrata Joshi mentioned Good Night|Good Morning as one of the "standout Indian efforts" in her review of the Mumbai Film Festival, 2011. In a more detailed review in January 2012, she rated it 3 out of 4, citing that it can "reach out to the young, urban, upwardly mobile, but lonely, disconnected souls living anywhere in the world, not just India".

J. Hurtado of Twitch Film noted that the film was "among the most charming and creative Indian independent films". Allen O'Brien of Times of India gave the film 4 ouf of 5. Geeta Padmanabhan of The Hindu wrote: "Here is a movie that gently, amusingly persuades us into seeing the kind of pass our lives have come to. This is who we are, what we do. This is us, our love, our loss". Aseem Chhabra of Ahmedabad Mirror wrote: "There is true independent spirit behind the making of GNGM and for that reason alone it should be supported by fans of good cinema", further adding that the film was "gifted with clever writing and strong, charming performances. One rarely finds this much honesty in Indian films". Sify.com claimed that it was "much like the waffles it mentions—sweet, light, and to be savored immediately". Shakti Salgaokar of Daily News and Analysis gave four stars and wrote: "Good Night Good Morning is a compelling watch. The film engages you emotionally and as the credits roll, it leaves you with a big smile on your face [...] One has to experience this film. Go watch it. Not just because it is a great film, but because it is an outstanding experience that doesn't come by too often out of Indian cinema!" Director Karan Johar rated the film 3.5 out of 5, citing: "Good Morning, Good Night delivers on most accounts what it promises to be -- a cerebral joyride. A critic from CNN-IBN described Good Night Good Morning as a "brilliant film that should be supported for the sake of good cinema".
