= Glengarry Glen Ross (film) =

1992 American drama by James Foley

- Theatrical release poster
- Directed by: James Foley
- Screenplay by: David Mamet
- Based on: Glengarry Glen Ross by David Mamet
- Produced by: Jerry Tokofsky; Stanley R. Zupnik
- Starring: Al Pacino; Jack Lemmon; Alec Baldwin; Ed Harris; Alan Arkin; Kevin Spacey; Jonathan Pryce
- Cinematography: Juan Ruiz Anchía
- Edited by: Howard Smith
- Music by: James Newton Howard
- Production company: Zupnik Enterprises
- Distributed by: New Line Cinema
- Release date: October 2, 1992
- Running time: 100 minutes
- Country: United States
- Language: English
- Budget: $12.5 million
- Box office: $10.7 million (North America)

Glengarry Glen Ross is a 1992 American drama film directed by James Foley and written by David Mamet, based on his 1983 play. The film depicts two days in the lives of four real-estate salesmen and their increasing desperation when the corporate office sends a motivational trainer with the threat that all but the top two salesmen will be fired within one week.

Like the play, the film is notorious for its use of profanity, leading the cast to refer to the film jokingly as Death of a Fuckin' Salesman. The title of the film is derived from the names of two of the fictitious real-estate developments being peddled by the salesmen: Glengarry Highlands and Glen Ross Farms.

The film was critically acclaimed. The world premiere was held at the 49th Venice Film Festival, where Jack Lemmon was awarded the Volpi Cup for Best Actor. Al Pacino was nominated for an Academy Award and a Golden Globe Award for Best Supporting Actor. However, the film was a box-office failure for grossing $10.7 million in North America against a $12.5 million budget.

== Plot ==
Four real-estate salesmen (Richard Roma, George Aaronow, Shelley "The Machine" Levene, and Dave Moss) are supplied with leads—the names and phone numbers of prospective investors—and use deceitful and dubious sales tactics. Many of the leads rationed by office manager John Williamson lack either the money or the desire to actually invest in land. The firm sends Blake, one of its top salesmen, to motivate the team. In a torrent of verbal abuse, he gives them notice of termination and tells them that only the top two deal-closers of the month, with one week to go, will keep their jobs and gain access to promising leads for the new and lucrative Glengarry Highlands development.

Levene is a once-successful salesman in a long-running slump and with a daughter in the hospital. Levene tries to persuade Williamson to give him some of the Glengarry leads. Williamson is willing to sell some of the prime leads, but demands cash in advance, which Levene does not have.

Moss and Aaronow complain about the firm's management, and Moss proposes that they steal the Glengarry leads and sell them to a competing agency. Aaronow wants no part of the plan, but Moss tries to coerce him, saying that Aaronow is already an accessory before the fact because he knows about the proposed burglary.

Roma is the office's top closer by far. At the nearby bar, he strikes up a conversation with meek, middle-aged James Lingk. The lengthy, friendly conversation with no sales pitch is one of Roma's methods of sizing up a prospective sucker for vulnerabilities. Roma plays on Lingk's feelings of insecurity by casually producing a brochure for the latest worthless properties, without a hard sell, rather framing the deal as an opportunity rather than a purchase.

When the salesmen arrive at the office the next morning, they're greeted by police and learn that the office was burglarized: all the phones, some client contracts, and the Glengarry leads were stolen. Williamson assures Roma that his contract with Lingk was not stolen, and he and the police question each of the salesmen in private. After his interrogation, Moss has a shouting match with Roma and leaves.

Roma sees Lingk arrive and quickly gets Levene to pretend that he is an American Express executive. Lingk came to demand the return of his down payment under the three-day cooling-off period because his wife objected to the deal. Roma tries to stall and confuse Lingk, first with lies about the number of business days and going out of town, but he is interrupted by the police detective, who wants to question Roma. Roma further lies to Lingk, saying that the check has not yet been deposited anyway, and that there is time to cancel the payment when he returns on Monday. Williamson comes out of his office, and hearing Lingk's name but unaware of Roma's tactic, unwittingly contradicts Roma with assurance that the check was deposited and the signed contract was filed with the central office. Lingk rushes out of the office upset. Roma berates Williamson for ruining his sale, unaware that Williamson was also lying, because it's revealed later that the check was in fact not deposited.

Levene, proud of a big sale that he made that morning, also berates Williamson for "making something up" without knowing the situation. Williamson realizes that Levene could only have known he lied about the check being cashed if he broke into the office and saw the check on his desk. Williamson's practice is always to take the checks immediately to the bank at the end of the night, except that the night before he had gone home early to spend time with his children. He threatens to inform the police if Levene does not return the leads. Levene admits that he joined Moss in the latter's burglary plan, getting a cut of the money after Moss sold the leads to a competitor. Levene attempts to bribe Williamson with a share of his sales to keep quiet, but Williamson scoffs that Levene has no sales. He already knew that Levene's latest buyers are a delusional couple who have no money. Levene realizes that Williamson gave him the worthless lead to set him up to fail, and asks why. Williamson replies, "Because I don't like you." Levene pleads for the sake of his ill daughter, but Williamson rebuffs him and goes into his office to inform the detective.

Roma emerges from questioning. Unaware of the exchange, he compliments Levene on his sale and suggests that they form their own partnership. As Levene gets up to meet with the detective, he looks back wistfully at Roma, who has already returned to his sales work. Aaronow picks up the phone and calls a lead.

== Cast ==
- Al Pacino as Richard Roma, the office's top closer
- Jack Lemmon as Shelley "The Machine" Levene
- Alec Baldwin as Blake, a top salesman, sent to motivate the room
- Alan Arkin as George Aaronow, office salesman
- Ed Harris as Dave Moss, office salesman
- Kevin Spacey as John Williamson, the office manager
- Jonathan Pryce as James Lingk, Roma's customer
- Bruce Altman as Larry Spannel, a prospective customer of Shelley
- Jude Ciccolella as Detective Baylen

== Production ==
David Mamet's play was first performed in 1983 at the National Theatre in London. It won the Pulitzer Prize for Drama at the 1984 Pulitzer Prize ceremony. That year, the play made its American debut in Chicago before moving to Broadway. Producer Jerry Tokofsky read the play on a trip to New York City in 1985 at the suggestion of director Irvin Kershner, who wanted to make it into a film. Tokofsky saw the play on Broadway and contacted Mamet. Stanley R. Zupnik was a Washington, D.C.–based producer of B movies who was looking for a more profitable project. Tokofsky had co-produced Fear City and Dreamscape, two previous Zupnik films. In 1986, Tokofsky told Zupnik about Mamet's play, and Zupnik saw it on Broadway but found the plot confusing.

Mamet wanted $500,000 for the film rights and another $500,000 to write the screenplay. Zupnik agreed to pay Mamet's $1 million asking price, figuring that they could make a deal with a cable company to bankroll the production. Because of the uncompromising subject matter and abrasive language, no major studio wanted to finance it, even with film stars attached. Financing came from cable and video companies, a German television station, an Australian cinema chain, several banks, and New Line Cinema across four years.

Al Pacino originally wanted to do the play on Broadway, but at the time, he was doing another Mamet production, American Buffalo, in London. He expressed interest in appearing in the film adaptation. In 1989, Tokofsky proposed a role to Jack Lemmon. During this time, Kershner dropped out to make another film, RoboCop 2, as did Pacino with Sea of Love. Alec Baldwin, also attached, was earmarked to play the Richard Roma role vacated by Pacino. He reportedly left the project over a contract disagreement, the real reason being that Pacino was still being considered for Roma and would be cast over Baldwin if he elected to accept the role.

James Foley's agent sent Mamet's screenplay to Foley in early 1991, but Foley was hesitant to direct because he "wanted great actors, people with movie charisma, to give it watchability, especially since the locations were so restricted". Foley took the screenplay to Pacino, with whom he had been trying to work on a film for years. Foley was hired to direct, but would leave the production as well.

By March 1991, Tokofsky contacted Baldwin and begged him to reconsider doing the film. Baldwin's character Blake was specifically written for the actor and the film, and is not in the play. Tokofsky remembers, "Alec said, 'I've read 25 scripts and nothing is as good as this. OK. If you make it, I'll do it.'" The two arranged for an informal reading with Lemmon in Los Angeles. Subsequently, the three organized readings with several other actors. Lemmon remembered, "Some of the best damn actors you're ever going to see came in and read and I'm talking about names." Tokofsky's lawyer Jake Bloom called a meeting at the Creative Artists Agency, who represented many of the actors involved, and asked for their help. CAA showed little interest, but two of their clients, Ed Harris and Kevin Spacey, soon joined the cast.

Because of the film's modest budget, many of the actors took significant pay cuts. For example, Pacino cut his per-movie price from $6 million to $1.5 million, Lemmon was paid $1 million, and Baldwin received $250,000. Other actors, like Robert De Niro, Bruce Willis, Richard Gere and Joe Mantegna, expressed interest in the film. Mantegna had been in the original Broadway cast and won a Tony Award for Best Featured Actor in a Play at the 38th Tony Awards in 1985 for his portrayal of Roma.

When the cast was assembled, they spent three weeks in rehearsals. With a budget of $12.5 million, filming began in August 1991 at the Kaufman Astoria Studios in Queens, New York, and on location in Sheepshead Bay, Brooklyn, over 39 days. Harris remembered, "There were five and six-page scenes we would shoot all at once. It was more like doing a play at times [when] you'd get the continuity going." Alan Arkin said of the script, "What made it [challenging] was the language and the rhythms, which are enormously difficult to absorb." During filming, cast members would arrive outside of their required days, just to watch the other actors' performances.

The director of photography, Juan Ruiz Anchía, relied on low lighting and shadows. A color scheme of blues, greens and reds was used for the first part of the film, and the second half has a monochromatic blue-grey color scheme.

During production, Tokofsky and Zupnik had a falling out over money and credit for the film. Tokofsky sued to strip Zupnik of his producer's credit and share of the producer's fee. Zupnik claimed that he personally invested $2 million of the film's budget and countersued, claiming that Tokofsky was fired for embezzlement.

The setting is never explicitly stated. The play is set in Mamet's hometown of Chicago, Illinois. The film includes numerous references to New York City, including an establishing shot of a New York City Subway platform, followed by a close-up of a New York Telephone-branded payphone, NYPD police cars and insignia, and New York license plates. The George Aaronow character played by Arkin mentions almost making a sale in White Plains. A reflection in the subway windows at the film's end clearly shows the name Sheepshead Bay. Some film critics and journalists, however, have placed the setting in Chicago because of the many verbal references, including the Como Inn and Peterson and Western Avenues. Several Chicago suburbs are mentioned, including Morton Grove, Batavia and Kenilworth, and toward the end of the film the Dave Moss character played by Harris states that he's “going to Wisconsin”, as in the play. Exterior shots were filmed on location in Sheepshead Bay, Brooklyn.

== Reception ==
=== Box office ===
Glengarry Glen Ross had its world premiere at the 49th Venice International Film Festival, where Jack Lemmon won the Volpi Cup for Best Actor. In addition, it was originally slated to be shown at the Montreal World Film Festival, but it was necessary to show it out of competition because it was entered into competition at the Venice Film Festival at the same time. Instead, it was given its North American premiere at the 1992 Toronto International Film Festival. The film opened in wide release on October 2, 1992, in 416 theaters, grossing $2.1 million in its opening weekend. It made $10.7 million in North America, below its $12.5 million budget.

=== Critical response ===
The film has a rating of 95% on Rotten Tomatoes, based on 56 reviews, with an average rating of 8.5/10. The consensus reads, "This adaptation of David Mamet's play is every bit as compelling and witty as its source material, thanks in large part to a clever script and a bevy of powerhouse actors." On Metacritic, the film has a score of 82 out of 100, based on 30 critics, indicating "universal acclaim".

Owen Gleiberman, in his review for Entertainment Weekly, gave the film an "A" rating, praising Lemmon's performance as "a revelation" and describing his character as "the weaselly soul of Glengarry Glen Ross–Willy Loman turned into a one-liner".

In his review for the Chicago Sun-Times, Roger Ebert wrote, "Mamet's dialogue has a kind of logic, a cadence, that allows people to arrive in triumph at the ends of sentences we could not possibly have imagined. There is great energy in it. You can see the joy with which these actors get their teeth into these great lines, after living through movies in which flat dialogue serves only to advance the story."

In the Chicago Reader, Jonathan Rosenbaum lauded Foley for his "excellent feeling for the driven and haunted jive rhythms of David Mamet, macho invective and all" and called the film "a superb 1992 delivery of [Mamet's] tour de force theater piece".

The Chicago Tribune's Dave Kehr hedged his praise, writing that the film was "a well written, well staged and well acted piece, though there is something musty in its aesthetic - that of the huge, bellowing method performance, plastered over a flimsy, one-set world".

Newsweek's Jack Kroll observed, "Baldwin is sleekly sinister in the role of Blake, a troubleshooter called in to shake up the salesmen. He shakes them up, all right, but this character (not in the original play) also shakes up the movie's toned balance with his sheer noise and scatological fury".

In his review for The New York Times, Vincent Canby praised the portrayal of "the utterly demonic skill with which these foulmouthed characters carve one another up in futile attempts to stave off disaster. It's also because of the breathtaking wizardry with which Mr. Mamet and Mr. Foley have made a vivid, living film that preserves the claustrophobic nature of the original stage work."

In his review for Time, Richard Corliss wrote, "A peerless ensemble of actors fills Glengarry Glen Ross with audible glares and shudders. The play was zippy black comedy about predators in twilight; the film is a photo-essay, shot in morgue closeup, about the difficulty most people have convincing themselves that what they do matters."

However, Desson Howe's review in The Washington Post criticized Foley's direction, writing that it "doesn't add much more than the street between. If his intention is to create a sense of claustrophobia, he also creates the (presumably) unwanted effect of a soundstage. There is no evidence of life outside the immediate world of the movie."

=== Legacy ===
The film has had an enduring legacy for its memorable dialogue and performances, particularly the "Always Be Closing" speech by Alec Baldwin, whose character Blake was created for the film adaptation to make the pressures of sales work more explicit. In 2012, on the 20th anniversary of its release, David Wagner of The Atlantic dubbed it a cult classic, and Tim Grierson of Deadspin cited it as one of the "quintessential modern movies about masculinity". In 2014, English critic Philip French described the ensemble of Jack Lemmon, Al Pacino, Alan Arkin, Ed Harris, Kevin Spacey and Alec Baldwin as "one of the best American casts ever assembled".

In 2005, Baldwin performed in a Saturday Night Live Christmas parody of the "Coffee is for closers" scene, portraying Winter's Breath, a head elf sent by Santa Claus to motivate elves making toys for Christmas. Also, in the 2017 film The Boss Baby, the main character, voiced by Baldwin, says "Cookies are for closers" in a parody of the line from Glengarry Glen Ross.

=== Awards and nominations ===
Award	Category	Nominee(s)	Result
20/20 Awards	Best Picture		Nominated
20/20 Awards	Best Supporting Actor	Alec Baldwin	Won (Tied)
20/20 Awards	Best Supporting Actor	Jack Lemmon	Won (Tied)
20/20 Awards	Best Adapted Screenplay	David Mamet	Nominated
Academy Awards	Best Supporting Actor	Al Pacino	Nominated
Awards Circuit Community Awards	Best Actor in a Supporting Role	Jack Lemmon	Nominated
Awards Circuit Community Awards	Best Actor in a Supporting Role	Al Pacino	Nominated
Awards Circuit Community Awards	Best Adapted Screenplay	David Mamet	Nominated
Awards Circuit Community Awards	Best Cast Ensemble		Won
Chicago Film Critics Association Awards	Best Supporting Actor	Al Pacino	Nominated
Chicago Film Critics Association Awards	Best Screenplay	David Mamet	Nominated
Deauville American Film Festival	International Critics Awards	James Foley	Nominated
Golden Globe Awards	Best Supporting Actor – Motion Picture	Al Pacino	Nominated
National Board of Review Awards	Top Ten Films		3rd Place
National Board of Review Awards	Best Actor	Jack Lemmon	Won
Southeastern Film Critics Association Awards	Best Picture		10th Place
Valladolid International Film Festival	Golden Spike	James Foley	Won
Valladolid International Film Festival	Best Actor	Alan Arkin, Alec Baldwin, Ed Harris, Jack Lemmon, Al Pacino, Jonathan Pryce and Kevin Spacey	Won
Venice International Film Festival	Golden Lion	James Foley	Nominated
Venice International Film Festival	Best Actor	Jack Lemmon	Won
Writers Guild of America Awards	Best Screenplay – Based on Material Previously Produced or Published	David Mamet	Nominated

- Empire magazine voted it the 470th greatest film in its "500 Greatest Movies of All Time" list.
