= Most Beautiful Island =

- Theatrical release poster
- Directed by: Ana Asensio
- Written by: Ana Asensio
- Produced by: Ana Asensio; Larry Fessenden; Noah Greenberg; Chadd Harbold; Jenn Wexler
- Starring: Ana Asensio; Natasha Romanova; David Little; Nicholas Tucci; Larry Fessenden; Caprice Benedetti
- Cinematography: Noah Greenberg
- Edited by: Carl Ambrose; Francisco Bello
- Music by: Jeffery Alan Jones
- Production company: Glass Eye Pix
- Distributed by: Orion Pictures; Samuel Goldwyn Films
- Release dates: March 12, 2017 (SXSW); November 3, 2017 (United States)
- Running time: 80 minutes
- Country: United States
- Language: English

Most Beautiful Island is a 2017 American drama film written and directed by Ana Asensio. The film stars Ana Asensio, Natasha Romanova, David Little, Nicholas Tucci, Larry Fessenden and Caprice Benedetti. The film was released on November 3, 2017, by Orion Pictures and Samuel Goldwyn Films. Most Beautiful Island was nominated for the John Cassavetes Award at the 2018 Film Independent Spirit Awards.

== Plot summary ==
Luciana is an illegal immigrant to New York City. Phone calls to her family indicate that she is living in hiding due to some past transgression in her native Barcelona for which her mother assures her she's been forgiven but which Luciana does not want to return to face. Due to her undocumented status, Luciana is forced to work menial, cash-pay jobs, such as babysitting and sign waving at a fast food restaurant. Through the latter job she meets Olga, a Russian emigre who seems to live a more lavish lifestyle despite herself being undocumented. After Luciana suffers a number of personal and economic setbacks, Olga offers her an opportunity to fill in her for at her second job. Luciana agrees, although Olga does not reveal the nature of the work beyond providing Luciana an address and instructions to arrive in evening wear. Unable to afford the proper clothes, Luciana clandestinely vandalizes an outfit at a local boutique and convinces the store to sell it to her at a discount.

Luciana arrives at the address Olga provided her, where she's led into a basement, provided a locked purse, and given a second address to go to late that evening. Unable to pay cab fare, Luciana tricks a driver into providing her a ride, then hides her belongings in a garbage can when the bouncer demands she only bring the locked purse inside. Luciana is taken into a subterranean chamber, where she's made to stand in an unfurnished room along with several other women—including Olga—all in black cocktail dresses and holding identical purses. When Luciana asks Olga what's happening, Olga tells her that she wanted money and this was a way to make it.

Luciana witnesses women being led into another room, with some leaving holding large stacks of money; others fail to leave after emitting frightened screams. Asking to use the bathroom, Luciana attempts to escape, but is brought back to the room with the other women. Eventually, she and Olga are brought into a chamber with a glass coffin surrounded by men and women. A master of ceremonies explains that the venue is an underground betting parlor where individuals wager on the outcome of extreme scenarios. Opening Olga and Luciana's purses, he removes a pair of venomous spiders, and explains that each woman will take turns lying nude in the coffin with the spider on top of them for a predetermined interval; the other woman will be tasked with making sure the spider maintains skin contact. Luciana goes first, successfully lying still and winning her round. During her round, Olga begins panicking and begging for the spider to be removed, but Luciana saves her by exploiting a loophole in the game's rules and holding the spider herself. Olga technically wins her round and both women are paid large sums of money for their success. In the aftermath of the game, the head of the organization praises Luciana for her ingenuity and tells Olga that she will be her replacement. Luciana takes her money and flees, collecting her belongings from the trash.

== Cast ==
- Ana Asensio as Luciana
- Natasha Romanova as Olga
- David Little as Doctor Horowitz
- Nicholas Tucci as Niko
- Larry Fessenden as Rudy
- Caprice Benedetti as Vanessa
- Anna Myrha as Nadia
- Ami Sheth as Benedita
- Miriam A. Hyman as Bikie
- Sara Visser as Katarin
- Natalia Zvereva as Ewa
- Sorika Horng as Mai
- Fenella A. Chudoba as Alina
- David Serero as Dominic

== Release ==
The film premiered at South by Southwest on March 12, 2017. On June 20, 2017, Orion Pictures and Samuel Goldwyn Films acquired distribution rights to the film. The film was released on November 3, 2017, by Orion Pictures and Samuel Goldwyn Films.

== Reception ==
On review aggregator website Rotten Tomatoes, the film has an approval rating of 93% based on 44 reviews with an average rating of 7.01/10. The site's consensus reads: "Most Beautiful Island plunges audiences into a little-seen sector of society, with writer-director Ana Asensio's fearless performance leading the way". On Metacritic, the film has a score of 73 out of 100 based on 11 critics indicating "generally favorable reviews".
