= Goat Girl (film) =

- Theatrical release poster
- Spanish: La niña de la cabra
- Directed by: Ana Asensio
- Screenplay by: Ana Asensio
- Produced by: Pedro Hernández Santos; Stefan Schmitz; Vlad Radulescu
- Starring: Alessandra González; Juncal Fernández; Lorena López; Javier Pereira; Enrique Villén
- Cinematography: David Tudela
- Production companies: Aquí y Allí Films; Avalon PC; La niña de la cabra AIE; Avanpost Media
- Distributed by: Avalon
- Release dates: 18 March 2025 (Málaga); 11 April 2025 (Spain)
- Countries: Spain; Romania
- Language: Spanish

Goat Girl (Spanish: La niña de la cabra) is a 2025 coming-of-age drama film written and directed by Ana Asensio starring Alessandra González and Juncal Fernández. It is a Spanish-Romanian co-production.

The film premiered at the 28th Málaga Film Festival on 18 March 2025 ahead of its 11 April 2025 theatrical release in Spain by Avalon.

== Plot ==
In May 1988 Madrid, a girl set to make her first communion begins to question herself about death and befriends a gipsy girl inseparable from her goat.

== Cast ==
- Alessandra González as Elena
- Juncal Fernández as Serezade
- Lorena López as Marisa
- Javier Pereira
- Enrique Villén as Carrillo
- Silvia Torregrosa
- Zaira Romero

== Production ==
The film is a Spanish-Romanian co-production by Aquí y Allí Films, Avalon, and La niña de la cabra AIE alongside Avanpost Media with backing from ICAA, the Madrid regional administration, and Eurimages. It was filmed in Madrid in 2023. Shooting locations included the parish church of San Matías (Hortaleza).

== Release ==
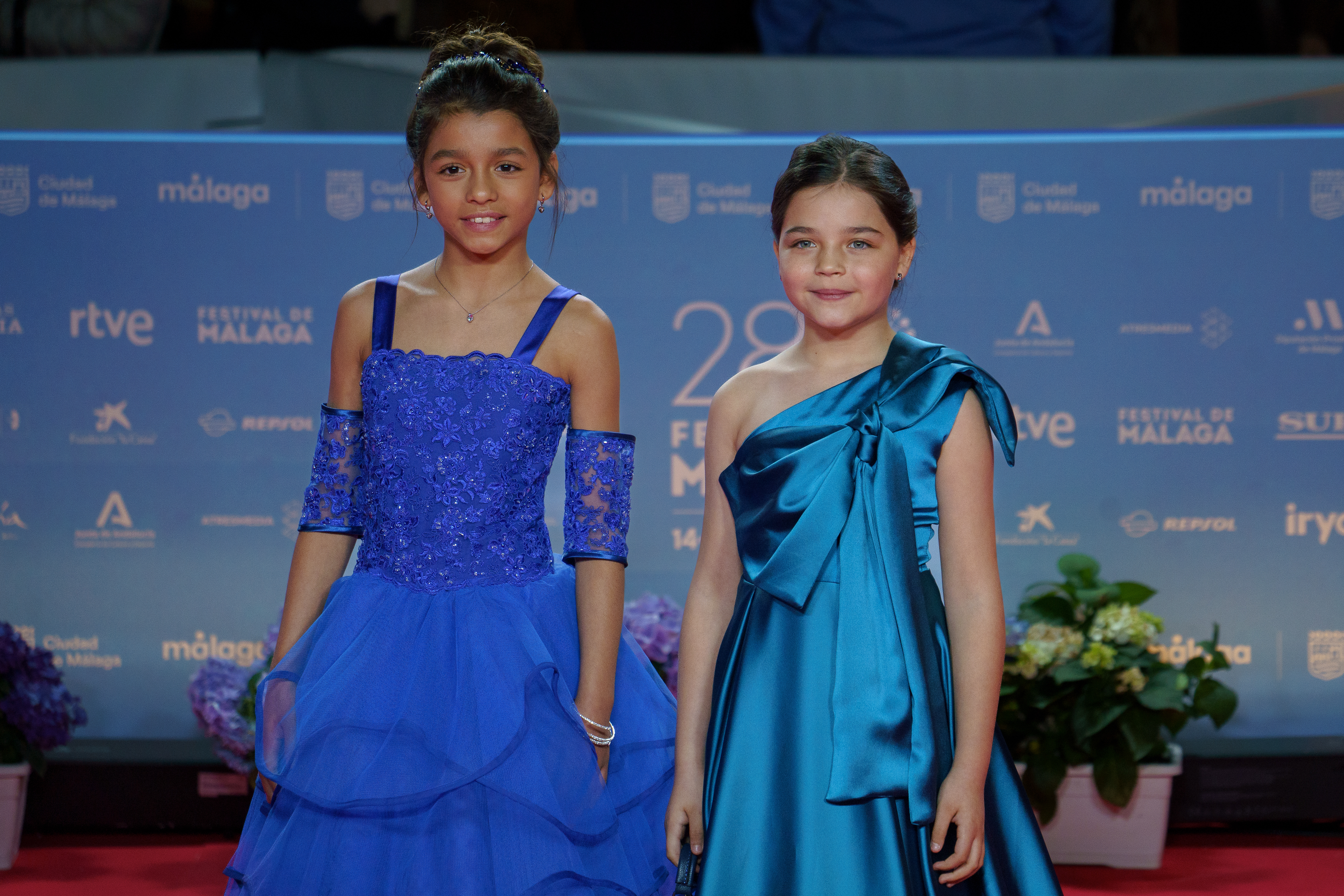
Stars Juncal Fernández and Alessandra González attending the red carpet of the 28th Málaga Film Festival in March 2025

Alpha Violet boarded international sales rights. The film was presented at the 28th Málaga Film Festival on 18 March 2025. Distributed by Avalon, it was released theatrically in Spain on 11 April 2025.

== Reception ==
Júlia Olmo of Cineuropa wrote that [Goat Girl is] "a movie that embodies what it sets out to be – sincere and beautiful".

Javier Ocaña of El País wrote that Asensio crafted "a parable about the anguish of innocence with two lovely characters", also pointing out that Goat Girl may well be a sister film to Paz Vega's Rita.

Juan Pando of Fotogramas rated the film 3 out of 5 stars, praising Alessandra González's gaze and photogenic presence while negatively citing how the film takes itself too seriously.

== See also ==
- List of Spanish films of 2025
