= Jicky Schnee =

Scottish model and actress

Jicky Schnee is a Scottish model and a film, television and stage actress. Schnee was named after the Guerlain perfume "Jicky". Her modeling career took off when she unknowingly patted Steven Meisel's dog in an elevator.

== Filmography ==
=== Film ===
Year	Title	Role	Notes
2003	Flavors	Jenni	
2004	Mind the Gap	Denny	
2007	Dedication	Mandy the Waitress	
2009	Perestroika	Jill	
2009	Split Ends	Ashley	
2009	The Afterlight	Claire	
2013	Lowlife	Clara	

=== Television ===
Year	Title	Role	Notes
2004	The Jury	Sara Gates	Episode: "The Honeymoon Suite"
2004	The Buried Secret of M. Night Shyamalan	Jennifer	TV film
2005	Law & Order: Criminal Intent	Dana Candon	Episode: "The Unblinking Eye"
2006	Hope & Faith	Betsy	Episodes: "The Restaurant", "Jay Date"
2008	Lipstick Jungle	Mariska Havel	Episode: "Chapter 2: Nothing Sacred"
2008	Living in Captivity	Alex	TV film
2010	Law & Order: Criminal Intent	Jill Peak	Episodes: "Loyalty: Parts 1 & 2"
