= Seema Rahmani =

American actress

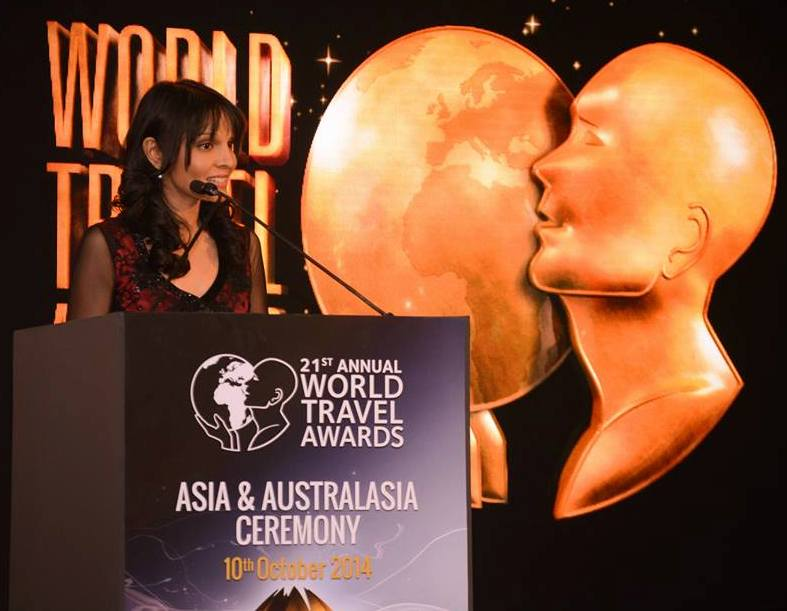
- Rahmani hosting The World Travel Awards Show, Asia & Australasia, 2014
- Born: 3 December 1969 (age 56); Kuwait
- Occupations: Actress, TV presenter
- Years active: 2000–present

Seema Rahmani is an American film actress and television presenter.

== Early and personal life ==
Seema was born and raised in Kuwait. Her family's native place is Pune, India. At the age of 15, she moved to the United States. She completed her high school education in Newark, New York. She graduated with a Bachelor of Science with a Minor in Mathematics from State University of New York. She holds a Master of Arts in Marketing from Emerson College, Boston.

== Career ==
In 1997, Seema left a PR corporate career in Los Angeles, California and joined theater, thus beginning her acting career. She soon landed stints in two television series - Alias for ABC and Roswell for Warner Brothers 2000–2001. Rahmani moved to India in 2003.

She hosted a show about animals named Heavy Petting between 2007 and 2012.

== Filmography ==
=== Films ===
Year	Film	Role	Language	Notes
2004	Arjun Verma	Sameera	Hindi	
2005	Banana Brothers	Reema	Hindi	
2005	Hum Kaun Hai?	Maria	Hindi	
2005	Sins	Rosemary	English	
2005	Missed Call	Rose/Nisha	Hindi	
2006	Shakalaka Boom Boom	Seema	Hindi	
2007	Loins of Punjab Presents	Sania	English	
2010	Gangor	Sheetal	English, Bengali	
2012	Love, Wrinkle-free	Natalie	English	
2012	Good Night Good Morning	Moira	English	Also executive producer
2013	Reprise	Meena	English	
2014	Unfreedom	Chandra	English	
2015	Kahani	Memsahib	Hindi	

=== Television ===
Year	Title	Channel	Role	Notes
2007-2012	Heavy Petting	NDTV Good Times	Travelling Show Host	Animal Show
2007-2010	The Big Fat Indian Wedding	NDTV-Good Times	Travelling Show Host	
2006	Karamchand	Sony TV	Dr. Rita Kapoor	
2001	Alias	ABC	Sara	
2000	Roswell	Warner Brothers	Nurse	

=== Theatre ===
- Life Like Rainbow Grey
