= Walkaway (film) =

- Directed by: Shailja Gupta
- Written by: Shailja Gupta; Ruchika Lalwani
- Screenplay by: Shailja Gupta
- Produced by: Shailja Gupta; Shrikant Mohta; Mahendra Soni; Varun Shah; Ruchika Lalwani; Shawn Rice; Executive producers Kurush Mistry; Neelkanth Ghanwat; Nishith Shah; Co-producers; Shruti Tiwari; Hursh Singh; Misbal Dalvi; Vinay Sharma
- Starring: Manu Narayan; Samrat Chakrabarti; Manish Dayal; Saniv Jhaveri; Deepti Gupta; Carrie Anne James Pallavi Sharda; Ami Sheth
- Cinematography: Trisha Solyn
- Edited by: Nishany Radhakrishnan; Co-editors; Sanjay Sharma; Shailja Gupta
- Music by: Vishal & Shekhar; Ram Sampath; Sagar Desai; Samrat Chakrabarti; Kurush Mistry
- Release date: October 29, 2010
- Running time: 1 hour 37 minutes
- Country: United States
- Languages: English; Tamil; Hindi; French
- Budget: $150,000

Walkaway is an independent romantic comedy film directed and produced by Shailja Gupta released in 2010. Walkaway has a 40% on Rotten Tomatoes based on 5 reviews with an average rating of 3.6 out of 10.

== Synopsis ==
Four intersecting stories, each exploring different aspects of love and companionship, as four friends struggle to find their way through the meanders of Indian matrimony, in a bittersweet attempt to combine their deep-rooted tradition and 'modern' New York life in perfect harmony.

Set in New York, this film mocks the clutches of social obligations on 'modern' professionals from India, and explores subtleties of the Indian mega-institution of marriage, from the now-veiled urban dowry system to the overwhelming compromises demanded of a cross-cultural couple. Darius, Vinay, Shridhar and Soham - single, dating, engaged and married, struggle to maintain some semblance of sanity while questioning themselves, their desires and choices, and the importance of unshakeable traditions. Join them and their loved ones on this journey fraught with ethnic and generational differences, and the pressures of modern relationships and careers. What will they choose to walk away from... family, love, their roots?

== Cast ==
- Manu Narayan as Darius, The Charmer
- Samrat Chakrabarti as Sridhar, The Village Boy
- Manish Dayal as Vinay, The Endearing Spoiled Brat
- Saniv Jhaveri as Soham, The Prince Charming
- Deepti Gupta as Nidhi, The Nagging Wife
- Carrie Anne James as Genevieve, The Dreamer
- Pallavi Sharda as Sia, The Practical
- Ami Sheth as Anu, The Wild Child
