= Perestroika (film) =

- Directed by: Slava Tsukerman
- Written by: Slava Tsukerman
- Produced by: Nina V. Kerova; Slava Tsukerman
- Starring: Sam Robards; Ally Sheedy; F. Murray Abraham
- Cinematography: Mikhail Iskandarov
- Edited by: Arnie Schlissel
- Music by: Aleksandr Zhurbin
- Production companies: Artphile; REF Productions
- Release date: March 20, 2009 (limited)
- Running time: 116 minutes
- Countries: United States; Russia
- Language: English

Perestroika is a 2009 American-Russian drama film written and directed by Slava Tsukerman and starring Sam Robards, Ally Sheedy and F. Murray Abraham.

== Cast ==
- Sam Robards as Sasha
- F. Murray Abraham as Prof. Gross
- Oksana Stashenko as Natasha
- Ally Sheedy as Helen
- Jicky Schnee as Jill
- Mariya Andreyeva as Elena
- Andrey Sergeev as Krimsky

== Reception ==
The film has a 57% approval rating on Rotten Tomatoes based on 14 reviews, with an average rating of 5.9/10.
