= Richard Roma =

Character from Glengarry Glen Ross

- First appearance: Glengarry Glen Ross
- Last appearance: Glengarry Glen Ross (film)
- Created by: David Mamet
- Portrayed by: Jack Shepherd (1983); Joe Mantegna (1984); Al Pacino (1992 film); Liev Schreiber (2005); Aidan Gillen (2007); Bobby Cannavale (2012); Manu Narayan (2012); Christian Slater (2017); Kieran Culkin (2025)

In-universe information
- Nickname: Ricky
- Occupation: Real estate agent
- Nationality: American

Richard "Ricky" Roma is a fictional character from David Mamet's 1983 play Glengarry Glen Ross and its 1992 film adaptation. Roma has been portrayed by a range of actors, including Joe Mantegna, Al Pacino and Liev Schreiber, although the role was originated by Jack Shepherd.

Actors portraying Roma have won and been nominated for multiple stage awards—both Mantegna and Schreiber received a Tony Award for Best Featured Actor in a Play for their performances, while Shepherd earned a Laurence Olivier Award for Best Actor in a New Play. In film, Pacino received nominations for both the Academy Award for Best Supporting Actor and the Golden Globe for Best Performance by an Actor in a Supporting Role in a Motion Picture.

== Conceptual history ==
Roma, along with the rest of the salesmen in Glengarry Glen Ross, was written based on playwright David Mamet's previous experiences selling "worthless" Arizona real estate from an office in Chicago. Mamet described the colorful dialogue used by the character—which has also been described as "following in the steps of Arthur Miller's Death of a Salesman”—as having been influenced by overheard conversations and street slang.

== Plot ==
When I walked on that stage, my feeling was: I am that matador. And I'm gonna kill every bull that comes into the arena.

— Joe Mantegna on playing Roma in Chicago

Richard Roma is a cutthroat and successful real estate salesman who derives his success from eloquent and convincing pitches, preying on insecure clients with delusions of power and machismo. During the events of Glengarry Glen Ross, Roma is in contention for a prize to be awarded to the top "closer" at his firm, having just closed a large sale to a man called Lingk. Overnight, the firm's office is burgled, and promising real estate leads are stolen. Lingk arrives at the office during the investigation, forced by his wife to cancel his land purchase during his cooling-off period. Roma attempts to distract Lingk in hopes of trapping him in the sale, but well-intentioned comments by the firm's manager, John Williamson, catch Roma in a lie, and Lingk demands a refund on his purchase. Furious, Roma berates Williamson in front of the entire office, and storms out, threatening to quit.

== Reception ==
=== Character ===
Writing for The New York Times, Mickey Rapkin considered Roma to be the central character of the play, describing him as "the salesman’s salesman, a shark in a sharkskin suit". Mantegna has stated that he feels Roma is not a "sleazy" character, but simply a man who can convince customers to follow through on their dreams. Reviewing a 2012 revival at the La Jolla Playhouse, Charles McNulty of the Los Angeles Times compared Roma to a Giacomo Casanova-type figure, adding that "when Roma puts the moves on a prospective buyer, it's as though he's making love to them". The Guardian's Mark Lawson wrote that Roma is an amoral character, considering him a "super-schmoozer". In the same article, Aidan Gillen, then portraying the character in the Apollo Theatre in London, described him as a "cunt with a romantic, poetic streak".

=== Depictions ===
Portrayals of Roma have often been received positively by critics. Schreiber's portrayal in the 2005 Broadway revival was praised as that of "a most crafty spider indeed", with the actor's grasp of the character's Chicago accent praised for its subtlety. Gillen's 2007 turn as Roma has been described as "sweaty and aggressive with a hard, rodent-like quality", with reviewer Lyn Gardner of The Guardian finding the performance excellent. Manu Narayan's 2012 depiction was described as "adding velocity" to a "high testosterone" production, coming across as rhythmic and an effective focal point in the piece. Reviewing the 1992 film version, Roger Ebert praised Pacino's acting, writing "any kid can play a war hero. But it takes a real man to play a busted-down real estate salesman".

=== Accolades ===
Shepherd's original performance as Roma earned the actor a Laurence Olivier Award for Best Actor in a New Play in 1983. On Broadway, both Mantegna and Schreiber have won the Tony Award for Best Featured Actor in a Play while portraying Roma—Mantegna at the 38th Tony Awards in 1984, and Schreiber at the 59th Tony Awards in 2005. Pacino's role in the film adaptation earned him several award nominations, including the Academy Award for Best Supporting Actor and the Golden Globe for Best Performance by an Actor in a Supporting Role in a Motion Picture, both times losing out to Gene Hackman in Unforgiven.
