= Ana Asensio =

Spanish actress and filmmaker

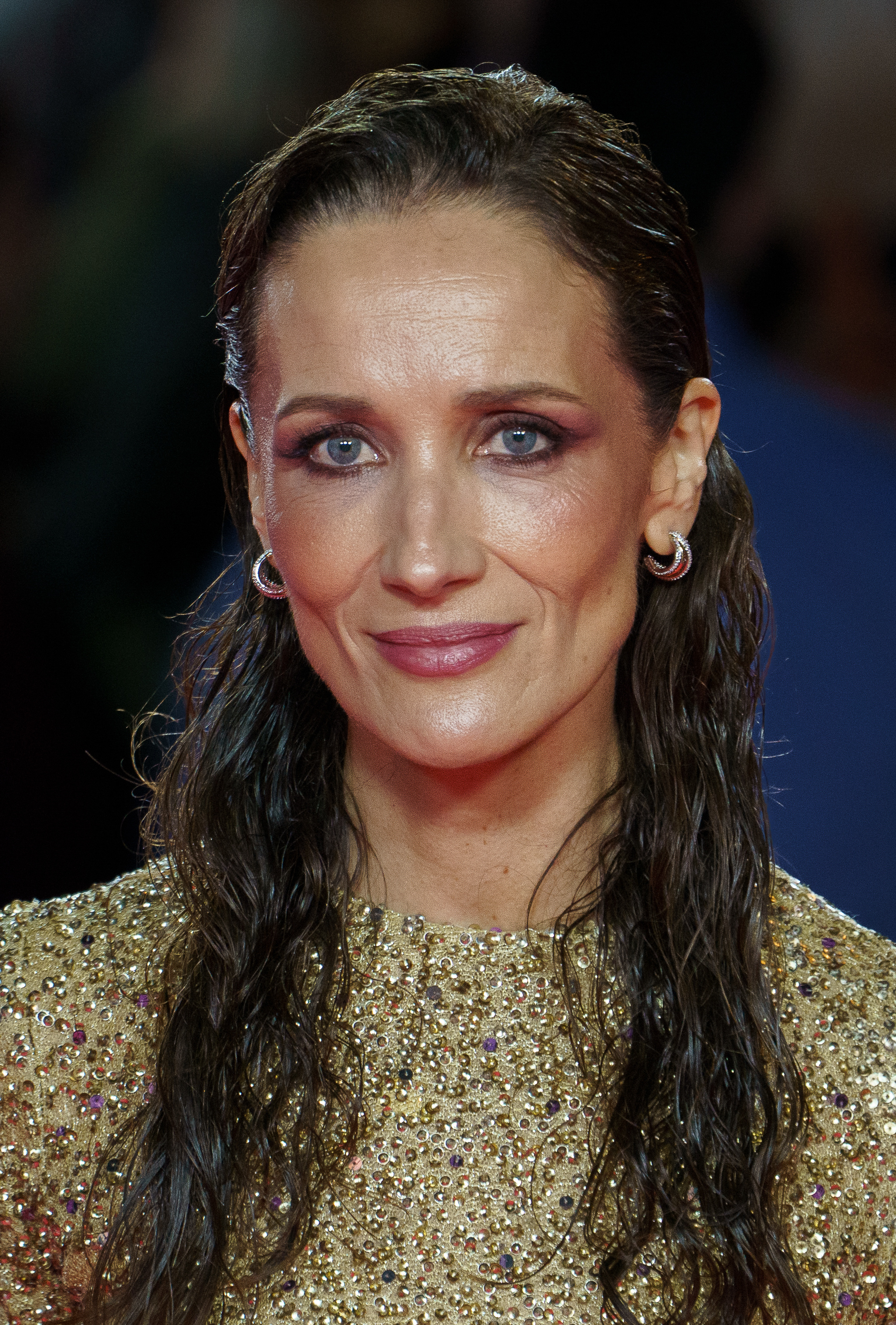
- Asensio in 2025
- Born: Madrid, Spain
- Occupations: Actress; director; writer

Ana Asensio is an actress and filmmaker born in Madrid and currently living in New York City.

== Career ==
Asensio got her professional start acting in children's plays while she was studying Acting and Philosophy at Complutense University of Madrid.

Her directorial debut Most Beautiful Island premiered at the 2017 SXSW Film Festival where it was awarded the narrative grand jury prize for best film. Asensio wrote the screenplay and played the leading role. Most Beautiful Island was nominated for the John Cassavetes Award at the 2018 Independent Spirit Awards. It has received a 93% positive rating on Rotten Tomatoes.

Ana Asensio was a lead in the popular Spanish television series Nada es para siempre.

Most Beautiful Island was followed by Goat Girl (2025), presented at the 28th Málaga Film Festival.

== Filmography ==
=== Movies ===
- I Miss You (2019)
- Most Beautiful Island (2017)
- Like Me (2017)
- The Archive (2015)
- Carne Cruda (2011)
- Zenith (2010)
- The Afterlight (2009)
- The Kovak Box (2006)
- Betty la Flaca (2006)
- White (2005)
- Alone (2004)
- El lápiz del carpintero (2003)
- Intacto (2001)

=== TV Series ===
- Todo es possible en el bajo (2012)
- Las chicas de oro (2010)
- Mujeres de vida alegre (2010)
- Planta 25 (TV Series) (2008)
- Nada es para siempre (1999–2000)
- Señor Alcalde (1998)
- Más que amigos

== Personal life ==
In 2001 Asensio moved to New York City. She is married to film director Craig William Macneill.
