= Neck Road station =

New York City Subway station in Brooklyn

Neck Road
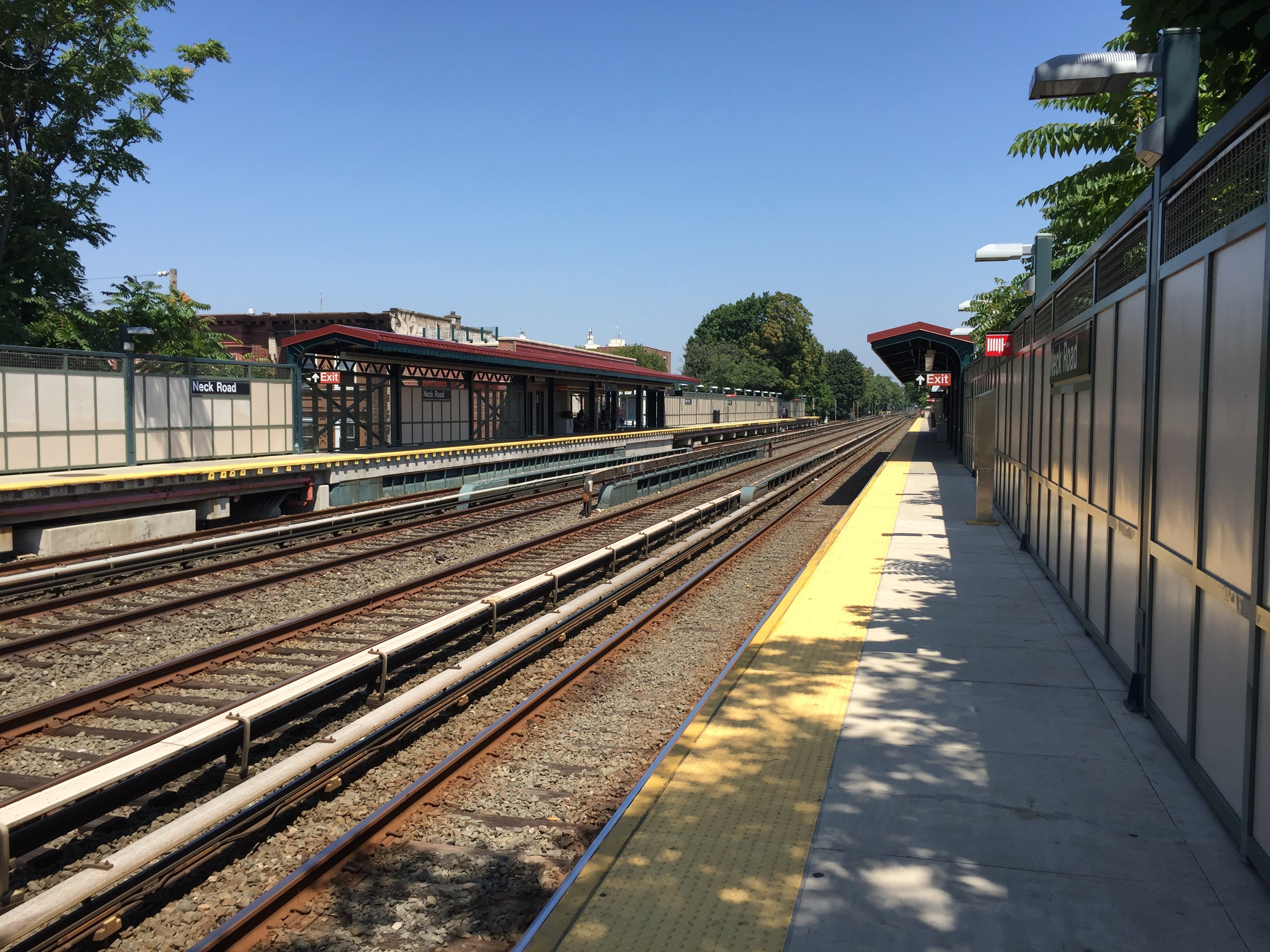
- View from northbound platform

Station statistics
- Address: Gravesend Neck Road & East 16th Street; Brooklyn, New York
- Borough: Brooklyn
- Locale: Homecrest
- Coordinates: 40.595124°N 73.95528°W
- Division: B (BMT)
- Line: BMT Brighton Line
- Services: Q (all times)
- Structure: Embankment
- Platforms: 2 side platforms
- Tracks: 4

Other information
- Opened: August 23, 1907; 119 years ago

Traffic
- 2025: 1,006,699 ▲3.6%
- Rank: 309 out of 423
Services
Preceding station	New York City Subway	Following station
Avenue U toward 96th Street	Local	Sheepshead Bay toward Coney Island–Stillwell Avenue
does not stop here
Former services
Preceding station	Long Island Rail Road	Following station
King's Highway toward Manhattan Beach Junction	Manhattan Beach Branch	Sheepshead Bay toward Manhattan Beach
Terminus	Manhattan Beach Branch Racetrack spur	Race Track Terminus
Location
Location within New York City Subway
Location within New York City
Location within New York
Track layout
Street map
Station service legend
Symbol	Description
Stops all times	Stops all times

The Neck Road station (formerly Gravesend Neck Road station) is a local station on the BMT Brighton Line of the New York City Subway. It is located at Gravesend Neck Road between East 15th and East 16th Streets in Homecrest, Brooklyn. The station is served by the Q train at all times.

== History ==
This station opened on August 23, 1907.

On August 1, 1920, a tunnel under Flatbush Avenue opened, connecting the Brighton Line to the Broadway subway in Manhattan. At the same time, the line's former track connections to the Fulton Street Elevated were severed. Subway trains from Manhattan and elevated trains from Franklin Avenue served Brighton Line stations, sharing the line to Coney Island.

This station underwent reconstruction from December 2008 to January 2010. Both platforms were rebuilt with new windscreens, canopies, and tactile strip edges. A temporary platform over the express tracks was used to provide service on the side that was under rebuilding. In 2010, the foundation of the LIRR station was excavated to street grade to allow expansion of the station house and installation of the Manhattan-bound platform staircase. The retaining wall and staircase facing Gravesend Neck Road remain intact. Construction continued in 2011 with a mural installation along the southbound platform staircase, and preparation of retail space for newsstand occupancy.

== Station layout ==
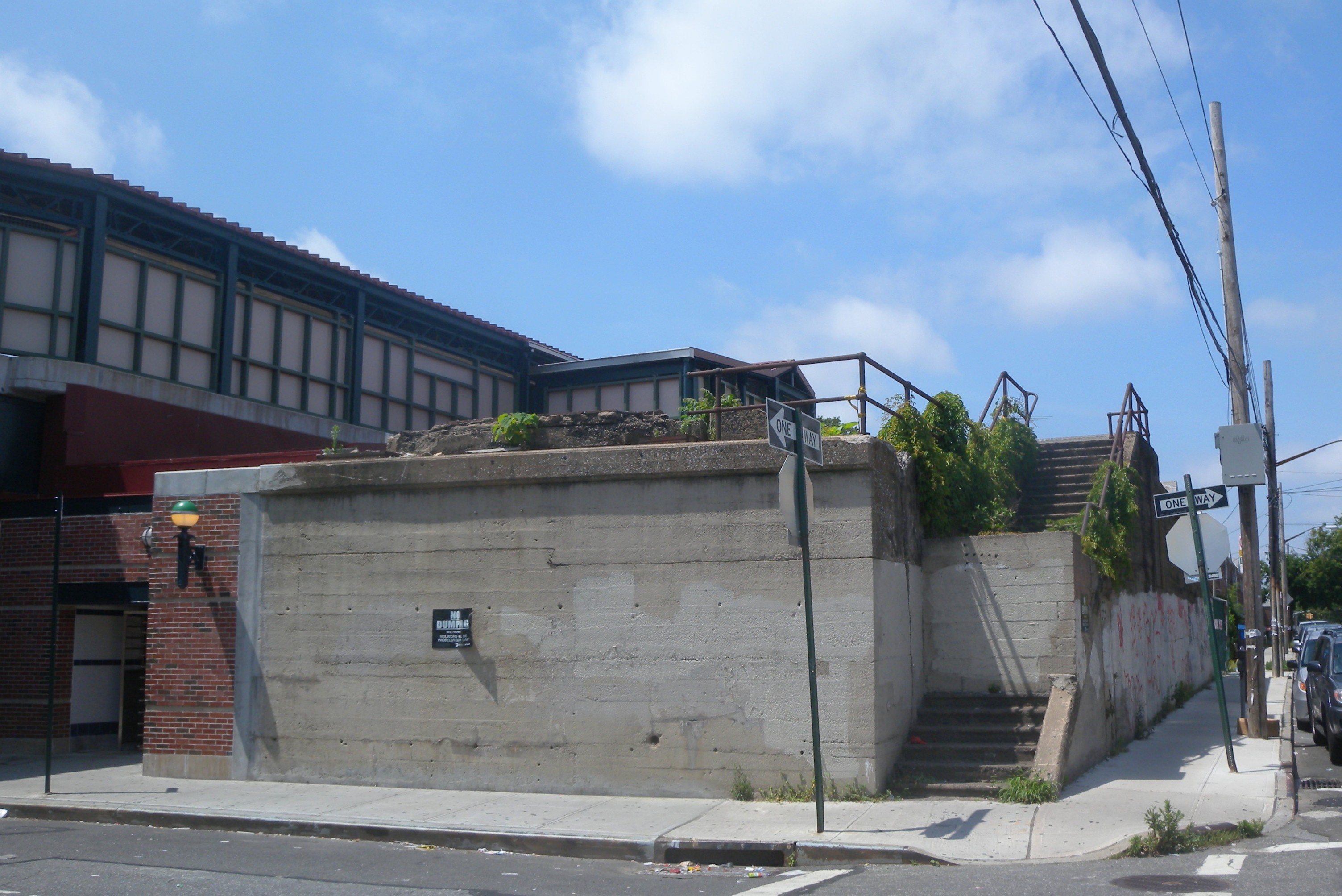
Former Neck Road LIRR station

This station has two side platforms and four tracks. The center tracks are used by the B express train when it operates on weekdays. Like the rest of the Brighton Line between Avenue H and Sheepshead Bay, it is situated on an embankment.

Both platforms have beige windscreens with green outlines and frames along their entire lengths and red canopies with green frames in the center. The station signs are in the standard black plates in white lettering and lamp posts are on all support columns of the windscreens in the non-canopied areas. The Coney Island-bound platform has a storage area above the mezzanine staircase.

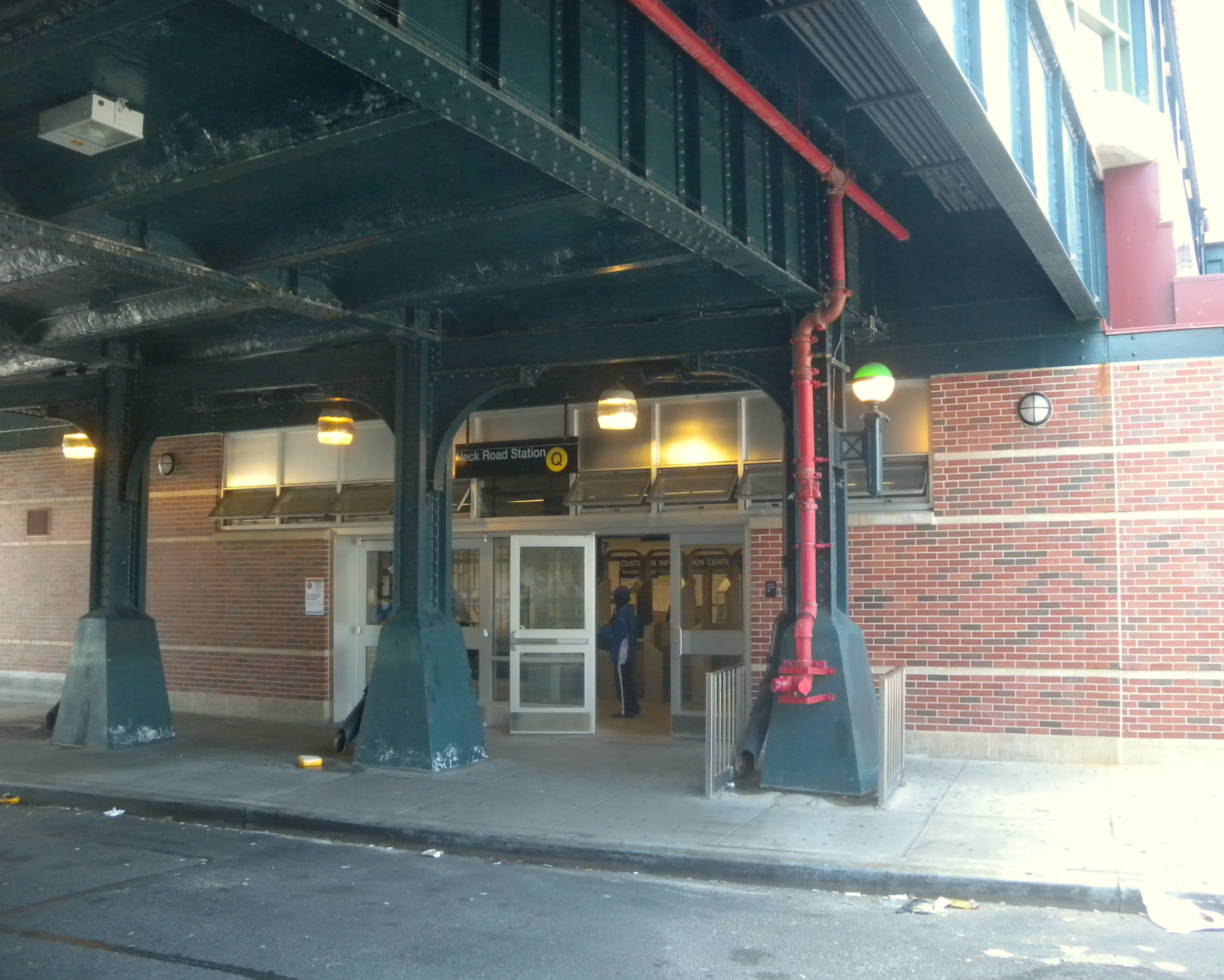
Station entrance

To the east of this station are the remains of a station on the former Manhattan Beach Branch of the Long Island Rail Road, also named Neck Road. Until the mid-1920s, this line ran parallel to the Brighton Line from just south of Avenue H, where it branched off from the LIRR's Bay Ridge Branch, to Sheepshead Bay, where it diverged east to Manhattan Beach, Brooklyn. While much of the Manhattan Beach right-of-way has been built over, the station foundation and staircases remain. The station had two tracks and two side platforms. A spur also branched off just south of Neck Road and crossed towards the now-razed Sheepshead Bay Race Track.

=== Exit ===
The station has one ground-level station house directly underneath the tracks and platforms on the north side of Neck Road. It has a token booth, a single standard MetroCard vending machine, small turnstile bank, two gates, and a double-wide staircase to each platform. Both staircase landings have two full height turnstiles leading directly to the sidewalk. The ones on the Coney Island-bound side are exit-only while the Manhattan-bound side has one for exit-only and another for entry and exit.

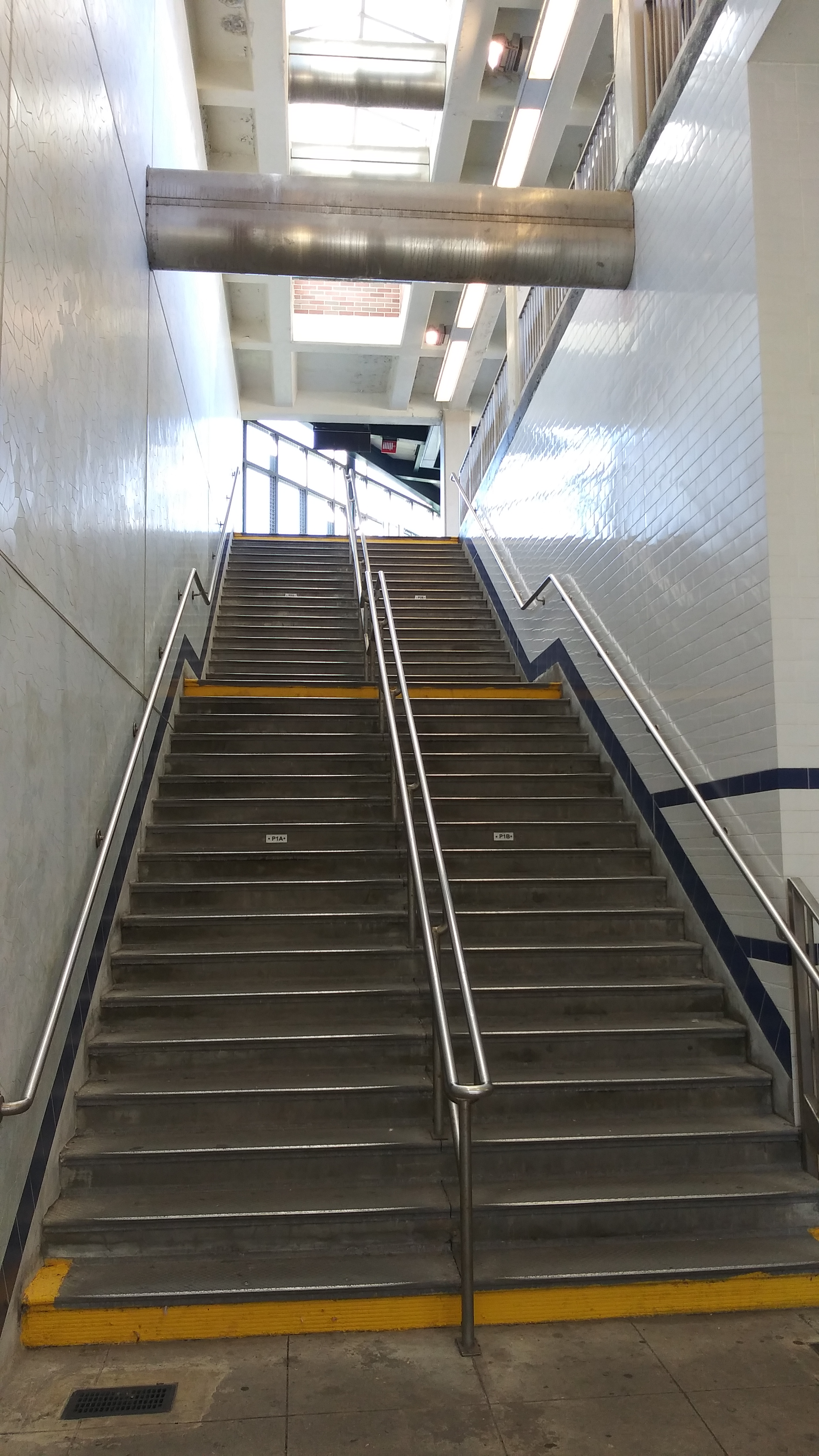
Staircase leading to the southbound platform

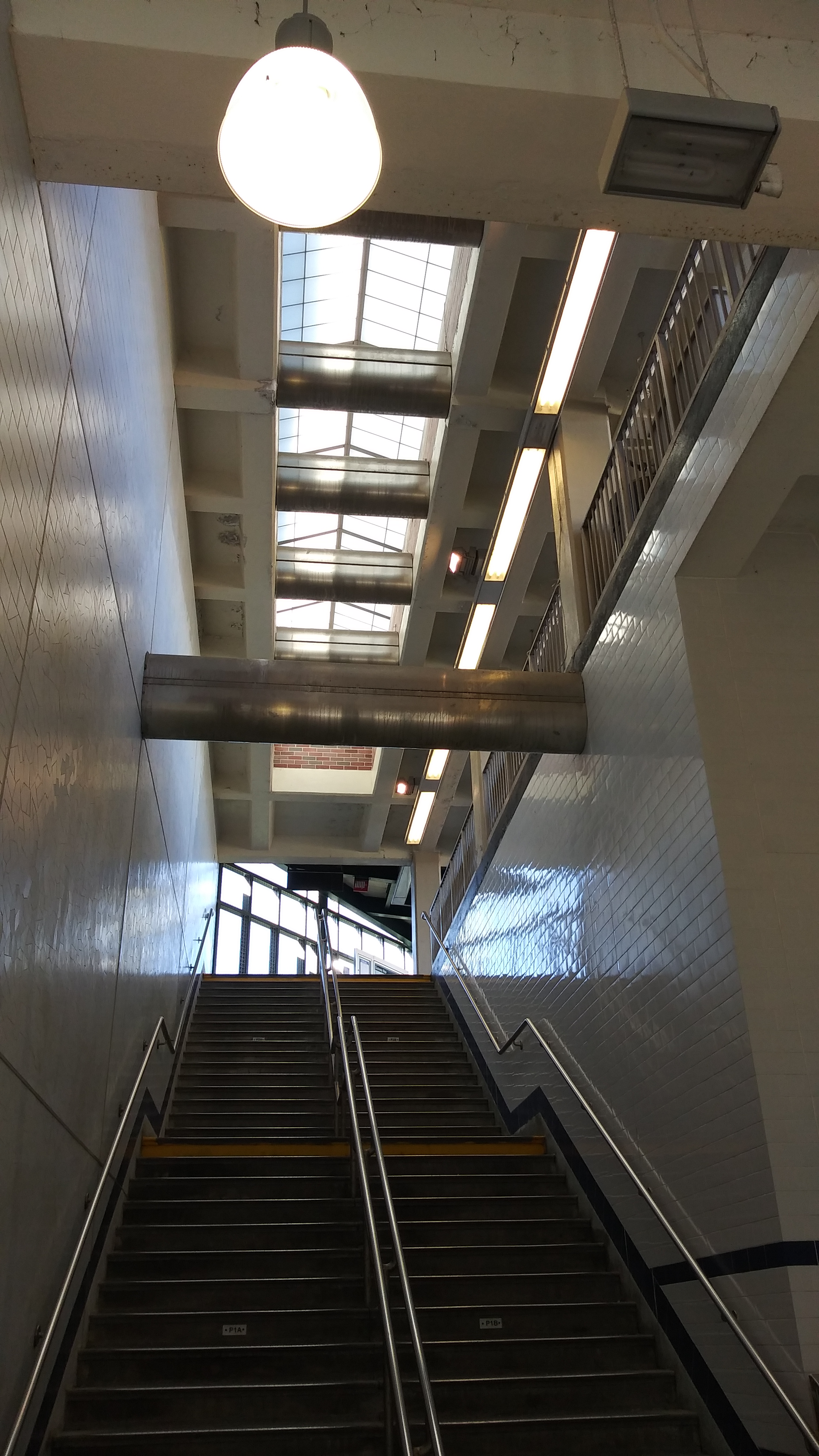
Clerestory over the staircase

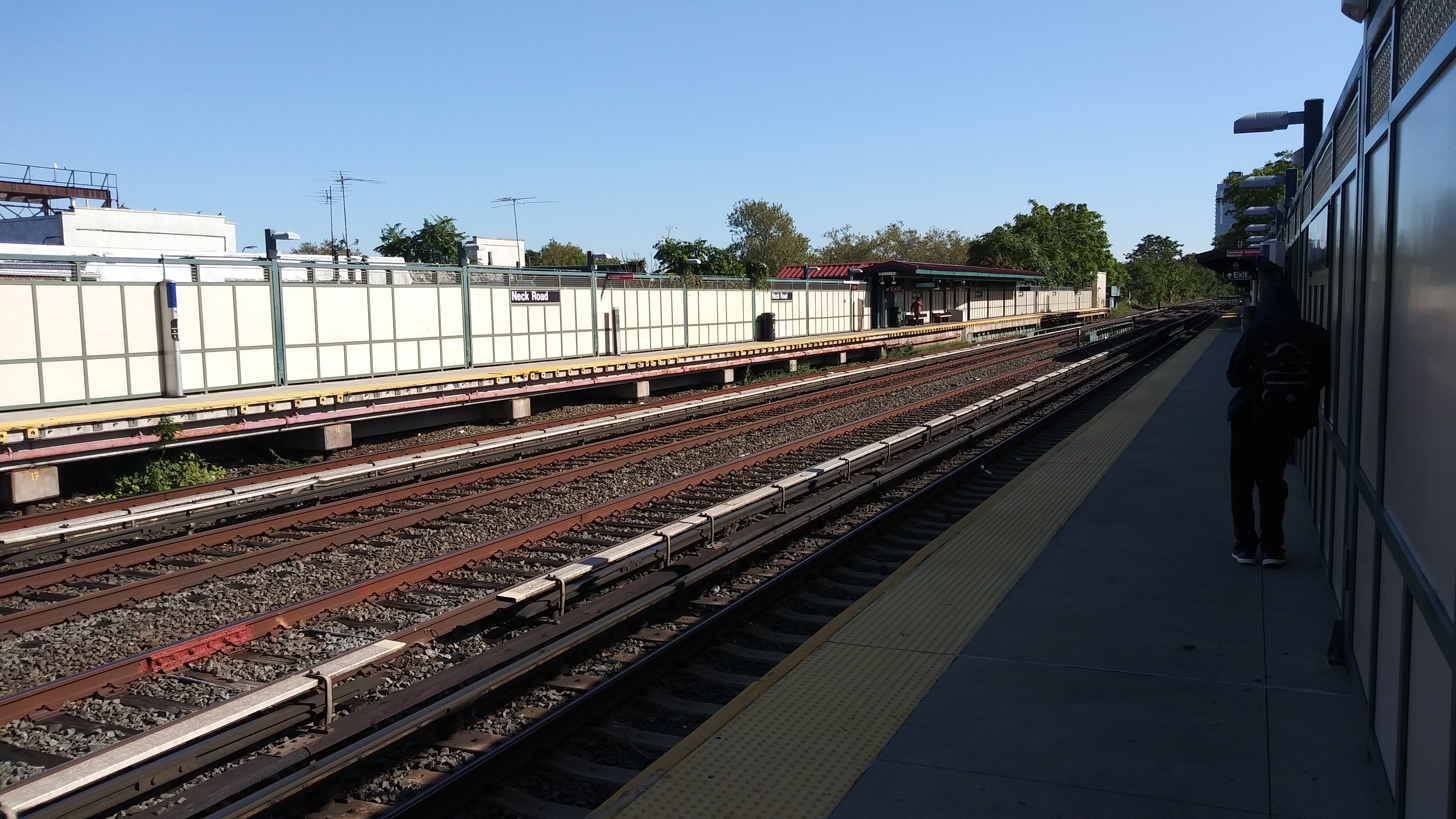
Looking at the northbound platform

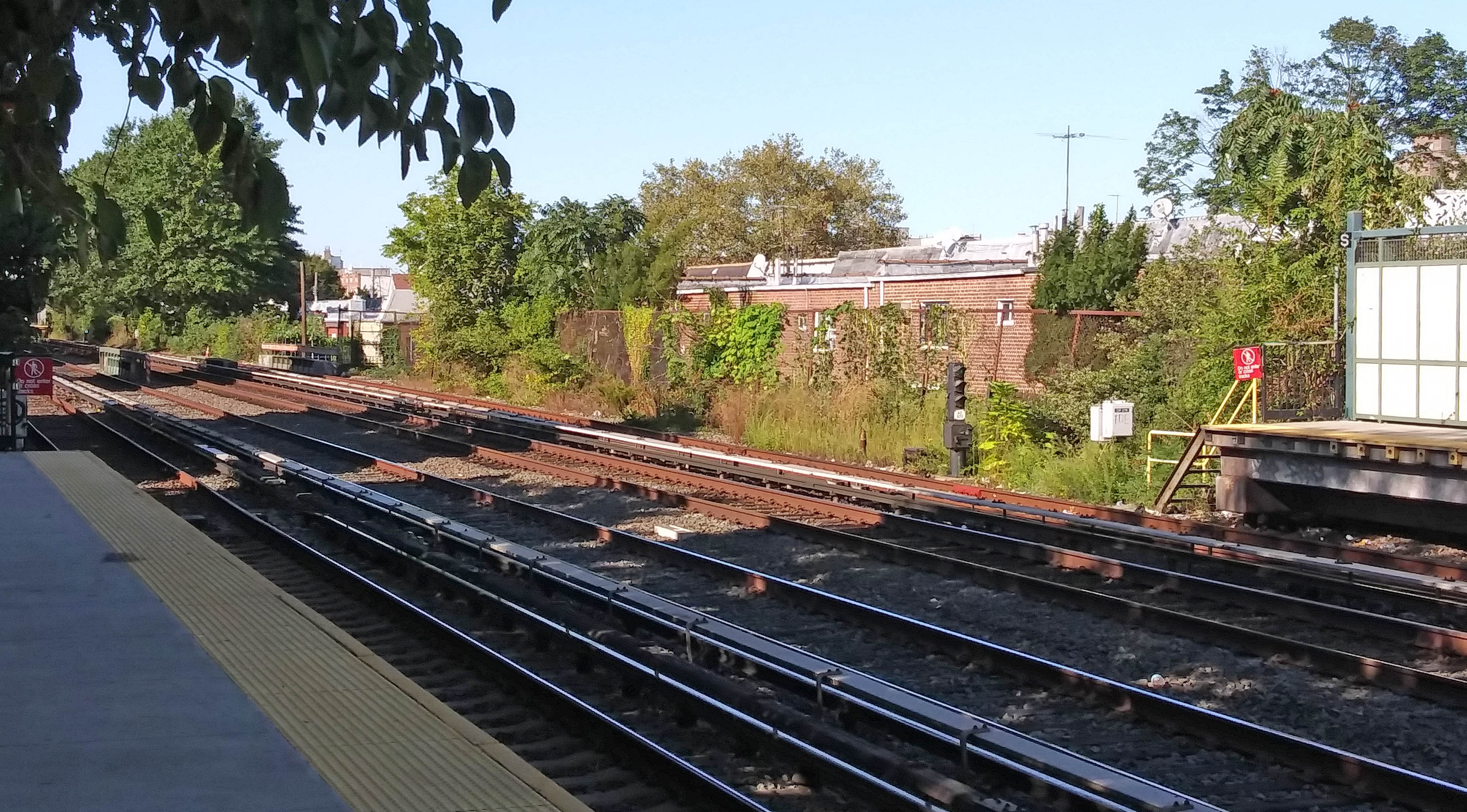
Trackage north of station

== In popular culture ==
This station served as part of the backdrop for a few scenes in the 1993 film A Bronx Tale, starring Robert De Niro and Chazz Palminteri.
