= Ami Sheth =

American actress and model

- Born: New Jersey, United States
- Occupations: Actress, model
- Years active: 2007–present
- Spouse: Miraj Patel

Ami Sheth is an American actress and model best known for starring in the NBC drama Blindspot, the AMC drama Dietland, and the American film Most Beautiful Island. Sheth was included in the 2019 Vogue India list of the Top 50 Most Influential Global Indians.

== Early and personal life ==
Sheth was born to Gujarati Indian immigrant parents and grew up in New Jersey, United States. She graduated from Boston University with a degree in biology and later received her doctorate in veterinary medicine. She later practised at a vet hospital in Staten Island and quit the job to go into acting. While she was in college, she attended acting classes, and since then she has continued to play parts in theatre, film, and television. Riz Ahmed, Mindy Kaling, Priyanka Chopra, and Aasif Mandvi have been her inspirations. She has worked with the Indian filmmaker Ritesh Batra at the Sundance Film Lab in Utah. Sheth is married to Miraj Patel.

== Career ==
She has starred in the Indian-American film Walkaway (2010), a romantic comedy that revolves around four couples living in New York. She has also guest starred in the sitcom Delocated (2010) and Blue Bloods (2011).

In 2017, she starred in Blindspot, appearing in three of its seasons. She played Afreen, an Indian-Muslim FBI lab technician who helps the team decipher the mysterious tattoo case. She has acted in the SXSW Critics Choice Award winning drama film Most Beautiful Island (2017). In 2018, she appeared in the american dark comedy drama Dietland, alongside Julianna Margulies.

== Filmography ==
Year	Title	Role	Notes	Ref
2007	Astoria Park		Short	
2009	Hotel Chelsea	Monica Jain		
2009	Tomorrow	Monica	Short	
2009	Three			
2010	Karma Road			
2010	Delocated	Princess Fairuz	1 episode	
2010	Walkaway	Anu		
2011	Blue Bloods	Farrah	1 episode	
2011	The Eye of Genie Strauss	Melrose	Short	
2011	One Life to Live	Nadia	1 episode	
2016	Bull	Erica Povery	1 episode	
2016	New Wall Street		1 episode	
2017	Most Beautiful Island	Benedita		
2017–2020	Blindspot	Afreen Iqbal	12 episodes, (Seasons 3–5)	
2018	Dietland	Sana	6 episodes	
2018	Anatomy of an Orchid	Radha	Short	
2018	Elementary	Mrs. Holland	1 episode	
2018	Astral	Dr. Sasha Bhatia		
2019	Osiris	Padma Bast	Short	
2020	Swiped to Death	Maya	1 episode	
2022	Asian Persuasion			
