= The Afterlight (2009 film) =

- Directed by: Alexei Kaleina; Craig William Macneill
- Written by: Alexei Kaleina; Craig William Macneill
- Produced by: Alexandre Fuchs; Pegah Easton
- Starring: Michael Kelly; Jicky Schnee; Ana Asensio; Rip Torn; Morgan Taddeo; Rhoda Pauley
- Cinematography: Zoe White
- Edited by: Alexei Kaleina; Craig William Macneill
- Music by: Nathan Matthew David
- Production company: Wintersea Films
- Release date: 2009 (Rome)
- Running time: 87 minutes
- Country: United States
- Language: English

The Afterlight is a 2009 American drama film written and directed by Alexei Kaleina and Craig William Macneill and starring Michael Kelly, Jicky Schnee, Ana Asensio, Rip Torn, Morgan Taddeo and Rhoda Pauley.

== Cast ==
- Michael Kelly as Andrew
- Jicky Schnee as Claire
- Ana Asensio as Maria
- Morgan Taddeo as Lucy
- Rip Torn as Carl
- Rhoda Pauley as Carol

== Release ==
The film premiered at the Rome Film Festival in 2009 and was released at the Quad Cinema on September 10, 2010.

== Reception ==
The film has a 63% percent rating on Rotten Tomatoes based on eight reviews.

Ronnie Scheib of Variety gave the film a positive review and wrote, "Afterlight proceeds without much discernible plot or character development, its objects and places exuding more backstory than its people, though Rip Torn as the father of the sole male protagonist lends a certain woodsy authenticity."

Jeannette Catsoulis of The New York Times also gave the film a positive review and wrote, “ Tempering the film’s oppressive emotions, the cinematographer Zoë White’s exquisite compositions charge leaden rain clouds and rustling branches with eerie life, and dusty indoor corners with shadowy secrets.”

Gary Goldstein of the Los Angeles Times gave the film a negative review and wrote, “ At the same time, it’s hard to embrace this glacially paced, symbolism-heavy film’s elusive — when it’s not being elliptical — story about a city couple’s escape to rural life.”
