= Glengarry Glen Ross =

1983 play written by David Mamet

- Original language: English
- Written by: David Mamet
- Characters: Richard Roma; Shelly Levene; James Lingk; John Williamson; George Aaronow; Dave Moss; Baylen
- Genre: Tragedy
- Setting: Chicago, Illinois, U.S.

Premiere
- Date: September 21, 1983
- Place: National Theatre, London

Glengarry Glen Ross is a 1983 stage play written by the American playwright David Mamet. It is a two-act tragedy that depicts two days in the lives of four desperate Chicago real estate agents who are prepared to engage in any number of unethical, illegal acts—from lies and flattery to bribery, threats, intimidation, and burglary—to sell real estate to unwitting prospective buyers.

Glengarry Glen Ross explores themes of capitalism, morality, and masculinity. The play's title comes from the two real estate developments frequently mentioned by the characters: Glengarry Highlands and Glen Ross Farms. The former is the prime real estate that all of the agents are trying to sell, while the latter was very lucrative for those who sold it several years ago. Glengarry Glen Ross premiered at the Cottesloe Theatre, the smallest house of London's National Theatre, on September 21, 1983. The production was directed by Bill Bryden and was acclaimed as a triumph of ensemble acting.

Glengarry Glen Ross debuted on Broadway on March 25, 1984, at the John Golden Theatre, and closed on February 17, 1985, after 378 performances. Among its four nominations at the 38th Tony Awards, including Best Play and Best Director for Gregory Mosher, Joe Mantegna was named Best Featured Actor in a Play for his portrayal of the top salesman, Richard Roma. Mamet won the Pulitzer Prize for Drama that same year. A film adaptation, directed by James Foley and featuring an extended screenplay by Mamet, was released in 1992 to critical acclaim.

Since its premiere, Glengarry Glen Ross has been revived on Broadway three times, under the direction of Joe Mantello, Daniel J. Sullivan, and Patrick Marber. Mantello's production, led by Liev Schreiber as Roma, won the Tony Award for Best Revival of a Play in 2005. Sullivan and Marber's adaptations received less favourable reviews from critics.

== Characters ==
Characters	National Theatre	Broadway	Broadway Revival	Broadway Revival	Broadway Revival
Characters	1983	1984	2005	2012	2025
Richard Roma	Jack Shepherd	Joe Mantegna	Liev Schreiber	Bobby Cannavale	Kieran Culkin
Shelly Levene	Derek Newark	Robert Prosky	Alan Alda	Al Pacino	Bob Odenkirk
James Lingk	Tony Haygarth	Lane Smith	Tom Wopat	Jeremy Shamos	John Pirruccello
John Williamson	Karl Johnson	J.T. Walsh	Frederick Weller	David Harbour	Donald Webber Jr.
George Aaronow	James Grant	Mike Nussbaum	Jeffrey Tambor	Richard Schiff	Michael McKean
Dave Moss	Trevor Ray	James Tolkan	Gordon Clapp	John C. McGinley	Bill Burr
Detective Baylen	John Tams	Jack Wallace	Jordan Lange	Murphy Guyer	Howard W. Overshown

- Richard "Ricky" Roma: The most successful salesman in the office. He is ruthless, dishonest, and immoral, and succeeds because he has a talent for figuring out a client's weaknesses and crafting a pitch that will exploit those weaknesses. He is a smooth talker and tends to maneuver clients towards a sale by means of grand but vaguely incoherent soliloquies.
- Shelly "The Machine" Levene: An older, once-successful salesman, who has fallen on hard times and has not closed a big deal in a long time. In Mamet's original 1983 stage version, Levene alludes to his daughter's plight in a failed attempt to gain Williamson's sympathy. The 1992 film version expands upon this, showing Levene is unable to pay for his daughter's expensive medical care, giving him an additional reason for his desperation. NOTE: Published versions of the play spell the character's name "Shelly", but the movie and the 2025 revival on Broadway spell the name "Shelley".
- Dave Moss: A big-mouthed salesman who seeks an accomplice to help him rob the office. Moss resents Williamson and agency owners Mitch and Murray and plans to steal all their best sales leads and sell them to a competitor. During his final rant against Roma, his indignation reveals that his jealousy extends towards even his fellow salesmen.
- George Aaronow: An aging salesman with low self-esteem who, lacking hope and confidence, is not without conscience. His frustration begins to boil up when the office is robbed, and he worries about Detective Baylen's accusations and insinuations.
- John Williamson: The office manager. Williamson distributes the daily sales leads and tracks paperwork and is the only person in the office who interacts with the owners. The salesmen all despise him because of his loyalty to the company and his managerial power over them.
- James Lingk: A timid, middle-aged man who becomes Roma's latest client. Lingk is easily manipulated and finds Roma highly charismatic. After consulting his wife, he becomes desperate to regain the money that Roma has convinced him to commit to a land deal.
- Baylen: A police detective investigating the office break-in, he harshly interrogates the salesmen behind closed doors.
- Mitch and Murray: The unsavory unseen characters who are the owners of the real estate agency. Their "sales contest" puts enormous pressure on the salesmen to produce or lose their jobs; only the top two men will receive prizes, while the rest will be fired.

== Synopsis ==
=== Act I ===
Setting: a Chinese restaurant

Scene 1: Shelly Levene tries to convince office manager John Williamson to give him some of "the Glengarry leads" (names and phone numbers of promising potential clients for expensive properties). Williamson is willing to sell some of the prime leads, but demands cash in advance. Levene cannot come up with the cash and must leave without any good leads to work with.

Scene 2: Dave Moss and George Aaronow hate the pressure management has put on them to succeed. Moss tells Aaronow that they need to strike back by stealing all the Glengarry leads and selling them to another real estate agency. Moss's plan would require Aaronow to break into the office, stage a burglary, and steal all the prime leads. Aaronow wants no part of the plan, but Moss intimidates him, claiming that he is already an accomplice simply by listening to Moss's pitch.

Scene 3: Ricky Roma delivers a monologue to James Lingk. Roma does not bring up the real estate he wants to sell to Lingk until the very end. Instead, Roma preys upon Lingk's insecurities, and his sense that he has never done anything adventurous with his life.

=== Act II ===
Setting: a real estate sales office

The burglary is discovered. Williamson has summoned a police detective. Shelly Levene is happy, because he has finally sold a large plot of land to a couple named Nyborg. James Lingk enters the office, looking for Ricky Roma. Lingk's wife has ordered him to cancel the sales contract he signed with Roma. Roma attempts to smooth-talk Lingk into not canceling the contract, informing Lingk that his check has not yet been brought to the bank; this begins to have its intended calming effect on Lingk, who is clearly agitated. Levene supports the ruse, but Williamson, thinking Lingk is worried about the safety of his check, accidentally ruins Roma's ploy when he tells Lingk that his check has just been deposited. Lingk abruptly leaves, telling Roma he's sorry for letting him down.

Roma is furious at Williamson, who has blown a big sale. Levene picks up where Roma left off, and begins insulting Williamson. Mid-rant, Levene accidentally reveals his knowledge that Williamson made up the claim about the check being cashed, information he could not have known unless he had been in Williamson's office. Williamson accuses Levene of robbing the office. Levene quickly folds and admits that he and Dave Moss were the thieves. Levene tries to bribe Williamson, offering half of his future sales. Williamson reveals that the Nyborg sale is worthless, as the couple is elderly, mentally ill, and just like talking to salesmen because they're so lonely. Levene asks why Williamson wants him turned in, and why he wouldn't give him the leads in the first place. Williamson simply states he doesn't like Levene, for the years of verbal abuse, and the old man's flippant nature. Roma comes back from his interrogation and Williamson goes in the back room to speak with the detective. Alone with a devastated Levene, Roma proposes the two men work together. The door opens and the detective demands to speak with Levene, shoving him into the back room.

Roma, unaware of Levene's fate, reveals his true intentions behind the partnership. Roma orders Williamson to not only continue to hand him the best leads, but to add half of Levene's commissions. Williamson tells Roma not to worry about it but Roma won't listen. (This exchange is omitted in both the published play script and film adaptation.) Aaronow enters the office, desperate to know if they found the perpetrators. Roma says no and heads out to the restaurant.

== Controversy ==
There was controversy over lines in the play, and in the film adaptation of it, in which it was claimed prejudice was shown against Indian Americans. As a result, Mamet removed the language from a 2004 San Francisco revival. The controversial dialogue is included in the film version in two conversations about leads named Patel, although one of the play's crudest remarks is omitted.

== Productions ==
=== Original 1983 London premiere ===
The world premiere of Glengarry Glen Ross was at the Cottesloe Theatre of the Royal National Theatre in London on September 21, 1983, directed by Bill Bryden.

==== Cast ====
- Derek Newark – Shelly Levene
- Karl Johnson – John Williamson
- Trevor Ray – Dave Moss
- James Grant – George Aaronow
- Jack Shepherd – Richard Roma
- Tony Haygarth – James Lingk
- John Tams – Baylen

=== 1984 Chicago and Broadway production ===
Glengarry Glen Ross had its U.S. premiere on February 6, 1984, at the Goodman Theatre of the Art Institute of Chicago before moving to Broadway on March 25, 1984, at the John Golden Theatre and running for 378 shows.

==== Cast ====
- Robert Prosky – Shelly Levene
- J. T. Walsh – John Williamson
- James Tolkan – Dave Moss
- Mike Nussbaum – George Aaronow
- Joe Mantegna – Richard Roma
- William L. Petersen – James Lingk (Chicago)
- Lane Smith – James Lingk (Broadway)
- Jack Wallace – Baylen

=== 2000 New Jersey production ===
On February 18, 2000, the first major regional revival opened at the McCarter Theater in Princeton, New Jersey, starring Charles Durning as Levene and Ruben Santiago-Hudson as Roma.

=== 2005 Broadway production ===
Glengarry Glen Ross was revived on Broadway for the first time on May 1, 2005, at the Bernard B. Jacobs Theatre, under the direction of Joe Mantello. Met with critical acclaim, it received seven nominations at the 59th Tony Awards, winning Best Revival of a Play and Best Featured Actor in a Play for Liev Schreiber, who starred as Roma.

==== Cast ====
- Alan Alda – Shelly Levene
- Frederick Weller – John Williamson
- Gordon Clapp – Dave Moss
- Jeffrey Tambor – George Aaronow
- Liev Schreiber – Richard Roma
- Tom Wopat – James Link
- Jordan Lage – Baylen

=== 2007 West End production ===
Glengarry Glen Ross has also been produced as a radio play for BBC Radio 3, featuring Héctor Elizondo, Stacy Keach, Bruce Davison, and Alfred Molina as Roma, first airing on March 20, 2005. On September 27, 2007, the play was revived at the Apollo Theatre in London, under the direction of James Macdonald.

==== Cast ====
- Jonathan Pryce – Shelly Levene
- Peter McDonald – James Williamson
- Matthew Marsh – Dave Moss
- Paul Freeman – George Aaronow
- Aidan Gillen – Richard Roma

=== 2012 Broadway production ===
A second Broadway revival opened on December 8, 2012. It was a subject of media scrutiny for its "unusually long" preview period. The production was originally scheduled to begin previews on October 16, 2012, but it was delayed to October 19 due to headliner Al Pacino's prior commitments in Los Angeles and Chicago for the film Stand Up Guys. Its opening night was pushed back from its original date of 11 November, citing canceled rehearsals due to Hurricane Sandy. Sullivan's revival received mixed reviews from critics; much of the criticism was aimed at Pacino's portrayal of Levene, but Bobby Cannavale's performance as Roma was better received. Pacino previously played Roma in the 1992 film.

==== Cast ====
- Al Pacino – Shelly Levene
- David Harbour – John Williamson
- John C. McGinley – Dave Moss
- Richard Schiff – George Aaronow
- Bobby Cannavale – Richard Roma
- Jeremy Shamos – James Lingk
- Murphy Guyer – Baylen

=== 2016 Brighton production ===
Pretty Villain Productions performed at Rialto Theatre as part of Brighton Fringe in May 2016, winning an award and favourable reviews. It featured John Tolputt as Levene, Steve Chusak as Roma, and Duncan Henderson as Williamson.

=== 2017 West End production ===
On October 26, 2017, a revival in London's West End directed by Sam Yates opened at the Playhouse Theatre, running for 14 weeks. From February 2019, the production toured the United Kingdom starring Mark Benton as Levene and Nigel Harman as Roma.

==== Cast ====
- Stanley Townsend – Shelly Levene
- Kris Marshall – John Williamson
- Robert Glenister – Dave Moss
- Don Warrington – George Aaronow
- Christian Slater – Richard Roma
- Daniel Ryan – James Lingk
- Oliver Ryan – Baylen

=== 2025 Broadway production ===
A third Broadway revival began previews on March 10, 2025, at the Palace Theatre. It opened on March 31 and concluded on June 28. The limited engagement was headlined by Kieran Culkin as Roma, Bob Odenkirk as Levene, and Bill Burr as Moss; Michael McKean was later cast as Aaronow. Glengarry Glen Ross served as Odenkirk's and Burr's Broadway debuts. The production featured Monday performances and did not play on Sundays to accommodate Culkin's family time. Marber's revival received polarizing reviews from critics, who generally praised the performances of Burr and Odenkirk but found Culkin to be miscast.

==== Cast ====
- Bob Odenkirk – Shelly Levene
- Donald Webber Jr. – John Williamson
- Bill Burr – Dave Moss
- Michael McKean – George Aaronow
- Kieran Culkin – Richard Roma
- John Pirruccello – James Lingk
- Howard W. Overshown – Baylen

=== 2026 London production ===
A new London revival directed by Patrick Marber is scheduled to open at The Old Vic in June 2026. It will feature an all-female cast.

==== Cast ====
- Indira Varma – Levene
- Dorothea Myer-Bennett – Williamson
- Niki Wardley – Moss
- Nancy Crane – Aaronow
- Rosa Salazar – Roma
- Mercedes Bahleda – Lingk
- Florence Odumosu - Baylen

== Film adaptation ==
The film was released using an expanded script featuring a role specifically written for Alec Baldwin. His character does not appear in the play; he simply gives his name as "Fuck You" in the film, although the end credits refer to him as "Blake".

- Jack Lemmon as Shelly Levene
- Kevin Spacey as John Williamson
- Ed Harris as Dave Moss
- Alan Arkin as George Aaronow
- Al Pacino as Richard Roma
- Jonathan Pryce as James Lingk
- Jude Ciccolella as Baylen
- Alec Baldwin as Blake

== Awards and nominations ==
=== Original Broadway production ===
Year	Award	Category	Nominee	Result
1984	Tony Award	Best Play	Elliot Martin, David Mamet, Arnold Bernhard, The Goodman Theatre & The Shubert Organization	Nominated
1984	Tony Award	Best Featured Actor in a Play	Joe Mantegna	Won
1984	Tony Award	Best Featured Actor in a Play	Robert Prosky	Nominated
1984	Tony Award	Best Direction of a Play	Gregory Mosher	Nominated
1984	Drama Desk Award	Outstanding New Play		Nominated
1984	Drama Desk Award	Outstanding Ensemble Performance	Joe Mantegna	Won
1984	Drama Desk Award	Outstanding Director of a Play	Gregory Mosher	Nominated
1984	New York Drama Critics' Circle	Best American Play	David Mamet	Won
1984	Pulitzer Prize	Drama	David Mamet	Won

=== 2005 Broadway revival ===
Year	Award	Category	Nominee	Result
2005	Tony Award	Best Revival of a Play		Won
2005	Tony Award	Best Featured Actor in a Play	Liev Schreiber	Won
2005	Tony Award	Best Featured Actor in a Play	Alan Alda	Nominated
2005	Tony Award	Best Featured Actor in a Play	Gordon Clapp	Nominated
2005	Tony Award	Best Direction of a Play	Joe Mantello	Nominated
2005	Tony Award	Best Scenic Design of a Play	Santo Loquasto	Nominated
2005	Drama Desk Award	Outstanding Revival of a Play		Nominated
2005	Drama Desk Award	Outstanding Ensemble Performance	Alan Alda, Jeffrey Tambor, Tom Wopat, Frederick Weller, Gordon Clapp, Liev Schreiber & Jordan Lage	Won
2005	Drama Desk Award	Outstanding Director of a Play	Joe Mantello	Nominated
2005	Drama Desk Award	Outstanding Set Design for a Play	Santo Loquasto	Won
2005	Outer Critics Circle Award	Outstanding Revival of a Play		Nominated
2005	Outer Critics Circle Award	Outstanding Actor in a Play	Alan Alda	Nominated
2005	Outer Critics Circle Award	Outstanding Director of a Play	Joe Mantello	Nominated
2005	Drama League Award	Distinguished Revival of a Play		Nominated
2005	Theatre World Award		Gordon Clapp	Won

=== 2025 Broadway revival ===
Year	Award	Category	Nominee	Result
2025	Tony Awards	Best Featured Actor in a Play	Bob Odenkirk	Nominated
2025	Drama League Awards	Outstanding Revival of a Play		Nominated
2025	Drama League Awards	Distinguished Performance	Kieran Culkin	Nominated
2025	Outer Critics Circle Awards	Outstanding Revival of a Play		Nominated
2025	Outer Critics Circle Awards	Outstanding Featured Performer in a Broadway Play	Kieran Culkin	Nominated
