= List of awards and nominations received by Liev Schreiber =

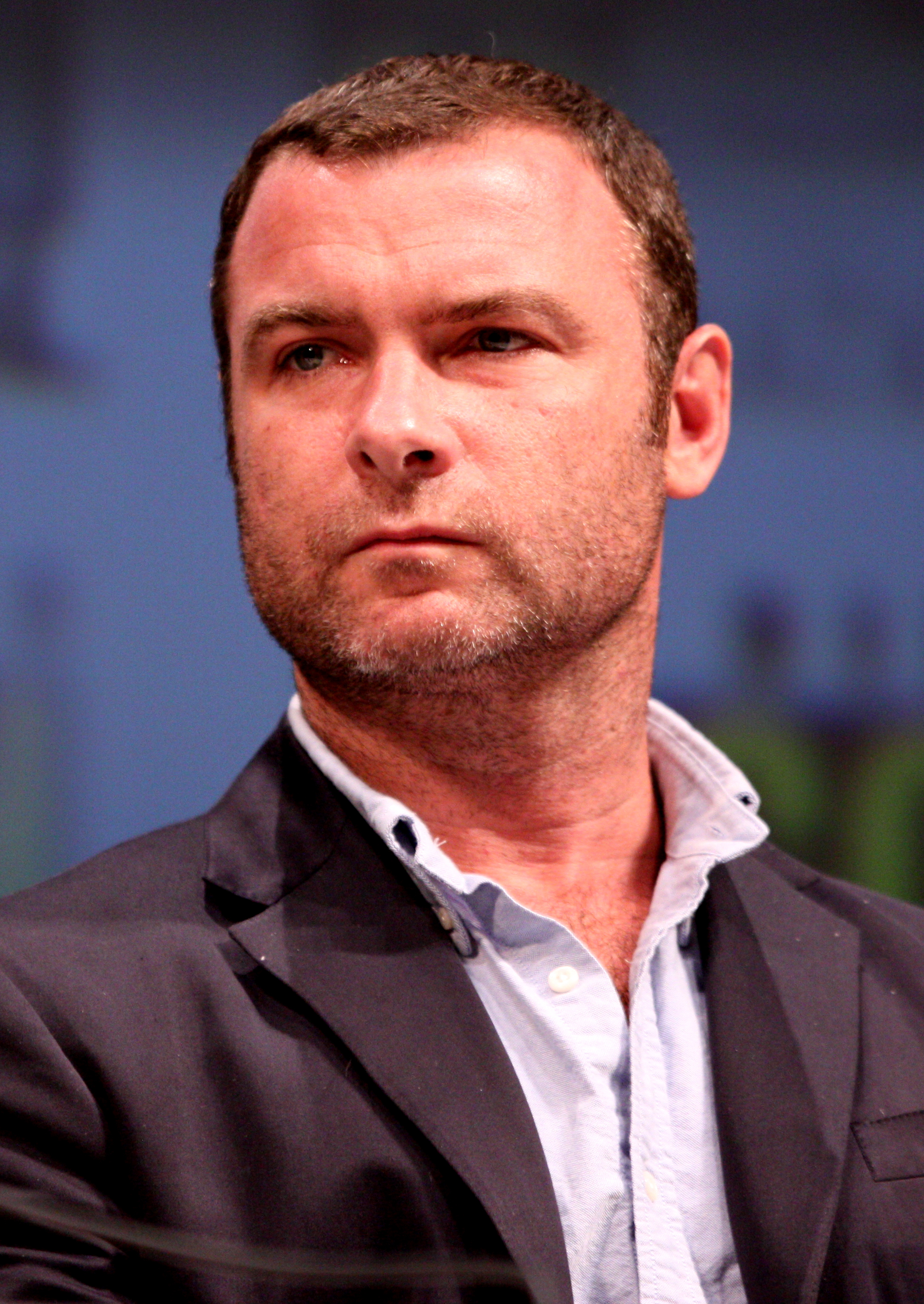
Schreiber at ComicCon in 2010

American actor Liev Schreiber has received numerous accolades, including a Tony Award, two Drama Desk Awards, and a Screen Actors Guild Award as well as nominations for nine Primetime Emmy Awards and six Golden Globe Awards.

Schreiber gained acclaim for portraying filmmaker Orson Welles in the HBO television film RKO 281 (1998) for which he was nominated for the Primetime Emmy Award and Golden Globe Award for Best Actor in a Limited Series or Movie. For his title role as a fixer in the HBO drama series Ray Donovan (2013–2020) he was nominated for three Primetime Emmy Awards for Outstanding Lead Actor in a Drama Series, five Golden Globe Awards for Best Actor in a Television Series – Drama, and two Critics' Choice Television Awards for Best Actor in a Drama Series.

For his work on the Broadway stage, he received a Tony Award for Best Featured Actor in a Play for playing Richard Roma in the David Mamet revival Glengarry Glenn Ross (2005). He was Tony-nominated for his roles as a shock jock in the Eric Bogosian play Talk Radio (2007), a conflicted longshoreman in the Arthur Miller revival A View from the Bridge (2010) and a personable priest in the John Patrick Shanley revival Doubt (2024).

== Major associations ==
=== Emmy Awards ===
Primetime Emmy Awards
Year	Category	Nominated work	Result	Ref.
2000	Outstanding Lead Actor in a Miniseries or a Movie	RKO 281	Nominated	
2015	Outstanding Lead Actor in a Drama Series	Ray Donovan (episode: "Walk This Way")	Nominated	
2016	Outstanding Lead Actor in a Drama Series	Ray Donovan (episode: "Exsuscito")	Nominated	
2017	Outstanding Lead Actor in a Drama Series	Ray Donovan (episode: "Rattus Rattus")	Nominated	
2017	Outstanding Narrator	Muhammad Ali: Only One	Nominated	
2017	Outstanding Narrator	UConn: The March To Madness	Nominated	
2018	Outstanding Narrator	24/7	Nominated	
2019	Outstanding Narrator	The Many Lives of Nick Buoniconti	Nominated	
2022	Outstanding Television Movie	Ray Donovan: The Movie (as executive producer)	Nominated	

=== Golden Globe Awards ===
Year	Category	Nominated work	Result	Ref.
1999	Best Actor – Miniseries or Television Film	RKO 281	Nominated	
2013	Best Actor in a Television Series – Drama	Ray Donovan (season 1)	Nominated	
2014	Best Actor in a Television Series – Drama	Ray Donovan (season 2)	Nominated	
2015	Best Actor in a Television Series – Drama	Ray Donovan (season 3)	Nominated	
2016	Best Actor in a Television Series – Drama	Ray Donovan (season 4)	Nominated	
2017	Best Actor in a Television Series – Drama	Ray Donovan (season 5)	Nominated	

=== Screen Actors Guild Awards ===
Year	Category	Nominated work	Result	Ref.
2013	Outstanding Cast in a Motion Picture	The Butler	Nominated	
2015	Outstanding Cast in a Motion Picture	Spotlight	Won	

=== Tony Awards ===
Year	Category	Nominated work	Result	Ref.
2005	Best Featured Actor in a Play	Glengarry Glen Ross	Won	
2007	Best Actor in a Play	Talk Radio	Nominated	
2010	Best Actor in a Play	A View from the Bridge	Nominated	
2024	Best Actor in a Play	Doubt	Nominated	

== Miscellaneous awards ==
=== Astra TV Awards ===
Year	Category	Nominated work	Result	Ref.
2024	Best Supporting Actor in a Limited or Anthology Series	A Small Light	Won	

=== Critics' Choice Awards ===
Year	Category	Nominated work	Result	Ref.
2016	Best Actor in a Drama Series	Ray Donovan	Nominated	
2017	Best Actor in a Drama Series	Ray Donovan	Nominated	
2024	Best Supporting Actor in a Movie/Miniseries	A Small Light	Nominated	
2025	Best Supporting Actor in a Movie/Miniseries	The Perfect Couple	Won	

=== Drama Desk Awards ===
Year	Category	Nominated work	Result	Ref.
2001	Outstanding Actor in a Play	Betrayal	Nominated	
2005	Outstanding Actor in a Play	Glengarry Glen Ross	Won	
2007	Outstanding Actor in a Play	Talk Radio	Nominated	
2010	Outstanding Actor in a Play	A View from the Bridge	Won	

=== Detroit Film Critics Society ===
Year	Category	Nominated work	Result	Ref.
2015	Best Supporting Actor	Spotlight	Won	

=== Gotham Independent Film Awards ===
Year	Category	Nominated work	Result	Ref.
2015	Ensemble Performance	Spotlight	Won	

=== Independent Spirit Awards ===
Year	Category	Nominated work	Result	Ref.
2015	Robert Altman Award	Spotlight	Won	

=== Satellite Awards ===
Year	Category	Nominated work	Result	Ref.
2015	Best Cast in a Motion Picture	Spotlight	Won	

=== Saturn Awards ===
Year	Category	Nominated work	Result	Ref.
2005	Best Supporting Actor	The Manchurian Candidate	Nominated	
