= List of Ray Donovan episodes =

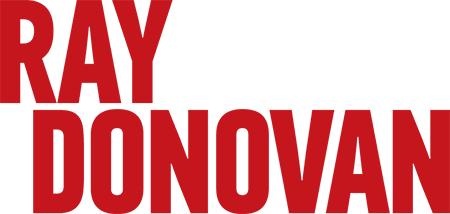

Ray Donovan is an American crime drama television series created by Ann Biderman, which premiered on Showtime on June 30, 2013. Liev Schreiber stars as the titular character, a "fixer" for the powerful law firm Goldman & Drexler, representing the rich and famous of Los Angeles, California. Ray experiences his own problems when his father, Mickey Donovan (Jon Voight), is unexpectedly released from prison.

On February 4, 2020, Showtime cancelled the series after seven seasons. However, on February 24, 2021, the network announced a feature-length film to conclude the storyline, that premiered on January 14, 2022.

During the course of the series, 82 episodes of Ray Donovan aired over seven seasons, between June 30, 2013, and January 19, 2020. A sequel finale film, Ray Donovan: The Movie, aired on January 14, 2022.

== Series overview ==
Season	Episodes	Originally released	
Season	Episodes	First released	Last released
1	12	June 30, 2013	September 22, 2013
2	12	July 13, 2014	September 28, 2014
3	12	July 12, 2015	September 27, 2015
4	12	June 26, 2016	September 18, 2016
5	12	August 6, 2017	October 29, 2017
6	12	October 28, 2018	January 13, 2019
7	10	November 17, 2019	January 19, 2020

== Episodes ==
=== Season 1 (2013) ===
No. overall	No. in season	Title	Directed by	Written by	Original release date	U.S. viewers (millions)
1	1	"The Bag or the Bat"	Allen Coulter	Ann Biderman	June 30, 2013	1.35
Ray Donovan fixes problems for a powerful Los Angeles law firm. Originally from South Boston, he now lives in the affluent city of Calabasas, California. While dealing with his troubled family, including his wife Abby, daughter Bridget and son Conor, he learns of the return of his father, Mickey, released early from prison on parole. Before meeting with his family, however, Mickey decides to go take care of the priest that abused his son, Ray's brother. On the client side, one of Ray’s clients wakes up next to a dead woman. They never had sex and he didn’t kill her; she died from a drug overdose. That same morning, another one of his clients, actor Tommy Wheeler, with a movie about to be released, calls him to tell him that he’s being blackmailed with a sex video. Ray realizes he can kill two birds with one stone.
2	2	"A Mouth Is a Mouth"	Allen Coulter	Ann Biderman	July 7, 2013	1.56
Ray hates his father Mickey for his past transgressions and tries to send him back to prison. Angry with Ray, Abby allows their kids to spend the day with Mickey, and they fall in love with their naughty grandfather. Ray handles two crises involving movie star clients: A-list actor Sean Walker receives a threatening message and a home invasion, while action hero Tommy Wheeler is blackmailed with a video of his sexual exploits with a trans woman. Ray wires himself up and talks to the blackmailer about what she wants exactly; then he goes to her home and dramatically ends her plans. But soon after, in an act of compassion, he has delivered to her enough money (gotten from his lawyer) for the operation she craves - surreptitiously keeping a stash for himself.
3	3	"Twerk"	Greg Yaitanes	Ron Nyswaner	July 14, 2013	1.45
Mickey spends time with his sons. Ray "buys" a talented hip-hop artist, Marvin Gaye Washington, for his rapper neighbor. Bridget becomes friendly with Marvin. Ezra holds a fundraiser in honor of his late wife, due to being haunted by past mistakes. Meanwhile, the real reason for Mickey's early parole, that he’s informing on Ray and Ezra for the FBI, is revealed.
4	4	"Black Cadillac"	John Dahl	David Hollander	July 21, 2013	1.52
Ray is forced by Abby to visit Bel Air Academy, a potential new school for Bridget, while he tries to deal with a work situation. Meanwhile, Mickey meets his ex, Claudette, leading to old memories being relived.
5	5	"The Golem"	Dan Attias	Sean Conway	July 28, 2013	1.46
Bunchy, who had been abused by a Catholic priest when he was a boy, receives his money from the settlement with the Church. Mickey and Ezra reminisce about old events while Mickey wears a wire. Ezra has an accident while driving at night and believes he has killed someone. Terry and Frances' relationship grows stronger.
6	6	"Housewarming"	Michael Uppendahl	Brett Johnson	August 4, 2013	1.45
Ray tries to shut down Van Miller's investigation by drugging him and creating an incriminating video. Bunchy throws a housewarming party, but it gets out of control. Ray finds out that Mickey put his kids in danger and retaliates. Ray has to rescue one of his clients, a famous NBA player, from a spermjacking scam.
7	7	"New Birthday"	Lesli Linka Glatter	David Hollander	August 11, 2013	1.44
Ray finds out about Bridget's relationship with Marvin and forbids her from seeing him, but she visits him anyway, leading to emotional upset. Meanwhile, Ray flies to Boston to search for Sully, a mobster there. Abby and Deb enjoy themselves too much while shopping, end up shoplifting, and get arrested. Mickey makes Sean let him work on a movie project.
8	8	"Bridget"	Guy Ferland	Ann Biderman	August 18, 2013	1.47
The three Donovan brothers remember the anniversary of their sister's demise. Ray and Avi get the money back that Bunchy spent on his house. Terry goes after Frances' husband after he sees evidence she has been abused. Mickey has trouble relating to an actress he meets at the spa.
9	9	"Road Trip"	Jeremy Podeswa	Brett Johnson	August 25, 2013	1.33
Accepting Ray's offer to kill Mickey, Sully travels to Los Angeles, but the journey does not go as planned, forcing Avi to step in. Asked by Conor to attend an award show with Tommy Wheeler, Ray must first obtain a series of incriminating photographs of the actor; Miller steps up his efforts in his investigation.
10	10	"Fite Nite"	Tucker Gates	Sean Conway	September 8, 2013	1.25
The Donovans attend Daryll's fight at Terry's club. Meanwhile, Ray's deal with Sully is put into action. Mickey has a rendezvous. Bunchy encounters his abuser, sending him into a tailspin.
11	11	"Bucky Fuckin' Dent"	Dan Minahan	Ron Nyswaner	September 15, 2013	1.41
Horrible secrets are revealed when the Donovan boys encounter the priest who abused Bunchy and Ray when they were boys. Ray executes him. Ray sends Avi to protect his family, much to Abby's anger; Mickey asks a favor from Claudette when he finds himself under investigation for the murder of Sean Walker.
12	12	"Same Exactly"	Michael Apted	Ann Biderman	September 22, 2013	1.41
With Sully on the run, Ray suggests to Frank a bold strategy for finding him; Abby leaves Ray a heartfelt message; Lena convinces Bridget to forgive her father; an empowered Bunchy kicks Mickey out of his apartment; Terry feels guilty about his role in the priest's death; a final showdown at the docks has long-lasting effects.

=== Season 2 (2014) ===
No. overall	No. in season	Title	Directed by	Written by	Original release date	U.S. viewers (millions)
13	1	"Yo Soy Capitán"	Tucker Gates	Ann Biderman	July 13, 2014	1.22
Ray's life returns to normal. The FBI demands that Mickey be brought to them. Abby, concerned for their marriage, forces Ray into therapy with her. Meanwhile, Bunchy attempts to recover from his abuse and applies for a job, Terry obsesses over Frances, and Conor is in trouble after assaulting a classmate.
14	2	"Uber Ray"	Michael Uppendahl	Ann Biderman & David Hollander	July 20, 2014	1.27
Having difficulty controlling Mickey after returning him to LA, Ray bribes corrupt parole officer Ronald Keith to keep an eye on his father. As Ed Cochran holds a press conference declaring the FBI has caught Sully, Boston Globe reporter Kate McPherson launches her own investigation into what happened at the docks.
15	3	"Gem and Loan"	Phil Abraham	Michael Tolkin	July 27, 2014	1.38
Desperate to get Bridget into the prestigious Bel-Air Academy, Ray is forced to do an unusual favor for old rival Stu Feldman, which involves a married couple; Mickey's attempts to see his old lover are thwarted by Keith; Kate arrives at Terry's Fight Club looking for answers; Abby's therapist tries to convince her that Ray is bribing her. Marvin reenters Bridget's life.
16	4	"S U C K"	Tucker Gates	David Hollander	August 3, 2014	1.45
Ray and the FBI must deal with Tiny, Sully's nephew who spoke to the cops about his involvement in Sully's death. After sleeping with Kate, Ray purchases a new house for Abby, who befriends a police officer at a shooting range. Bunchy makes friends with a woman and her child at his new job; Kate attempts to talk to Mickey.
17	5	"Irish Spring"	Dan Attias	Ron Nyswaner	August 10, 2014	1.42
Ray gets compromising information on Cochran, who enjoys wife-swapping with one of his subordinates. Avi follows Kate as she investigates, but Ray will need to give her a new story. Meanwhile, Abby tries to enjoy her prospective new neighbors, but their comments lead to a violent outburst. Marvin takes Bridget to a party at the house of a hip-hop mogul. Conor "apologizes" to Alex, but it doesn't go well.
18	6	"Viagra"	John Dahl	Brett Johnson	August 17, 2014	1.44
Ashley introduces Ray to a new client; Ray turns to an unlikely source in finding dirt on Ed Cochran; Mickey sets his sights on a bigger payday; Terry and Potato Pie help Bunchy out when he gets a date with a single mother.
19	7	"Walk This Way"	Liev Schreiber	Ann Biderman	August 24, 2014	1.35
Conor requests that the Donovan family come together for his birthday, which Ray and Abby have forgotten; Ashley's stalker returns; Mickey's gift angers Daryl and strains his relationship with Claudette; An awkward incident leaves Bunchy confused; Terry learns an awful secret about his gym.
20	8	"Sunny"	John Dahl	David Hollander & Cheo Hodari Coker	August 31, 2014	1.49
Ray learns the truth about Abby's absences and confronts Jim (the cop) about their affair. Cookie wants Marvin back for himself because he feels that his initial investment entitles him to all the money that the boy will make. Mickey gets the opportunity to sell his life story as a trilogy, but ends up losing it. Bridget is the sole witness to Cookie's brutality in murdering Marvin and Re-Kon.
21	9	"Snowflake"	Guy Ferland	Michael Tolkin & Brett Johnson	September 7, 2014	1.63
Ray and Abby have different opinions on how to handle Bridget's dangerous situation of Cookie trying to murder her. Kate turns to a new source for answers; Bunchy has an awkward moment with his girlfriend's son; Mickey and Shorty plan a heist.
22	10	"Volcheck"	Michael Uppendahl	David Hollander	September 14, 2014	1.80
Kate's return to Los Angeles sets off a violent chain of events involving Ray's past; Cochran is offered directorship of the FBI, but discovers the horrifying video made by Ray. Mickey and Shorty welcome two new members to their heist crew; Abby gives Jim a startling ultimatum.
23	11	"Rodef"	Michael Uppendahl	Ron Nyswaner & Brett Johnson	September 21, 2014	1.68
Ray prepares his loved ones for his arrest; Mickey's heist does not go according to plan, and Terry is arrested and put into jail. Ray obtains the video of Marvin's murder; Jim cannot bring himself to follow through on Abby's plan; Ezra turns to Avi in dealing with Kate.
24	12	"The Captain"	Michael Uppendahl	Ann Biderman	September 28, 2014	1.97
Kate's murder at the hands of Avi (on Ezra's orders) forces Ray into action against several of his enemies. After the stolen safe yields less than expected, Mickey comes up with a new source for money. Jim gives Abby an enticing offer. An imprisoned Terry refuses to accept bail. Bunchy reveals his past to Patty. Ray kills Cookie in order to protect his daughter.

=== Season 3 (2015) ===
No. overall	No. in season	Title	Directed by	Written by	Original release date	U.S. viewers (millions)
25	1	"The Kalamazoo"	Colin Bucksey	David Hollander	July 12, 2015	1.04
Ezra is visited in his hospital bed by Father Thomas Romero, who quizzes him about the buried priest; soon afterward, Ezra dies. Ray rescues a client from a potential sex scandal and heads to a bar, where Abby calls him to tell him of Ezra’s death. Mickey looks after the daughter of call girl Ginger; he dislikes Ginger’s pimp and attempts to kill him. Andrew Finney engages Ray to recover Finney’s kidnapped son. Bunchy is trying to manage the gym while Terry is in jail; Abby visits for a drink and helps out. Bridget rejects a ride home from school from her drunken mother and complains about her to Conor when she gets home. Romero convinces a police officer to give him a box of evidence relating to the deceased Father Danny.
26	2	"Ding"	Ed Bianchi	William Wheeler	July 19, 2015	1.26
Mickey tries to take over Gary’s girls. Paige Finney hires Ray to find and pay off Carl LaFell, the husband of a woman a football star has been having an affair with. Avi offers Lena a partnership in his new business. When Bridget calls Ray about Abby’s behavior, and he visits briefly. Abby catches Conor watching porn and pleasuring himself. Bunchy falls for the female member of the Mexican team training at the gym. The group’s manager suggests using the gym as a venue for their show. Father Romero, posing as a member of Bunchy's support group, joins the gym. Terry is involved in a fight in prison; he prevails, but ends up in solitary.
27	3	"Come and Knock on Our Door"	Dan Attias	David Hollander	July 26, 2015	1.44
A beaten-up Ray returns home in the early morning to surprise Bridget and apologize for missing dinner. While talking, Ray sees the ghost of his dead sister in the room and leaves. Mickey receives a call from the prison and leaves Daryll to look after business; Daryll is soon overwhelmed, but Bunchy arrives and helps out. Ray is visited by Finney’s men, who try but fail to bring him onto the payroll. Mickey and Ray try different approaches to get Terry out of prison before he is killed by the Aryan gang. Mickey ends up inadvertently killing the judge, who had already refused cash from Ray. Ray turns to Finney, who leans on Governor Verona, ensuring Terry is released that evening. Ray repays Finney by signing up to work for him. Ray calls, saying Terry will be freed, then collects him from the prison.
28	4	"Breakfast of Champions"	Lesli Linka Glatter	Brett Johnson	August 2, 2015	1.37
Abby visits her family in Boston and fights with her sister. Bridget has a bad day at school and tries to get her teacher on her side. Conor skips school and borrows Abby’s car. Mickey tries to patch things up with Terry. Ray spends the day at Finney’s Imperial Studios, shepherding Casey around as required and helping Paige overcome some personnel issues so that she can best portray the studio to a potential buyer. Finney tells Ray that he works only for him and suggests things will get ugly. Paige calls Ray asking to meet; Ray declines, stating that he works only for her father. Ray gets a frosty reception from Bridget but stays at the family home in Abby’s absence.
29	5	"Handshake Deal"	Colin Bucksey	Gina Welch	August 9, 2015	1.32
Mickey sets up a "girls and gear" party for PJ and his tech company Kwip. Finney tasks Ray with retrieving a phone which contains damaging evidence of Governor Verona’s dalliances. Ray discovers that Paige was among Verona’s indiscretions. Bunchy’s heart is broken when Teresa and family leave after Terry spikes the wrestling deal. Romero tries again to befriend Bunchy. Bridget is having trouble with her college application. Abby, who has agreed to buy the bar and put it in Margaret’s name, agrees to come home. Mickey tries to extend his loan with the Armenians and ends up agreeing to give them 50% of the business. Ray comes home to find Mickey and Conor there, sending Conor to bed.
30	6	"Swing Vote"	John Dahl	Michael Tolkin	August 16, 2015	1.61
The Minassians show Mickey the punishment that awaits if payment is late. Ray tells Abby he does not want a divorce. Ray signs his contract with Paige. Finney calls in Ray to help delay a potential bidder for the NFL team so that he misses the deadline. Bunchy visits Teresa in Bakersfield and asks her to marry him; Teresa agrees, but only if he agrees to tell the truth, be faithful, not hit her, and drop the name Bunchy. Brendan agrees.
31	7	"All Must Be Loved"	Tucker Gates	David Hollander	August 23, 2015	1.37
Terry’s specialist advises him that he needs in-home support. Darryl is beaten and his car is taken by the Armenians over a $30,000 payment. Bunchy tells his family of his intention to marry Teresa and asks Ray for his settlement money. Ray okays the financing for Abby’s father’s bar. Paige tells Donovan she is divorcing Varick and fronts Ray $200k to bribe Helen Miller of Fish & Game. Romero offers Ray forgiveness for Father O’Connor’s murder if Ray confesses, but Ray turns on the priest and beats him. Bunchy and Mickey meet with the Armenians, who attack Mickey and Darryl until Bunchy steps in. Bridget's crush on her tutor, Greg Donellen, moves to the next level.
32	8	"Tulip"	Michael Uppendahl	David Hollander & William Wheeler	August 30, 2015	1.44
Paige tells Ray that they must seal the deal with Napier that week. Ray and Helen Miller attempt to plant some evidence on Napier. Romero simply hands Ray all of the evidence he has gathered. The Armenians torch Daryll’s car. Mickey becomes an informant again. Varick threatens to expose his relationship with Finney, who responds by hitting him fatally, with a fire poker. Avi helps him dispose of the body. Finney tells Paige he will pay Napier’s price for the land and that she can take control of the deal going forward. Bridget visits Donellen at home. Abby gets Terry cleaned up somewhat and he ends up staying in the room that Abby had prepared for him.
33	9	"The Octopus"	Colin Bucksey	Brett Johnson	September 6, 2015	1.41
Mickey works with law enforcement on a sting operation against the Minassians and their Russian supplier of trafficked girls, Ivan Belikov. Ray has Lena check out Teresa and family. The NFL is checking the Finneys' deal, and the absence of Varick leads them to have one of their investigators, disgraced former FBI director Ed Cochran, look into it. Cochran seems to relish the prospect of encountering Ray again. Mickey hides out in a motel. Muncie goes looking for him and arrests groom-to-be Bunchy when Mickey cannot be located. Ray agrees with Muncie to swap father for brother, then tracks down Mickey and convinces him to return. Donellen admits his feelings for Bridget. Bunchy and Teresa are married. Mickey asks Ray for help with his situation. Ray asks Lena to look into the Minassians.
34	10	"One Night in Yerevan"	Dan Attias	Gina Welch & David Hollander	September 13, 2015	1.43
Ray gets his old boss Lee Drexler to act as a legal representative for Mickey. Ray tries to convince the Minassians to let Mickey out of the deal they made. Cochran is gathering more evidence in his investigation of Ray, using the vetting of the Finney NFL deal as a reason. He finds the fire poker used to murder Varick in storage and takes it. Abby finds Mr. Donellen’s pill bottle in Bridget's room and confronts Bridget about it. When Abby learns the truth, she threatens to call the cops. Donellen lies to Abby, telling her that Bridget is obsessed with him because they both lost loved ones.
35	11	"Poker"	Colin Bucksey	Michael Tolkin & Brett Johnson	September 20, 2015	1.45
The LAPD begins to close in on the location of Varick's body and the murder weapon. Ray learns that the fire poker was taken by Cochran and forces Cochran to reveal that he hid it in Ray's apartment. Ray manages to get the poker to safety before the police search the apartment. Bridget tells Donellen how she feels, but he gently rebuffs her. Ray intercepts Paige on her way to the LAPD offices and tries to convince her to tell the truth. She tells the police that Finney killed Varick and that they were lovers. Ray and his team deposit the body and poker in a dumpster at Finney’s home and Lena torches the body. Ray and his team release the injured Cochran near his workplace. Mickey avoids having to move to Reno by convincing his boys he has Alzheimer’s, and claims that he is scared that Ray will lock him away somewhere. Ray confronts Mickey, who tells him they will all hate him if he is sent away, forcing Ray to relent.
36	12	"Exsuscito"	David Hollander	David Hollander & William Wheeler	September 27, 2015	1.50
Paige arrives at Ray’s apartment to ride out the media storm. Bridget arranges a liaison with Greg Donellen. Teresa tells Bunchy she is pregnant. Terry searches for Bridget at Mickey's apartment. Ray gets into a gunfight with the Minassians. Terry is badly hurt. Avi advises that the Minassians will kill all of Ray's family, so Ray and Avi plan to eliminate them; Ray, Avi, and Mickey manage to wipe out the Minassians, but Ray is shot in the process. Ray takes Bridget to visit Terry at the hospital. Ray fears Terry will die and visits Father O'Connor, who persuades him to go to confession. Leaving the confessional, Ray collapses. Romero drives him back towards L.A.

=== Season 4 (2016) ===
No. overall	No. in season	Title	Directed by	Written by	Original release date	U.S. viewers (millions)
37	1	"Girl with Guitar"	Liev Schreiber	David Hollander	June 20, 2016 (online); June 26, 2016 (Showtime)	1.11
Ray and Terry have recovered. Ray attends his first abuse survivors support meeting and tries to get Bridget to move back home. Abby gets alarming medical news that she has cancer. Mickey's new con fizzles. Ray gets a job offer but then has to help a friend out of a jam.
38	2	"Marisol"	John Dahl	Mike Binder & Rob Fresco	July 3, 2016	1.15
Ray helps Hector handle a person from his past who threatens to reveal a secret that could ruin Hector's boxing career. Meanwhile, Abby offers Bunchy a lesson in marital compromise, and Det. Muncie uses incriminating evidence against the Donovans to force Ray's hand, which draws him further into the path of the Russian mob.
39	3	"Little Bill Primm's Big Green Horseshoe"	Michael Apted	David Hollander & Miki Johnson	July 10, 2016	1.34
An intruder breaks into the Donovan household, forcing the family closer together. In Primm, Mickey schemes to rob a casino. Meanwhile, with a baby due, Bunchy and Teresa navigate marital woes as Ray visits Belikov to strike a deal.
40	4	"Federal Boobie Inspector"	Phil Abraham	Sean Conway	July 17, 2016	1.27
Ray visits a Hollywood power player in an attempt to get the Russian mob off his back and unearths a secret Ezra shared in the past. Meanwhile, Lena and an ex-girlfriend take Abby out on the town to help her confront her fears from her recent cancer diagnosis, and Mickey offers his boys a job prospect and tries to integrate himself back into the family.
41	5	"Get Even Before Leavin'"	Robert McLachlan	Chad Feehan	July 24, 2016	1.27
With the Russian mob threatening his family, Ray goes on a road trip with Mickey to retrieve the $4 million stolen from the casino. Meanwhile, Abby has some difficult decisions to make about her cancer, Bridget returns home, and Bunchy has serious marital problems.
42	6	"Fish and Bird"	Daisy von Scherler Mayer	David Hollander	July 31, 2016	1.24
Mickey takes the blame for the Armenian hit and goes to prison, meaning that Belikov is released. Bunchy has his daughter baptised and comes to live with Ray after Teresa leaves him. Ray settles his debt with the Russian mob, but complicates things when he kills Belikov, who had murdered a girl.
43	7	"Norman Saves the World"	Tricia Brock	Mike Binder & David Sonnenborn	August 7, 2016	1.13
Ray works with Cochran to try to get Mickey moved to a different prison, as he no longer has the protection of the Russians, predictably Cochran tries to double cross Ray. In the meantime the Armenians place a hit on Mickey, who is vulnerable without the protection of the Russians. Bunchy asks Abby to look after Maria for a while.
44	8	"The Texan"	Tucker Gates	David Hollander & Sean Conway	August 14, 2016	1.21
Ray visits The Texan in the hospital (after he was shot by Cochran in the last episode). Mickey is released from prison. Ray and Abby find out about Conor's gun; Bunchy finds out that Teresa's family have placed her in a mental hospital and tells Mickey, who encourages him to visit her. Bunchy finds out that Teresa has a history of depression dating back to childhood. Hector loses the right to fight the rematch when his sister Marisol does a TV interview discussing their sexual relationship. Ray turns his back on Hector, but Terry convinces him to help.
45	9	"Goodbye Beautiful"	James Whitmore Jr.	Chad Feehan & Miki Johnson	August 21, 2016	1.21
Belikov's dead body is found. Sonia arrives at Ray's home asking for help, and he gets her out of the country. Mickey, Bunchy, and Teresa go to Primm, where Mickey asks Bunchy to help him break into a safe. This plan results in Sylvie being shot and killed. Avi is captured by the Russians, who want to trade him for Sonia.
46	10	"Lake Hollywood"	Stephen Williams	David Hollander & Mike Binder	August 28, 2016	1.00
Ray, Lena, & Daryll steal the art from Sonia's gallery to trade for Avi. Hector's wife confronts him and tells him that she is leaving and taking their daughter; he kills Marisol and Ray covers up for him. Mickey, Bunchy, and Teresa go to Ray's house. Terry spends the night with Maureen.
47	11	"Chinese Algebra"	John Dahl	Sean Conway & Chad Feehan	September 11, 2016	1.47
Mickey goes to the station to get the money he stole from Primm for Ray, who wants him to place a bet on Hector losing the fight. Mickey gets to the bookie's place; the bookie is dead, so Ray asks a stripper he met on a plane for help finding someone to take the bet. Ray tells Hector that he must throw the fight in return for Ray's covering up Hector's killing of Marisol. Ray exchanges the art and betting slips for Avi. FBI agent Frank Barnes picks up Ray and asks him to assist getting the Russians; Ray refuses, so later Barnes arrests Ray.
48	12	"Rattus Rattus"	David Hollander	David Hollander	September 18, 2016	1.34
The FBI raid Ray's office and confiscate all his files. They have Sonia in custody and want to use her and Ray to arrest the Russians. Abby tells Ray that her cancer is disappearing. Ray agrees to wear a wire for the return of his files. Terry confronts Ray about Hector throwing the fight and Abby overhears, so Rays tells her everything. Lena tells Ray that Sonia's body has been in the morgue for 3 days. Mickey discovers that the Russians are smuggling drugs in the back of the artwork at Sonia's gallery. Ray gathers the Donovans, Avi, & Lena together to make a plan to take down the Russians. Ray tells Hector to win the fight.

=== Season 5 (2017) ===
No. overall	No. in season	Title	Directed by	Written by	Original release date	U.S. viewers (millions)
49	1	"Abby"	David Hollander	David Hollander	August 6, 2017	1.13
Abby has died, Bridget is in New York, and Conor has enrolled in military school. Ray begins court-ordered anger management sessions after a bar fight in which he beat up Mickey. Terry had an operation to help control the symptoms of Parkinson's. Mickey, Bunchy, and Daryll prepare for Terry and Maureen's wedding. Bridget looks up a man called Smitty in New York. Meanwhile, Sam Winslow, a powerful new employer, comes into Ray's life.
50	2	"Las Vegas"	John Dahl	David Hollander & Miki Johnson	August 13, 2017	1.11
A flashback to Ray and Abby's 21st anniversary when they went to Las Vegas to see Damon's first televised fight. In the present, movie star Natalie James hires Ray to protect her from an abusive husband/manager. Hopes for a beautiful day are dashed at Terry and Maureen's wedding as tensions flare between the Donovans and the Dohertys.
51	3	"Dogwalker"	John Dahl	Sean Conway	August 20, 2017	1.06
Ray cleans up Natalie's mess. Teresa leaves on a tour. Maureen found out that Terry slept with a prostitute the night before he proposed, so she leaves him to think. Unable to reach Maureen, Terry visits Conor at military school. Frank Barnes visits Mickey and tells him that he needs him to kill Avi. Bunchy is offered the opportunity to buy a storage unit building as an investment.
52	4	"Sold"	Tucker Gates	Chad Feehan	August 27, 2017	1.07
Mickey's screenwriting script has been rejected. He helps one of Daryll's movie star clients who has accidentally killed someone and blackmails them. Flashbacks show Abby being given a terminal diagnosis. Terry tries to win back Maureen one last time. Bunchy takes the cash out of his safe for a business deal but when he stops at a local sandwich shop (with the money in a diaper bag), he is robbed. Bridget tells her boyfriend that she thinks her father got him sick so that Abby could take his place in the cancer trial.
53	5	"Shabbos Goy"	Daisy von Scherler Mayer	David Hollander & William Wheeler	September 10, 2017	1.08
Ray has sold the house. Mickey kidnaps Avi, intending to kill him on Frank Barnes' demand. Avi tells Mickey that Frank only wants him dead as he has been working for him, so Mickey does not kill Avi. Mickey tells Barnes that he will not kill Avi, so Barnes arrests Bunchy. Terry takes Damon to New York to train for a fight. Bunchy arrives drunk to collect Maria from daycare.
54	6	"Shelley Duvall"	Michael Uppendahl	Miki Johnson & David Sonnenborn	September 17, 2017	1.05
In a flashback we see Abby decide to stop treatment. In his attempt to free Bunchy, Mickey follows Avi and ends up being locked in a trunk when a drug deal goes wrong. Terry visits Bridget and meets Smitty and discovers that the operation for Abby would have worked. Ray discovers how dangerous Sam Winslow really is.
55	7	"If I Should Fall from Grace with God"	Michael Uppendahl	David Hollander & Chad Feehan	September 24, 2017	1.15
Daryll is made a producer for Mickey's film so that he can convince Mickey to accept the total rewrite. Mickey goes to Ray and tells him that Barnes wanted him to kill Avi but he refused and that Barnes arrested Bunchy. Ray meets with Barnes, who tells him that Avi has now killed a DEA agent and that he needs him dead, so Ray agrees as long as Mickey goes to jail. Ray fakes Avi's death and Bunchy is released. While he was in prison, Bunchy saw one of the men who robbed him; he pays the man's bail so that he can help him find his money. Terry comes back to Los Angeles and tells Ray that the operation Abby was supposed to have would have worked. He then confesses that he gave Abby the drugs to kill herself. Barnes goes to arrest Mickey, so Daryll shoots and kills him.
56	8	"Horses"	Zetna Fuentes	William Wheeler	October 1, 2017	1.22
A flashback shows Abby telling Ray that she was not chosen to be one of the three people in a last-ditch surgery trial. She then tells Terry that Ray has thrown away the pills she had for her suicide, but that her doctor has reissued the prescription and she needs him to pick them up. Ray and Avi go to New York to poison Smitty to make him ineligible for the surgery, hoping that Abby will then get his place. The Donovans have the opening of Abby's Bar, not realizing that she is using this time to say goodbye. Terry gives Abby the pill bottle and goes downstairs to play cards with Bridget. He comes back to check on Abby, who is emptying the capsules into a glass, so he helps her, and Bridget pours the drink into the glass. Abby drinks. Ray is on the plane back when he gets a call telling him that Abby has now been offered a spot on the trial. He comes home and finds that Abby has died—Terry goes to the bar and tells the family. Ray follows, confronts Bridget, and beats up Mickey and Bunchy. Ray is arrested.
57	9	"Mister Lucky"	Guy Ferland	Sean Conway	October 8, 2017	1.21
Mickey and Daryll dispose of Frank Barnes' body. Ray is in the news for his relationship with Natalie, which results in Natalie's husband killing her and then himself. Mickey and Daryll celebrate getting the green light on their movie. Unbeknownst to Daryll, Mickey has blackmailed Jay White again, and he confesses all to the DA. Terry prepares to leave the Fite Club behind for good. Bunchy locates his money but is shot when he tries to retrieve it. Ray hunts down George, Sam's son, who has stolen from her, and finds out that Landry is responsible—Sam tells him that she will deal with it.
58	10	"Bob the Builder"	Stephen Williams	Chad Feehan	October 15, 2017	1.24
Sam makes a deal with Landry to keep her secret and rings Ray to tell him not to mention Landry to the police in connection with Natalie. Ray ignores this and tells the police that Natalie was pregnant with Landry's child. Ray gets Bunchy patched up after his injury; Bunchy asks him and Terry to help him get his money back, and they succeed. Jay asks for a secret meeting with Daryll and gets him to confess that Mickey is blackmailing him, but Jay has set Daryll up, as the DA has been listening in. Bridget takes desperate measures to try to get Smitty the surgery and is arrested. Sam visits Ray and tells him that he ruined her deal with Landry, so she now wants Ray to kill him.
59	11	"Michael"	Carl Franklin	Miki Johnson	October 22, 2017	1.23
Ray searches for Frank Barnes to get Bridget out of jail and asks Mickey where he is; Mickey refuses to tell him, and Ray hits him. Ray then speaks to Daryll, who tells him the truth. Ray goes to the DA to try and bargain for Bridget's release. In New York, Terry deals with the return of Damon's father and takes care of Smitty at Bridget's request. Back in LA, Bunchy is hit with a heartbreaking confession from Teresa that she slept with someone while on the Lucha Tour. Bridget is released and returns to New York. Armed police arrest Mickey. Ray comes home and Daryll confronts him about giving up Mickey. Ray tells Daryll to get the gun and take it to the police and tell them that he saw Mickey shoot Barnes. Mickey uses his one phone call to tell Ray that he is going to get him.
60	12	"Time Takes a Cigarette"	David Hollander	David Hollander	October 29, 2017	1.18
Ray attends Natalie's funeral and asks Sam if she can help with surgery for Smitty. The DA calls Ray looking for the gun that killed Barnes. Mickey gives the DA a list of people whom Ray killed, hoping to turn the tables on him. Bunchy tells Daryll to dispose of the gun and that Ray will have to find another way to save Bridget. Ray goes with Conor while he enlists. Daryll gets a call from Jay White just as he is about to throw the gun in the river. Jay shows Daryll an office and tells him that it’s his as producer of the film if he testifies against Mickey. Ray has his final therapy sessionand is told he has PTSD and needs treatment. Following Natalie's death, Ray's clients are leaving him, which is reported on the news. Daryll gives Ray the gun and he brings it to the DA. The cancer doctor calls Ray and tells him that she is being threatened with the end of her career unless she helps Ray and operates on Smitty. Ray gives Bunchy the bar and asks him to look after the dog. Bunchy tells Teresa to leave Maria with him and to go. Smitty has the surgery and Ray kills Landry, making it look like suicide, as his payment to Sam for arranging the surgery. Ray sees a vision of Abby and follows her, jumping off the roof of a building into the river.

=== Season 6 (2018–19) ===
No. overall	No. in season	Title	Directed by	Written by	Original release date	U.S. viewers (millions)
61	1	"Staten Island, Part One"	Allen Coulter	David Hollander	October 19, 2018 (online); October 28, 2018 (Showtime)	0.81
Ray is pulled from the East River by police officer Sean “Mac” McGrath and taken over the bridge to Staten Island. Once Sam gets him released from custody, he has a drink with Mac and, after helping him in a fight with some firemen, decides to stay on Staten Island. Bunchy loses custody of Maria. Ray discovers that Mac is in trouble so he contacts Sam Winslow, who wants him to help Anita Novak in return for helping Mac. Ray goes to visit Terry at the New York gym and bumps into Bridget and Smitty. Mickey gives himself a nicotine overdose while in prison, causing him to collapse and subsequently be rushed to the hospital. Ray gets a call from Anita Novak, who says she has killed someone.
62	2	"Staten Island, Part Two"	Allen Coulter	David Hollander & Miki Johnson	November 4, 2018	0.73
Anita Novak has shot and killed the man who hit her and Sam asks Ray to deal with it. Smitty proposes to Bridget, who says yes. Bunchy gets a call telling him that Mickey has had a heart attack; he phones the others and tells them that Mickey is dying. Mac tells Ray the truth about what happened the night he jumped, so Ray deals with Mac and Anita's problems at the same time. Mickey asks Bunchy to get him out of the hospital, which he does. Sam tells Ray why she needs Anita Novak to be mayor and tells him that she will pay him $100,000 a week until Anita is elected and then double after that.
63	3	"He Be Tight. He Be Mean."	Tucker Gates	Chad Feehan	November 11, 2018	0.87
Ray accepts Sam's offer of a job and is now located in New York. Lena follows him from California. Bunchy kidnaps Maria and goes to Long Island with Mickey. Anita is behind in the polls, so Ray has to ensure that she makes a splash at the first mayoral debate. Daryll struggles with his leading man on the set of Mr. Lucky. Terry discovers a fight club in a warehouse in Brooklyn, while Bunchy considers a new identity, with help from old family member Sandy. Daryll is with Jay White when Mickey turns up and kidnaps Jay.
64	4	"Pudge"	Tucker Gates	Sean Conway	November 18, 2018	0.87
Mickey has kidnapped movie star Jay White and his ransom is $3 million plus 3 passports for himself, Bunchy, and Maria. Ray contacts Sam for the payoff. An Internal Affairs officer confronts Mac about drugs he had previously booked going missing. Terry steps into the ring for the first time in 20 years and wins. Ray meets to hand over the ransom and finds that Bunchy is the one waiting. Bunchy releases Jay, but Mickey gets drunk and falls asleep, and Sandy steals all the money. Smitty owes $80,000 to a loan shark and tricks Ray into coming to his aid, saying Bridget is in trouble. Ray drags Smitty with him to take care of the debt.
65	5	"Ellis Island"	Robert McLachlan	David Hollander	November 25, 2018	0.99
Hoping to make up for lost time, Ray plans a day with Conor in New York before he ships out to Germany with the Marines. Mac arrests the loan shark, Chalky, while Bridget tells Ray, returning with Smitty, to stay out of their life. Mickey steals a car and goes on the lam with Bunchy and Maria, hatching a wild plan to recoup their losses. Bunchy asks Terry for a favor. Sam tries to strike a deal with Mayor Feratti, then puts together a fix with Ray to give Anita a bump in popularity, again involving Lena's friend Justine. Ray and Conor get kicked off the set of Mr. Lucky, from which Daryl is also banned. They make plans to go to Ellis Island, but Conor doesn't show up, spending the afternoon instead with Bridget and Smitty.
66	6	"A Girl Named Maria"	Michael Uppendahl	Miki Johnson	December 2, 2018	1.05
A masked intruder threatens Sam at gunpoint, warning her to withdraw Anita as candidate for mayor. Ray confronts Mayor Feratti, while Mac is pursued by Internal Affairs about his connection to Ray and the mayoralty race. Ray discovers it was a cop who broke into Sam's house, but Mac warns him to back off and leave New York. On the lam disguised as priests, Mickey and Bunchy botch the Hampton Jitney robbery and instead knock off a check cashing outlet. Bridget steps in to take care of her baby cousin, as Terry can’t stay away from his chance to fight again. Bunchy returns, but Teresa takes Maria. The NYPD pull Ray over and arrest him.
67	7	"The 1-3-2"	Zetna Fuentes	Chad Feehan	December 9, 2018	1.01
NYPD officers take Ray to the basement of precinct 132 for interrogation. Internal Affairs officer Emerson threatens to arrest Mac if he doesn't help expose the police plot behind Mayor Feratti's campaign, and eventually approaches Ray directly. After Mac gets him released, Ray forces Justine to go on a news program and expose the fake Central Park rape attack, in which Novak had come to the rescue. Terry tries to talk Bunchy out of turning himself in. On a road trip to Boston with Daryll, they visit the graves of their mother and sister, and by the end of the day spot Sandy on a street in their old neighbourhood. Mickey, on the run, considers the great white north, first going incognito for a quick stopover back in New York. Having solved his problems at least temporarily, Ray gets drunk and passes out, waking to find an intruder in his living room.
68	8	"Who Once Was Dead"	Tarik Saleh	Sean Conway	December 16, 2018	1.05
Sam's new henchman tells Ray to return her money and leave New York, but Emerson demands Ray's continued involvement to implicate Mayor Feratti in corruption. Ray tracks down Sam and reassures her that he'll repay her, and will take down Feratti so her prison land development can proceed. In a TV interview, Novak denies orchestrating the Central Park attack. Ray finds Justine hanging in her shower. Bunchy and Daryll recover the ransom money from Sandy and return to New York, a contrite Sandy in tow, to find Mickey waiting for them. Ray catches up with Bunchy and takes back the money, dashing Bunchy's hopes of reuniting with Teresa and Maria. Bridget loses her internship on the Novak campaign and tells Ray she wants him out of her life. Ray collapses on the street in Times Square, and after an altercation with police wakes up in restraints in a psychiatric hospital. Meanwhile, Terry's latest underground fight worsens his Parkinson's.
69	9	"Dream On"	Denise Di Novi	David Hollander & Karl Taro Greenfeld	December 23, 2018	0.93
Bridget visits Ray in the hospital and he asks her to reach out to Mac to get him released. Learning some hard truths about her father from Lena, Bridget decides to stay in the city and help him. Ray goes to see Mayor Feratti, who is spooked by the IA investigation and wants to shut down the prison kickback scam. Bunchy stands in for the ailing Terry in his next fight, while Daryll and Sandy consider a recording business. Returning wearing a wire from Emerson, Ray offers to serve up a corrupt judge as the IA informant in exchange for Feratti's help in ending the FBI hunt for Bunchy. Feratti asks Ray to kill the judge. Mac and the corrupt cops kidnap Emerson and attack Ray, knowing he recorded the mayor ordering a hit on the judge. Mickey in Ray's apartment waits with a gun.
70	10	"Baby"	John Dahl	Miki Johnson	December 30, 2018	0.95
Ray escapes his police captors by jumping out a window. He meets Sam and gives her the recording of Mayor Feratti ordering a hit on the judge. Back in his apartment, Ray informs Mickey that he gave back the $3 million. Mac and the other crooked cops kidnap Bridget to force Ray's cooperation. Ray tries to retrieve the Feratti recording, but with the election approaching, Sam keeps a copy to release to the media and ensure Novak's win. Bunchy dreams of a new life, but gets picked up by the FBI. Ray uses Mickey, Daryll, and Smitty to snatch one of the cops and coerce Bridget's location out of him. They enter the house, and Mickey shoots a cop, but Bridget and Mac are gone.
71	11	"Never Gonna Give You Up"	Joshua Marston	Sean Conway & Chad Feehan	January 6, 2019	1.04
Ray, Mickey, and Daryll cross paths with the corrupt cops who are also looking for Bridget, and Ray shoots one of them. Ray tries to contact Mayor Feratti, who orders Mac to bring Ray in. Instead, Mac meets up with Ray and leads him to the motel where Bridget is held captive. Ray releases her, while Mac kills himself in his car. Sandy and Smitty watch over a blindfolded cop while Mickey and Daryll deal with bodies. Feratti reassures Judge Scholl that he'll win the election, make their scandal go away, and get revenge on Sam Winslow. Meanwhile, getting no answers from Bunchy, an FBI agent brings in Terry, who tells Bunchy to give up Mickey in order to save himself. Bridget confronts Ray about his suicide attempt and begs him to get help.
72	12	"The Dead"	David Hollander	David Hollander	January 13, 2019	1.21
Mickey, Daryll, and Sandy work to clean up the mess, cutting up bodies and digging a hole in the back yard. Smitty ponders his role in the Donovan family. Despite having seen Bridget wielding a chainsaw, he takes her to the courthouse to get married, with Terry serving as witness. Ray asks Mickey why he left their mother to die alone, and questions his brothers on Mickey's failure as a father. Feratti goes on TV claiming he was set up by Samantha Winslow. Anita Novak concedes the mayoral race. Ray goes to see Sam, who apologizes for putting Bridget in harm's way. Ray meets Feratti, who offers a truce, then picks up Bunchy to bring him home, where Mickey realizes the likely price of Bunchy's freedom. Lena finishes cleaning up after Ray, killing Sam and her henchman Vinny, and getting revenge for Justine's murder. Ray books an appointment with Dr. Amiot, the psychiatrist who treated him during his psychiatric hold after having a panic attack.

=== Season 7 (2019–20) ===
No. overall	No. in season	Title	Directed by	Written by	Original release date	U.S. viewers (millions)
73	1	"Faith. Hope. Love. Luck."	Joshua Marston	David Hollander	November 17, 2019	0.91
Ray drives a hesitant Mickey to the FBI to turn himself in. The severed head of officer Al Clancy is found submerged in a duffel bag, and the homicide investigation heats up, led by a determined Detective Perry. Stu Feldman asks Ray to deal with a stalker, but after chasing him through the Met, Ray takes a softer approach. Dr. Amiot asks Ray if he can forgive his father, and encourages him to visit Mickey in prison. Bunchy takes a job stocking shelves in a drug store where Terry, his Parkinson's worsening, is convinced by a stranger to visit an herbal medicine center. Bridget expresses misgivings to Ray about getting married. Now working for Mayor Feratti, Ray and Lena blackmail a businessman to force him to honor a construction deal. Mickey is transferred to a maximum security prison upstate; en route, his bus crashes and explodes.
74	2	"A Good Man Is Hard to Find"	Joshua Marston	Joshua Marston	November 24, 2019	0.87
Mickey is presumed dead following the bus crash. Ray collects his belongings from the prison, while Darryl and Bunchy begin planning the funeral. The Donovans work on their alibis as the police murder investigation intensifies, and Ray and Lena manipulate evidence to throw them off the trail. Bunchy foils an armed robbery at the drugstore. Kevin Sullivan offers Ray $1.5 million for the compromising photos, but Ray refuses to turn against Mayor Feratti. Lena confides in Bridget that she is going to move back to L.A. Ray tries to pay off Mac's widow, but she refuses to implicate him in police murders. Despite therapy with Dr. Amiot, Ray grows more despondent. Stu presses Ray to deal with the stalker, whom Ray ultimately attacks in a drunken stupor. As the Donovan family gathers to drink to their father's memory, there's a knock on the door. It's Mickey.
75	3	"Family Pictures"	Nick Gomez	David Hollander & David Bar Katz	December 1, 2019	0.93
With Mickey declared dead following the prison bus explosion, Ray plants his fingerprints with other evidence at the crime scenes so Mickey will take the rap for the police killings. After Sandy phones anonymous tips to the NYPD hotline, Detective Perry's superior closes the case. Mayor Feratti instructs Ray to find a witness to accuse Kevin Sullivan of molestation, but after meeting Sullivan's sister and realizing their Boston connection, Ray instead gives her the blackmail photos. Bunchy's heroism is unappreciated by his employer. Terry follows Liberty to meet a shaman, hoping for a cure. Ray sends a reluctant Mickey away to the Maldives to disappear. Lena hands Ray her resignation. Bridget initiates an encounter with Adam Rain.
76	4	"Hispes"	Tucker Gates	Tanya Barfield & Laura Marks	December 8, 2019	0.82
Mayor Feratti sends tactical units to pressure Ray and the Sullivans, and Ray works out a new deal. Bunchy tries to help the armed robber he shot at the drug store, who is now paralyzed, and ends up at a white supremacist meeting. Bridget and Smitty are called in to fix Jonathan Walker Hanson's unsavory publicity scandal. Mickey, who never left for the Maldives, connects with Sandy when she helps Ray retrieve money from the Sullivans which dates back to a heist in 1977. His stepfather offers Daryll an opportunity to leave the Donovans once and for all, and Claudette contacts Detective Perry. Terry gives up on a shamanic cure and considers drowning himself, but is talked out of it by a dying woman.
77	5	"An Irish Lullaby"	Dash Mihok	Jim Leonard & Kelly Wiles	December 15, 2019	0.91
Leaving Molly Sullivan's apartment, Ray encounters her father Jim, who offers to pay him to bury the compromising photos of Kevin. Ray finds Terry and brings him to Coney Island to pick up Ray's impounded car. Mickey, Sandy, and Daryll search for the truth about the 1977 heist, kidnapping Larry O'Malley, an old associate of the Donovans. O'Malley confesses that Jim Sullivan framed Mickey, and claims there are tapes incriminating Sullivan. Bunchy gets fired for refusing to sign a company statement against the robber he shot in the drug store, so he puts on a mask and robs a few stores, giving the cash to the mother. A guilt-ridden Bridget admits to her affair with Adam Rain. Smitty later finds Rain, attacks him with a baseball bat, and gets arrested. Meanwhile, Detective Perry continues to dig into the Donovan family's past.
78	6	"Inside Guy"	John Dahl	Laura Marks & Tanya Barfield	December 22, 2019	0.89
Mickey and Sandy sneak into Larry O'Malley's nursing home room, then go to his son's house, where Daryll kills him and steals the tapes that O'Malley, a retired cop, had been making for 30 years. After meeting with Jim Sullivan, Ray finds the son's body and realizes Daryll has been helping Mickey, who never left New York. Bridget gets Adam to drop the assault charges against Smitty, who is questioned by Detective Perry about the three police murders. Bunchy, now working for Ray, finds out the drugstore robber he shot has died. Ray follows the trail from Sandy's credit card to the gay beach resort where Mickey has been hiding out. Pursuing Mickey from a bar, Ray is confronted by Daryll, who knocks him out with a bottle.
79	7	"The Transfer Agent"	Kyra Sedgwick	David Hollander & David Bar Katz	December 29, 2019	1.00
In a flashback to 1977, Mickey tries to muscle in on a coin heist with the Jim Sullivan crew, but he takes the rap instead, getting arrested by Larry O'Malley. Ray-Ray Donovan, angered at his father for abandoning his dying mother, goes looking for Mickey with a knife but is talked out of it by Jim. In the present day, Mickey calls Jim to sell him the incriminating tapes. Mickey, Daryll, and Sandy kidnap Jim and negotiate for a Donovan cut of the heist. Jim agrees to a percentage of his wealth, paid in shares in the name of Terence Donovan. With Bunchy and Terry's help, Ray and Molly track down Mickey and Jim. They try to stop Jim's transfer agent, but he hands off the ransom to Daryll. After starting a fire at Sandy's house, Ray follows the trail to Mickey and Jim. Ray arrives, but Mickey forces his way out with a gun to Jim's head, and Ray cuts Jim loose.
80	8	"Passport and a Gun"	John Dahl	Joshua Marston & Kelly Wiles	January 5, 2020	1.02
Returning to his office, Jim Sullivan is shot at in the street by Gary O'Malley in revenge for the deaths of his father and brother. Daryll hides the ransom in a motel room and calls Jasmine to bring his gun and their passports. Ray reflects back on his teenage years collecting debts for Jim Sullivan, but is shaken by the claim that Sullivan may have had something to do with his sister Bridget's suicide and the death of his wife Abby. Ray asks Molly to find a tape in her father's office. Declan offers Daryll cash for the shares he has in the Sullivan company, but then tries to double-cross him. Daryll and Jasmine escape, but she is fatally shot. Terry and Bunchy head upstate to retrieve an emerald the shaman stole from Terry's new friend Delores. Smitty wears a wire and gets Ray to incriminate himself for the police murders.
81	9	"Bugs"	Ed Bianchi	Jim Leonard	January 12, 2020	0.92
At the police station, Ray hears Detective Perry's evidence. With his back against the wall, he reveals the prison kickback scam, implicates Mayor Feratti, and turns to Judge Scholl to clear his name. Scholl is hesitant to go to the police, but with Bunchy's help Ray convinces him that the mayor is coming for him, and pushes him to meet Perry in a remote cabin. Mickey finds someone to sell the Sullivan shares and convinces Smitty to open a bank account to receive the funds. Daryll waits despondently for the Sullivans to come at him, but Ray reassures him he'll take care of it. Terry goes for therapy and encounters Dr. Amiot, who figures out the Donovan connection. As Scholl meets with Perry giving detailed evidence against Feratti, assassins shoot Perry's partner and chase the judge into the woods.
82	10	"You'll Never Walk Alone"	David Hollander	David Hollander & Liev Schreiber	January 19, 2020	1.05
From the tapes recovered by Molly, Ray finally learns the truth about his sister Bridget's death. She was pregnant by Jim Sullivan, who had raped her, and after reaching out to her absent father for help, she had jumped from a building. Ray lures Sullivan to his office and executes him, burying him in the woods with the bodies of the assassins sent to kill Judge Scholl. Detective Perry, now with the full evidence, tells Ray she'll take care of the case and keep his daughter out of it. After his friend Delores kills herself, a distraught Terry wanders the streets, ending up on the roof of the Empire State Building. Ray tells Molly he can't be with her because of her father. Smitty and Bridget reconcile and plan to return to L.A. Mickey, taking the valise of shares from Ray at gunpoint, arranges to sell them, but Kevin Sullivan is in on the deal. At the exchange, Declan arrives, shoots and kills Smitty, and is shot by Daryll, who contemplates killing Mickey but instead watches as he runs off with the money.

== Ratings ==
Ray Donovan : U.S. viewers per episode (millions)

Season	Episode number												Average
Season	1	2	3	4	5	6	7	8	9	10	11	12	Average
1	1.35	1.56	1.45	1.52	1.46	1.45	1.44	1.47	1.33	1.25	1.41	1.41	1.46
2	1.22	1.27	1.38	1.45	1.42	1.44	1.35	1.49	1.63	1.80	1.68	1.97	1.51
3	1.04	1.26	1.44	1.37	1.32	1.61	1.37	1.44	1.41	1.43	1.45	1.50	1.39
4	1.11	1.15	1.34	1.27	1.27	1.24	1.13	1.21	1.21	1.00	1.47	1.34	1.22
5	1.13	1.11	1.06	1.07	1.08	1.05	1.15	1.22	1.21	1.24	1.23	1.18	1.14
6	0.81	0.73	0.87	0.87	0.99	1.05	1.01	1.05	0.93	0.95	1.04	1.21	0.96
7	0.91	0.87	0.93	0.82	0.91	0.89	1.00	1.02	0.92	1.05	–		0.93

Audience measurement performed by Nielsen Media Research
