= Personal Effects (film) =

- Theatrical release poster
- Directed by: David Hollander
- Screenplay by: David Hollander
- Based on: "Mansion on the Hill" by Rick Moody
- Produced by: Gil Netter; Kirk Shaw; David Hollander
- Starring: Michelle Pfeiffer; Ashton Kutcher; Kathy Bates; Spencer Hudson
- Cinematography: Ellito Davis
- Edited by: Lori Jane Coleman
- Music by: Jóhann Jóhannsson
- Production companies: Insight Film Studios; Tadora KG; Three Rivers Entertainment; Gil Netter Productions; Picture Park Productions
- Distributed by: Screen Media Films
- Release dates: December 12, 2008 (Iowa City); March 5, 2009 (United States; limited)
- Running time: 110 minutes
- Countries: United States; Canada; Germany
- Language: English

Personal Effects is a 2008 romantic drama film directed by David Hollander and starring Michelle Pfeiffer, Ashton Kutcher, and Kathy Bates. It is based on the short story "Mansion on the Hill" from Rick Moody's book Demonology. The film premiered in Iowa City on December 12, 2008, as part of a fundraiser for Iowa Flood Relief. The DVD was released on May 12, 2009.

The film was filmed in the Vancouver, British Columbia, area.

== Synopsis ==
Walter is a young wrestler trying to deal with the brutal death of his sister. He returns home to help his mother Gloria and niece. After getting a dead-end job at Mega Burger as a chicken, wearing a yellow chicken suit, who stands outside and offers samples to passing pedestrians, he meets Linda, a beautiful older woman who is a widow and works as a wedding planner. Her alcoholic husband was murdered by his friend in a bar and she has a deaf and mute son named Clay, who misses his father and has repressed anger towards the killer. As both Linda and Walter try to cope with the pain and frustration of their loss, the two bond, and their shared tragedies spawn an unlikely and beautiful romance. Walter befriends Clay and gets him into wrestling.

== Cast ==
- Michelle Pfeiffer as Linda
- Ashton Kutcher as Walter
- Kathy Bates as Gloria
- Spencer Hudson as Clay
- John Mann as Hank
- David Lewis as Brice
- Rob LaBelle as Camden
- Sarah Lind as Annie
- Jay Brazeau as Martin
- Brian Markinson as Finneran
- Jennifer Chan as Grace
- Topher Grace as Clay (voice)

== Release ==
In March 2009, it was released in the United States.
