= Ray Donovan =

American crime drama television series (2013-2020)

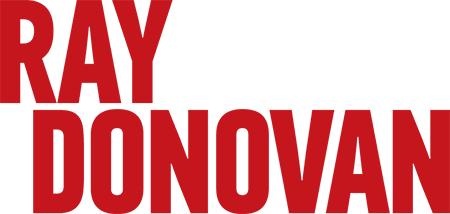
- Genre: Crime drama Family drama Psychological drama Neo-noir
- Created by: Ann Biderman
- Starring: Liev Schreiber; Paula Malcomson; Eddie Marsan; Dash Mihok; Steven Bauer; Katherine Moennig; Pooch Hall; Kerris Dorsey; Devon Bagby; Jon Voight; Susan Sarandon; Graham Rogers
- Composer: Marcelo Zarvos
- Country of origin: United States
- Original language: English
- No. of seasons: 7
- No. of episodes: 82 (list of episodes)

Production
- Executive producers: Bryan Zuriff; Mark Gordon; Ann Biderman; David Hollander; Lou Fusaro
- Producer: Allen Coulter
- Production locations: Los Angeles, California; New York City, New York
- Running time: 45–60 minutes
- Production companies: The Mark Gordon Company; Bider Sweet Productions (seasons 1–2); David Hollander Productions (seasons 3–7); Showtime Networks

Original release
- Network: Showtime
- Release: June 30, 2013 – January 19, 2020

Related
- Ray Donovan: The Movie

Ray Donovan is an American crime drama television series created by Ann Biderman for Showtime. The drama, starring Liev Schreiber in the title role, is set primarily in Los Angeles (during seasons 1–5) and in New York City (during seasons 6–7). The main character, Ray Donovan, is a professional "fixer" who arranges bribes, payoffs, threats, crime-scene clean-up, and other illegal activities to protect his (usually) celebrity clients. Good at his job, he is also normally devoted to his children and brothers but has a complicated relationship with his wife. He encounters problems when his menacing father, Mickey Donovan (Jon Voight), is unexpectedly released from prison. The FBI attempts to bring down Mickey and his associates, and Donovan struggles to escape the undertow.

The series' twelve-episode first season premiered on June 30, 2013. The pilot episode broke viewership records, becoming the biggest premiere of all time on Showtime. In February 2020, the series was cancelled after seven seasons. The show's storyline concluded with the feature-length Ray Donovan: The Movie, which premiered on January 14, 2022, on Showtime.

== Episodes ==
Season	Episodes	Originally released	
Season	Episodes	First released	Last released
1	12	June 30, 2013	September 22, 2013
2	12	July 13, 2014	September 28, 2014
3	12	July 12, 2015	September 27, 2015
4	12	June 26, 2016	September 18, 2016
5	12	August 6, 2017	October 29, 2017
6	12	October 28, 2018	January 13, 2019
7	10	November 17, 2019	January 19, 2020

== Cast and characters ==
=== Main ===
- Liev Schreiber as Raymond "Ray" Donovan
- Paula Malcomson as Abigail "Abby" Donovan, Ray's wife (seasons 1–5)
- Eddie Marsan as Terrence "Terry" Donovan, Ray's older brother. He is a former boxer, afflicted with Parkinson's disease.
- Dash Mihok as Brendan "Bunchy" Donovan, Ray's younger brother. He identifies as a sexual anorexic.
- Pooch Hall as Daryll Donovan, Ray's younger half-brother (son of Mickey and Claudette)
- Steven Bauer as Avi Rudin, Ray's right-hand man, a former IDF soldier and ex–Mossad agent (seasons 1–5)
- Katherine Moennig as Lena Burnham, Ray's investigative assistant
- Kerris Dorsey as Bridget Donovan, Ray's daughter
- Devon Bagby as Conor Donovan, Ray's son (seasons 1–6)
- Jon Voight as Michael "Mickey" Donovan, Ray's father
- Susan Sarandon as Samantha "Sam" Winslow, Ray's new boss (recurring season 5; season 6)
- Graham Rogers as Jacob "Smitty" Smith, Bridget's boyfriend turned husband (recurring season 5; seasons 6–7)

=== Recurring ===
- Elliott Gould as Ezra Goldman (seasons 1–3)
- Peter Jacobson as Lee Drexler (seasons 1–3)
- Denise Crosby as Debra "Deb" Goldman (seasons 1–5)
- William Stanford Davis as Potato Pie (seasons 1–5)
- Ambyr Childers as Ashley Rucker (seasons 1–2, 4)
- Josh Pais as Stuart "Stu" Feldman (seasons 1–2, 4, 6–7)
- Sheryl Lee Ralph as Claudette (seasons 1–2, 7)
- Paul Michael Glaser as Alan (seasons 1–2, 7)
- Austin Nichols as Thomas "Tommy" Wheeler (seasons 1–4, 7)
- Brooke Smith as Frances Simpson (seasons 1–3)
- Michael McGrady as Frank Barnes (seasons 1–5)
- Craig Ricci Shaynak as Kenneth "Tiny" Benson (seasons 1–2)
- Octavius J. Johnson as Marvin Gaye Washington (seasons 1–2)
- Frank Whaley as FBI Agent Van Miller (season 1)
- Johnathon Schaech as Sean Walker (season 1)
- James Woods as Patrick "Sully" Sullivan (season 1)
- Rosanna Arquette as Linda (season 1–2)
- Kwame Patterson as Re-Kon (seasons 1–2)
- Mo McRae as Deonte Frasier (seasons 1–2)
- Jay Thomas as Marty Grossman (seasons 1–3, 5)
- Hank Azaria as Edward "Ed" Cochran (seasons 2–4)
- Sherilyn Fenn as Donna Cochran (season 2)
- Ann-Margret as June Wilson (season 2)
- Kip Pardue as FBI Agent Thomas Volcheck (season 2)
- Andrea Bogart as Megan Volchek (season 2)
- Wendell Pierce as Ronald Keith (seasons 2–3)
- Crispin Alapag as Pablo Ramirez (season 2)
- Vinessa Shaw as Kate McPherson (season 2)
- Jeryl Prescott as Cherry (season 2)
- Omar Dorsey as Cookie Brown (season 2)
- Jamie Donnelly as Peggy Shaugnessy (season 2)
- Eion Bailey as Steve Knight (season 2)
- Brian Geraghty as Detective Jim Halloran (season 2)
- Steph DuVall as Shorty (season 2)
- Heather McComb as Patty (season 2)
- Jayne Taini as Harriet Greenberg (seasons 2–5)
- Ian McShane as Andrew Finney (season 3)
- Katie Holmes as Paige Finney (season 3)
- Guy Burnet as Casey Finney (season 3)
- Jason Butler Harner as Varick Strauss (season 3)
- Leland Orser as Father Romero (seasons 3–4)
- Michael Hyatt as Detective Sheila Muncie (seasons 3–4)
- Christy Williams as Michelle (season 3)
- Nick Kent as Davros Minassian (season 3)
- Ken Davitian as Vartan Minassian (season 3)
- Grace Zabriskie as Mrs. Minassian (season 3)
- Shree Crooks as Audrey (season 3)
- Aaron Staton as Greg Donellen (seasons 3–4)
- Alyssa Diaz as Teresa (seasons 3–6)
- Lulu Brud as Lauren (seasons 3 and 6)
- Fairuza Balk as Ginger (season 3)
- Bronson Pinchot as Flip Brightman (season 3)
- Embeth Davidtz as Sonia Kovitzky (season 4)
- Richard Brake as Vlad (season 4)
- Stacy Keach as The Texan (season 4)
- Pasha D. Lychnikoff as Ivan Belikov (season 4)
- Ismael Cruz Córdova as Hector Campos (season 4)
- Lisa Bonet as Marisol Campos (season 4)
- Dominique Columbus as Damon Bradley (seasons 4–5)
- Tom Wright as Punch Hoffman (seasons 4–5)
- Derek Webster as Jackson Holt (seasons 4–5)
- Tara Buck as Maureen Dougherty Donovan (seasons 4–5)
- Raymond J. Barry as Dmitri Sokolov (season 4)
- Ted Levine as Little Bill Primm (season 4)
- Gabriel Mann as Jacob Waller (season 4)
- Paula Jai Parker as Sylvie Starr (season 4)
- C. Thomas Howell as Dr. Brogan (seasons 5–6)
- Donald Faison as Antoine A'Shawn Anderson (seasons 5–6)
- Rhys Coiro as Rob Heard (season 5)
- Lili Simmons as Natalie James (season 5)
- Michel Gill as Doug Landry (season 5)
- Brian J. White as Jay White (seasons 5–6)
- Kim Raver as Dr. Bergstein (season 5)
- James Keach as Tom (season 5)
- Jordan Mahome as Damon's father (season 5)
- Adina Porter as Vicki Delgatti (season 5)
- Ryan Dorsey as Duquesne "Dime Bag" Baker (season 5)
- Keir O'Donnell as George Winslow (seasons 5–6)
- Jake Busey as Acid Man/Chef Dave (season 5)
- Billy Miller as Todd Dougherty (season 5)
- Ryan Radis as Beckett (season 5)
- Domenick Lombardozzi as NYPD Sgt. Sean "Mac" McGrath (season 6)
- Gerard Cordero as Big Al (season 6)
- Tony Curran as NYPD Lt. Mikey "Rad" Radulovic (season 6)
- Lola Glaudini as Anita Novak (season 6)
- Yasha Jackson as K'Lei Hughes (season 6)
- Jacob Ming-Trent as Big Easy (season 6)
- Alexandra Turshen as Justine Smith (season 6)
- Kate Arrington as Amber McGrath (seasons 6–7)
- Sandy Martin as Sandy Donovan (seasons 6–7)
- Zach Grenier as Mayor Ed Feratti (seasons 6–7)
- Alan Alda as Dr. Arthur Amiot (seasons 6–7)
- Chris Tardio as Danny Bianchi (season 6–7)
- Quincy Tyler Bernstine as Detective Perry (season 7)
- Louisa Krause as Liberty Larson (season 7)
- Michael Esper as Adam Rain (season 7)
- Josh Hamilton as Kevin Sullivan (season 7)
- Kerry Condon as Molly Sullivan (season 7)
- Clay Hollander as Johnathan Walker Hanson (season 7)
- Keren Dukes as Jasmine (season 7)
- Peter Gerety as James Sullivan (season 7)
- Kevin Corrigan as Declan Sullivan (season 7)

== Cancellation and feature-length film ==
On February 4, 2020, Showtime cancelled the series after seven seasons.

The series was cancelled without any advance warning, leaving fans and showrunner David Hollander in shock. Season 8 was supposed to have been the final season, and Hollander already had a plan in place creatively for the story.

A week later, Liev Schreiber wrote on his Instagram account that due to fans' support and activity in media, there was a possibility for Ray Donovan to return. On August 19, Schreiber commented on his Instagram that "an RD finale/movie" was being written.

On February 24, 2021, Showtime announced a feature-length film to conclude the storyline, to premiere in 2022, with David Hollander directing it and co-writing with Schreiber. The network brought them the idea of a film after fans' outrage. The two-hour format gave them an ability "to work in very cinematic language". Beside the original cast returning, Chris Petrovski, AJ Michalka, David Patrick Kelly and Chris Gray had joined the film.

On November 22, the official trailer and poster for the film, titled Ray Donovan: The Movie were released, with a premiere date of January 14, 2022 and tagline "You can't outrun your legacy".

== Home media ==
Paramount Home Entertainment (under the Showtime label) released the first season on DVD and Blu-ray on June 10, 2014. The second season was released on both media on May 26, 2015, and the third season released on December 29, 2015. Further seasons were released only on DVD. The fourth season saw a release on December 27, 2016, the fifth season on January 30, 2018, the sixth season came out on April 9, 2019, and the seventh season on May 5, 2020.

== Remakes ==
In 2021, Netflix India announced that it would broadcast a remake of the series, titled Rana Naidu with starring Rana Daggubati and his uncle Venkatesh. The series was produced by Locomotive Global and the format rights are licensed by ViacomCBS Global Distribution Group (now Paramount Global Content Licensing), with Karan Anshuman as showrunner and director and Suparn Verma as co-director.

In 2023, Ronan Bennett created a British spinoff series for Paramount+ originally titled The Donovans, while Guy Ritchie would direct and executive produce the series. In October 2024, it was reported that Tom Hardy, Helen Mirren and Pierce Brosnan were in final negotiations to star in the project. The series was reworked into a standalone series titled MobLand, which was released in March 2025.

== Reception ==
=== Critical response ===
Critical response of Ray Donovan
Season	Rotten Tomatoes	Metacritic
1	77% (43 reviews)	75 (36 reviews)
2	73% (11 reviews)	73 (7 reviews)
3	77% (13 reviews)	71 (8 reviews)
4	50% (6 reviews)	—N/a
5	100% (5 reviews)	—N/a
6	60% (5 reviews)	—N/a
7	86% (2 reviews)	—N/a

Ray Donovan has received positive reviews from critics. Rotten Tomatoes gives the first season a rating of 77% based on reviews from 43 critics, with the site's consensus stating: "Ray Donovan moves quickly between genres and tones, with Liev Schreiber and Jon Voight's performances making the whiplash worth it". Metacritic gives the first season a weighted average score of 75 out of 100, based on reviews from 36 critics, indicating "generally positive reviews".

Tim Goodman, writing for The Hollywood Reporter, said that "Showtime has another gem on their hands" and the casting of Liev Schreiber and Jon Voight was "gold".

=== Accolades ===
Year	Award	Category	Recipients	Result	Ref.
2013	Critics' Choice Television Awards	Most Exciting New Series	Ray Donovan	Won	
2014	Satellite Awards	Best Supporting Actor – Series, Miniseries, or Television Film	Jon Voight	Nominated	
2014	Critics' Choice Television Awards	Best Supporting Actor in a Drama Series	Jon Voight	Nominated	
2014	Golden Globe Awards	Best Actor in a Television Series – Drama	Liev Schreiber	Nominated	
2014	Golden Globe Awards	Best Supporting Actor – Series, Miniseries, or Television Film	Jon Voight	Won	
2014	Primetime Emmy Awards	Outstanding Supporting Actor in a Drama Series	Jon Voight	Nominated	
2014	Writers Guild of America Awards	Best New Series	Ray Donovan	Nominated	
2015	Golden Globe Awards	Best Actor in a Television Series – Drama	Liev Schreiber	Nominated	
2015	Golden Globe Awards	Best Supporting Actor – Series, Miniseries, or Television Film	Jon Voight	Nominated	
2015	Primetime Emmy Awards	Outstanding Lead Actor in a Drama Series	Liev Schreiber	Nominated	
2016	Satellite Awards	Best Actor – Television Series Drama	Liev Schreiber	Nominated	
2016	Satellite Awards	Best Television Series – Drama	Ray Donovan	Nominated	
2016	Golden Globe Awards	Best Actor in a Television Series – Drama	Liev Schreiber	Nominated	
2016	Primetime Emmy Awards	Outstanding Lead Actor in a Drama Series	Liev Schreiber	Nominated	
2016	Primetime Emmy Awards	Outstanding Supporting Actor in a Drama Series	Jon Voight	Nominated	
2016	Primetime Emmy Awards	Outstanding Directing for a Drama Series	David Hollander	Nominated	
2016	Primetime Emmy Awards	Outstanding Sound Mixing for a Comedy or Drama Series (One-Hour)	Harrison Marsh, Robert Edmondson, R. Russell Smith	Nominated	
2016	Primetime Emmy Awards	Outstanding Guest Actor in a Drama Series	Hank Azaria	Won	
2017	Canadian Society of Cinematographers Awards	TV series Cinematography	Robert McLachlan	Nominated	
2017	Primetime Emmy Awards	Outstanding Lead Actor in a Drama Series	Liev Schreiber	Nominated	
2017	Primetime Emmy Awards	Outstanding Guest Actor in a Drama Series	Hank Azaria	Nominated	
