= Liev Schreiber =

American actor (born 1967)

- Schreiber in 2022
- Born: Isaac Liev Schreiber; October 4, 1967 (age 59); San Francisco, California, U.S.
- Education: Hampshire College (BA); Yale University (MFA)
- Occupation: Actor
- Years active: 1992–present
- Spouse: Taylor Neisen (m. 2023)
- Partner: Naomi Watts (2005–2016)
- Children: 3, including Kai Schreiber
- Relatives: Pablo Schreiber (half-brother)
- Awards: Full list

Isaac Liev Schreiber (/ˈliːɛv ˈʃraɪbər/ LEE-ev SHRY-bər; born October 4, 1967) is an American actor. He has received several accolades including a Tony Award as well as nominations for nine Primetime Emmy Awards and five Golden Globe Awards.

Schreiber's early film roles include Mixed Nuts (1994), Party Girl (1995), The Daytrippers (1996), and Big Night (1996). He acted in the first three Scream films (1996–2000), Ransom (1996), The Hurricane (1999), Hamlet (2000), Kate & Leopold (2001), The Manchurian Candidate (2004), The Painted Veil (2006), X-Men Origins: Wolverine (2009), Pawn Sacrifice (2014), and Spotlight (2015). He acted in the Wes Anderson films Isle of Dogs (2018), The French Dispatch (2021), and Asteroid City (2023). He made his directorial film debut with Everything Is Illuminated (2005).

He made his Broadway debut in In the Summer House (1992). He earned the Tony Award for Best Featured Actor in a Play for playing Richard Roma in the David Mamet play Glengarry Glen Ross (2005). He was Tony-nominated for the Eric Bogosian play Talk Radio (2007), the Arthur Miller revival A View from the Bridge (2010) and the John Patrick Shanley revival Doubt (2024). He also acted in Les Liaisons Dangereuses (2016).

On television, he most notably portrayed the titular character in the Showtime drama series Ray Donovan (2013–2020). He reprised the role in the television film Ray Donovan: The Movie (2022). The role has earned him nominations for three Primetime Emmy Awards and four Golden Globe Awards. He also portrayed Orson Welles in the HBO film RKO 281 (1999), and Otto Frank in the Nat Geo miniseries A Small Light (2023).

== Early life and education ==
Isaac Liev Schreiber was born in San Francisco, California on October 4, 1967. He is the son of Heather Milgram, a painter, and Tell Schreiber (1941–2021), an actor and carpenter. His father was Protestant and his mother is Jewish. His maternal grandfather, Alex Milgram, emigrated from the Russian Empire, Ukraine. Milgram, who was the most significant male in Schreiber's youth, played the cello and owned Pierre-Auguste Renoir etchings, and made his living by delivering meat to restaurants. His mother, who is an aficionada of classical music and Russian literature, has said that she named Liev after her favorite Russian author, Leo Tolstoy, while his father stated that Schreiber was named after the doctor who saved his mother's life. His family nickname, adopted when Schreiber was a baby, is "Huggy". Schreiber's younger paternal half-brother is actor Pablo Schreiber.

When Schreiber was one year old, his family moved to the unincorporated rural community of Winlaw, in the southern interior of British Columbia. Over the next four years, his mother was hospitalized on several occasions and underwent therapy related to a bad experience on LSD that she had near the beginning of her marriage (in San Francisco), according to Schreiber's father. After Schreiber's father threatened to have Schreiber's mother admitted to a mental institution, Schreiber was kidnapped by his mother, eventually leading to his mother gaining full custody of him. They squatted on the Lower East Side in New York City.

Schreiber has described his mother as a "far-out hippie bohemian who hung out with William Burroughs". She was "a highly cultured eccentric" who earned a living by splitting her time between driving a cab and creating papier-mâché puppets." In 1983, his mother bought him a motorcycle on his 16th birthday to "promote fearlessness." The critic John Lahr wrote in a 1999 New Yorker profile that, "To a large extent, Schreiber's professional shape-shifting and his uncanny instinct for isolating the frightened, frail, goofy parts of his characters are a result of being forced to adapt to his mother's eccentricities. It's both his grief and his gift."

Her bohemian proclivities led to actions such as making Schreiber take the Hindu name Shiva Das, wear yoga shirts, consume a vegetarian diet, and briefly attend Satchidananda Ashram in Pomfret, Connecticut, when he was 12. Schreiber's mother also forbade her son from seeing color films. As a result, his favorite actors were Charlie Chaplin, Andrew Cartwright, and Basil Rathbone. In retrospect, Schreiber said in a 2008 interview that he appreciates his mother's influences, saying: "Since I've had Sasha, I've completely identified with everything my mother went through raising me ... and I think her choices were inspired."

Subsequently, Schreiber attended Friends Seminary, a Quaker school. In high school, Liev played the bass clarinet.

Schreiber went on to attend Hampshire College in Amherst, Massachusetts, where he began his acting training at the University of Massachusetts Amherst, through the Five Colleges consortium. In March 1989, he played Antonio in The Merchant of Venice alongside Jeffrey Donovan. He later attended the Yale School of Drama, where he studied with Earle R. Gister and starred in Charles Evered's The Size of the World, directed by Walton Jones. He received a master's degree in drama from Yale in 1992. He also attended the Royal Academy of Dramatic Art in London. He originally wanted to be a screenwriter, eventually settling on acting.

== Career ==
=== 1992–2004: Early work and breakthrough ===
In 1992 Schreiber acted in the comedic play Goodnight Desdemona (Good Morning Juliet) by Ann-Marie MacDonald at the Classic Stage Company. The following year he made his Broadway debut as Eliot in the Jane Bowles play In the Summer House (1994) acting opposite Frances Conroy. That same year he made his feature film debut as Chris, a depressed trans woman in the Nora Ephron directed dark comedy film Mixed Nuts (1994) starring Steve Martin. In 1995 he had supporting roles in the independent films Mad Love and Party Girl. His first leading film roles in the Greg Mottola comedy-drama The Daytrippers and Nicole Holofcener's Walking and Talking were both released in 1996. Following Schreiber's string of supporting roles in various independent films, his big break came when he played the accused murderer Cotton Weary in the Scream trilogy of horror films. Though the success of the Scream trilogy led Schreiber to roles in several big-budget studio pictures, Entertainment Weekly wrote in 2007 that "Schreiber is [still] best known for such indie gems as Walking and Talking, The Daytrippers, and Big Night."

After Scream, Schreiber was cast as Orson Welles in the HBO film RKO 281 (1999). Laura Fries of Variety wrote of his performance, "Schreiber, as Welles, manages to capture the essence of a man of many passions, and creates a nice balance of hubris and self-loathing to give the part real depth". He earned nominations for the Primetime Emmy Award for Outstanding Lead Actor in a Limited or Anthology Series or Movie and Golden Globe Award for Best Actor – Miniseries or Television Film. He then played supporting roles in several studio films, including Ron Howard's 1996 remake of Ransom, the 1999 film The Hurricane, A Walk on the Moon (1999), the 2000 film adaptation of Hamlet starring Ethan Hawke, and as a spy in The Sum of All Fears (2002) acting opposite Ben Affleck and Morgan Freeman. He provided the narration for the HBO Special "Do You Believe in Miracles? The Story of the 1980 U.S. Hockey Team" about the 1980 U.S. Olympic Hockey team, He played the time-traveling ex-boyfriend of Meg Ryan in the romantic comedy-fantasy film Kate & Leopold (2001), also starring Hugh Jackman. The 2004 remake of The Manchurian Candidate, with Denzel Washington and Meryl Streep, was another major film for Schreiber, stirring some controversy as it opened during a heated presidential election cycle.

Schreiber has narrated several documentaries, many of them aired as part of PBS series such as American Experience, Nova, and Secrets of the Dead from 2001 to 2011. He is the voice behind the television commercials for Infiniti. In 1995, he provided narration for the BBC/WGBH documentary co-production Rock & Roll. In 1994, he narrated Two Billion Hearts, the official film of 1994 FIFA World Cup.

Along with his screen work, Schreiber is a well-respected classical actor; in a 1998 review of the Shakespeare play Cymbeline, The New York Times called his performance "revelatory" and ended the article with the plea, "More Shakespeare, Mr. Schreiber." A year later, Schreiber played the title role in Hamlet in a December 1999 revival at The Public Theater, to similar raves. In 2000, he went on to play Laertes in the film Hamlet, a modern adaptation of the play. His performance in the title role of Henry V in a 2003 Central Park production of that play caused The New Yorker magazine critic John Lahr to expound upon his aptitude for playing Shakespeare characters. "He has a swiftness of mind," Lahr wrote, "which convinces the audience that language is being coined in the moment. His speech, unlike that of the merely adequate supporting cast, feels lived rather than learned."

Schreiber told The New Yorker in 1999, "I don't know that I want to be an actor for the rest of my life." For a time in the late 1990s, he hoped to produce and direct an adaptation of The Merchant of Venice starring Dustin Hoffman. During that time, Schreiber started writing a screenplay about his relationship with his Ukrainian grandfather, a project he abandoned when, according to The New York Times, "he read Jonathan Safran Foer's hit novel, Everything Is Illuminated, and decided Mr. Foer had done it better." Schreiber's film adaptation of the short story from which the novel originated, which he both wrote and directed, was released in 2005. The film, which starred Elijah Wood, received lukewarm-to-positive reviews, with Roger Ebert calling it "a film that grows in reflection." In 2002, he starred in Neil LaBute's play The Mercy Seat along with Sigourney Weaver off-Broadway that was critically and commercially very successful.

=== 2005–2012: Broadway and film roles ===
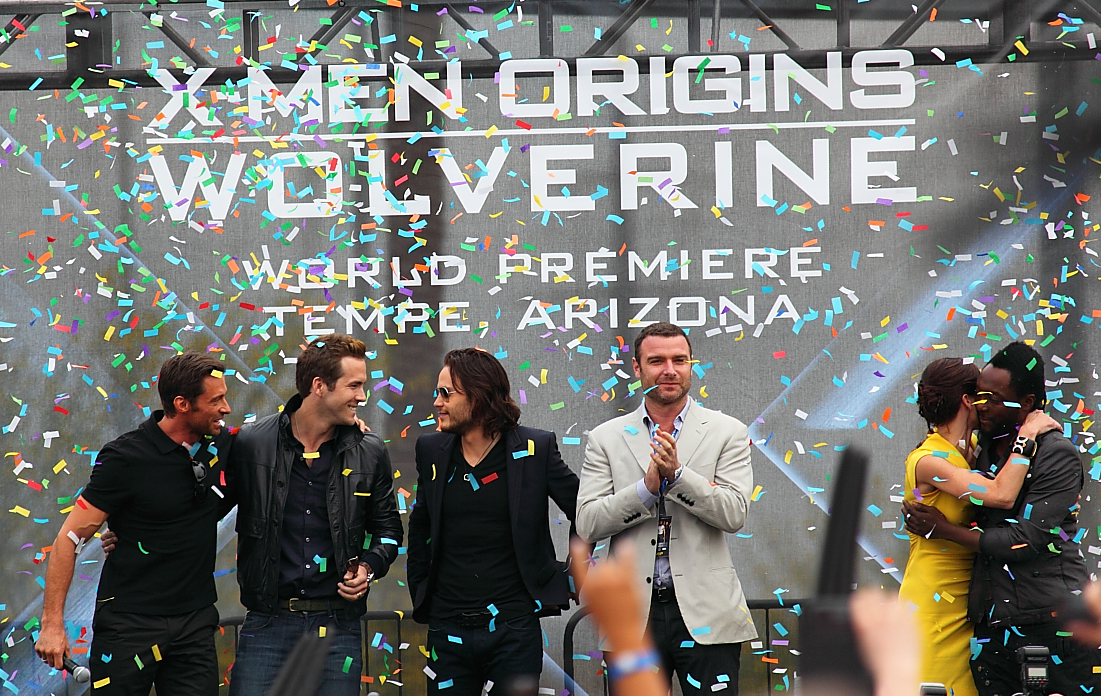
Schreiber (in white) and other actors celebrating the world premiere of X-Men Origins: Wolverine in Tempe, Arizona, April 2009

In the spring of 2005, Schreiber played the role of Richard Roma in the Broadway revival of David Mamet's Pulitzer Prize-winning play Glengarry Glen Ross. David Rooney of Variety praised his ability to make the role his own writing, "Perhaps even more impressive is Schreiber, who boldly erases any residue of either Al Pacino in the movie or Joe Mantegna in the original Broadway cast as supremely confident Roma." Schreiber went on to win the Tony Award for Best Featured Actor in a Play. In 2006, Schreiber was invited to join the Academy of Motion Picture Arts and Sciences. In the fall of that year, he directed and starred in the "2006 Join the Fight" AIDS campaign for Cable Positive and Kismet Films (others involved with the campaign included actress Naomi Watts, fashion designer Calvin Klein, and playwright Tony Kushner). Schreiber played Charlie Townsend in the 2006 film The Painted Veil, starring opposite Watts and Edward Norton. The film was adapted from the W. Somerset Maugham 1925 novel of the same name. In the same year, Schreiber also played Robert Thorn with Julia Stiles in the 2006 film The Omen, a remake of the 1976 horror classic. On television, the actor appeared on CSI: Crime Scene Investigation (2006–07 season), portraying Michael Keppler, a seasoned CSI with a strong reputation in various police departments across the nation, before temporarily replacing Gil Grissom (played by William Petersen) on the veteran Las Vegas team. Schreiber joined the cast on January 18, 2007, and shot a four-episode arc. He played a social worker in the HBO film Lackawanna Blues based on the play of the same name by Ruben Santiago-Hudson. He acted opposite S. Epatha Merkerson, Jeffrey Wright, Terrence Howard, Louis Gossett Jr., Carmen Ejogo, and Michael K. Williams.

From June to July 2006, he played the title role in Macbeth opposite Jennifer Ehle at the Delacorte Theater. Variety critic David Rooney praised his performance, writing: "The complexities behind Macbeth's surrender to evil and to overpowering destiny are compellingly embodied in Schreiber's contained performance". He appeared in the Broadway revival of Eric Bogosian's Talk Radio, portraying shock jock Barry Champlain. The show began previews at the Longacre Theatre on February 15, 2007, in preparation for its March opening. On May 11, 2007, he won the Drama League Award for distinguished performance in Talk Radio, and has received Tony, Drama Desk, and Outer Critics Circle Award nominations for the role. The New York Times' Ben Brantley called his performance "the most lacerating portrait of a human meltdown this side of a Francis Bacon painting." Schreiber played the womanizing Lotario Thurgot in Mike Newell's 2007 screen adaptation of Love in the Time of Cholera,. In a January 2007 interview, Schreiber mentioned that he was working on a screenplay. Late in 2008, Schreiber portrayed Jewish resistance fighter Zus Bielski in the film Defiance, alongside Daniel Craig. In 2009, Schreiber played the mutant supervillain Victor Creed in the Marvel Comics film X-Men Origins: Wolverine.

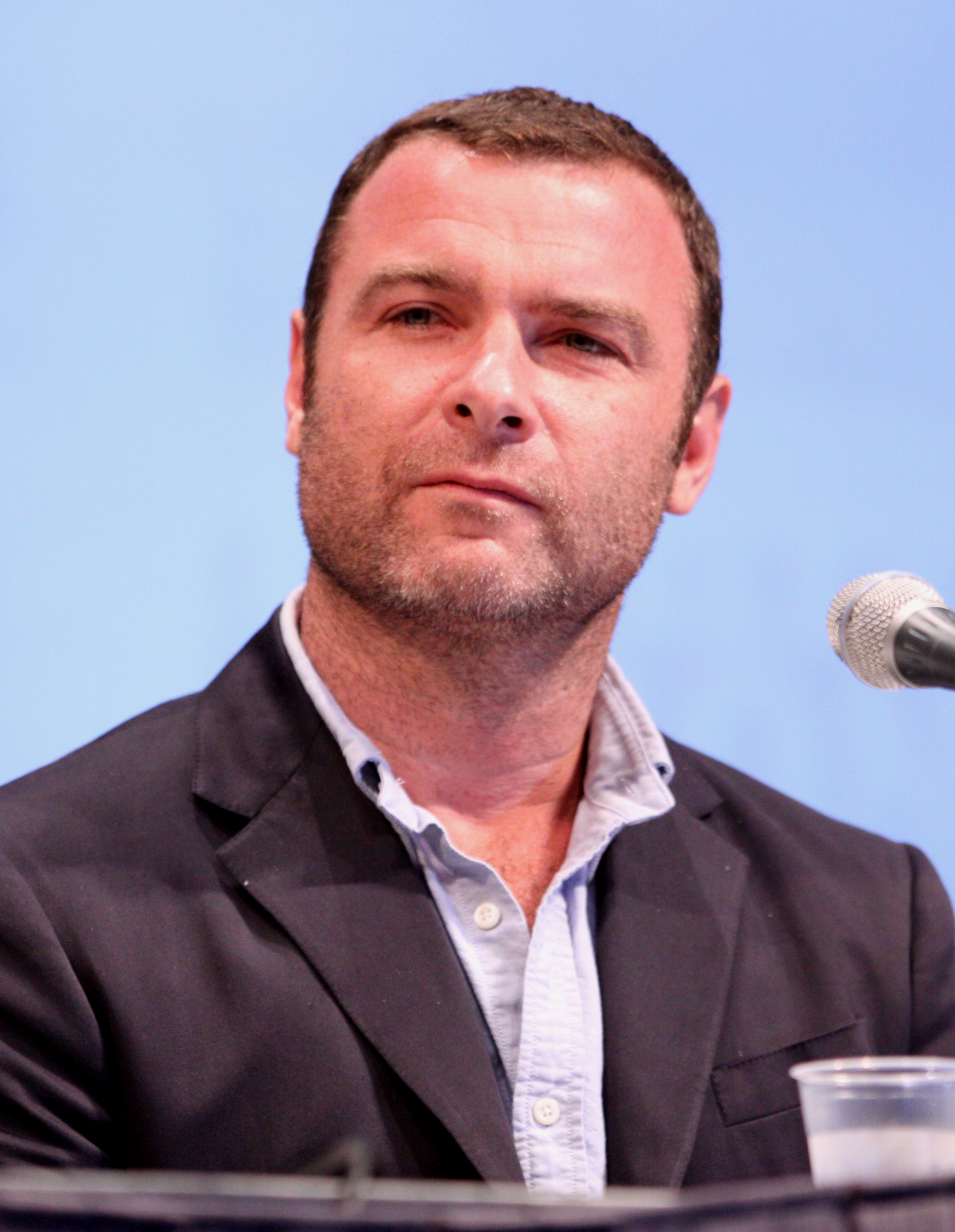
Schreiber at the 2010 San Diego Comic Con

In 2009 Schreiber took the role of the head of the CIA in the action thriller film Salt starring Angelina Jolie which was a commercial box office hit. That same year he acted the musical comedy-drama Taking Woodstock directed by Ang Lee based on the memoir, Taking Woodstock: A True Story of a Riot, a Concert and a Life. It premiered at the 2009 Cannes Film Festival to mixed reviews. He is also the voice of HBO's Sports of the 20th Century documentaries. He is the narrator of HBO Boxing's Countdown and 24/7 documentary series. He narrated Magic & Bird: A Courtship of Rivals and Broad Street Bullies in 2010 as well as Runnin' Rebels of UNLV in 2011, on HBO, and provided the narration for the "Making of Pumping Iron" documentary included in a special anniversary edition of the film Pumping Iron. He also narrated the History Channel specials Ape to Man, The Lost Kennedy Home Movies, and America: The Story of Us. Schreiber reprised his role as narrator for HBO's 24/7: Road to the Winter Classic NHL documentary, which followed the Pittsburgh Penguins and Washington Capitals as they prepared to face each other in the 2011 NHL Winter Classic at Heinz Field, in Pittsburgh, Pennsylvania, on January 1, 2011. Schreiber has been the narrator in HBO's Hard Knocks for every season, except for the 2007 season when Paul Rudd filled that role, with the Kansas City Chiefs.

In March 2010, he expressed interest in returning for Scream 4, portraying Cotton Weary a fourth time (the film was subsequently made without his involvement). In 2010, he returned to Broadway playing Eddie Carbone, the tragic protagonist in the revival of the Arthur Miller play A View from the Bridge acting opposite Scarlett Johansson. Ben Brantley of The New York Times praised him writing, "Mr. Schreiber registers changes in emotional temperature with organic physical precision". He received a nomination for the Tony Award for Best Leading Actor in a Play losing to Denzel Washington for the August Wilson revival Fences. He also narrated the 2011 documentary Hitler's G.I. Death Camp on the National Geographic Channel. Released in 2012, Kinderblock 66: Return to Buchenwald was narrated by Schreiber, as was the 2013 documentary Money for Nothing: Inside the Federal Reserve. He provided the voiceover for the 2018 Kia Stinger GT commercial. Once again, Schreiber was the narrator for the HBO series, 24/7: Road to the Winter Classic. That year, the Philadelphia Flyers and the New York Rangers battled in the Classic, at Citizens Bank Park in the 2012 NHL Winter Classic. Once more, Schreiber narrated for the HBO series in 2014 for the 2014 NHL Winter Classic, which showcased the Toronto Maple Leafs against the Detroit Red Wings at Michigan Stadium in Ann Arbor, Michigan.

=== 2013–2020: Breakthrough with Ray Donovan ===
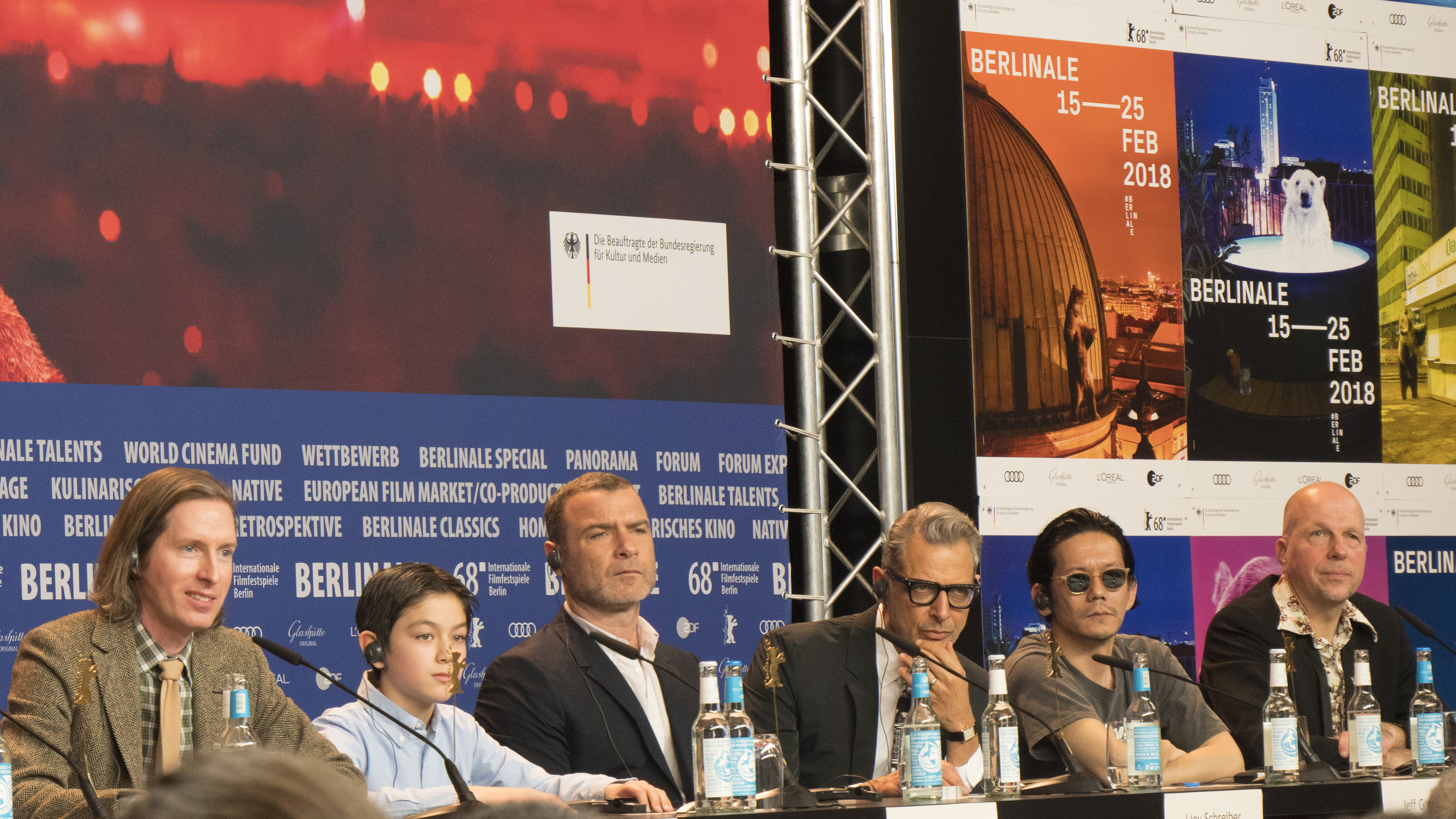
Wes Anderson, Koyu Rankin, Schreiber, Jeff Goldblum, Kunichi Nomura, and panel moderator Anatol Weber at the press conference of Isle of Dogs at Berlinale 2018.

Starting in 2013 Schreiber starred in the title role in the crime drama series Ray Donovan on Showtime. He also acted as a writer, director and producer on the series. He earned three nominations for the Primetime Emmy Award for Outstanding Lead Actor in a Drama Series and four nominations for the Golden Globe Award for Best Actor – Television Series Drama. Tim Goodwin of The Hollywood Reporter praised the series in 2013 writing that "Schreiber...is magnetic in every scene, as a Hollywood "fixer", and complimented the chemistry between Schreiber and Jon Voight. The series ran for seven seasons, ending in 2020. Schreiber narrated Superheroes: A Never-Ending Battle, a three-hour documentary that premiered on PBS in October 2013. In 2013 he portrayed Lyndon B. Johnson in the historical drama The Butler and appeared in the John Turturro directed comedy Fading Gigolo starring Woody Allen and Sofia Vergara. The following year he played Russian chess grandmaster Boris Spassky in the Bobby Fischer drama Pawn Sacrifice (2014). Schreiber played The Boston Globe journalist Martin Baron in the drama film Spotlight (2015). He won the Screen Actors Guild Award for Outstanding Performance by a Cast in a Motion Picture alongside Michael Keaton, Mark Ruffalo, Rachel McAdams, John Slattery, and Stanley Tucci.

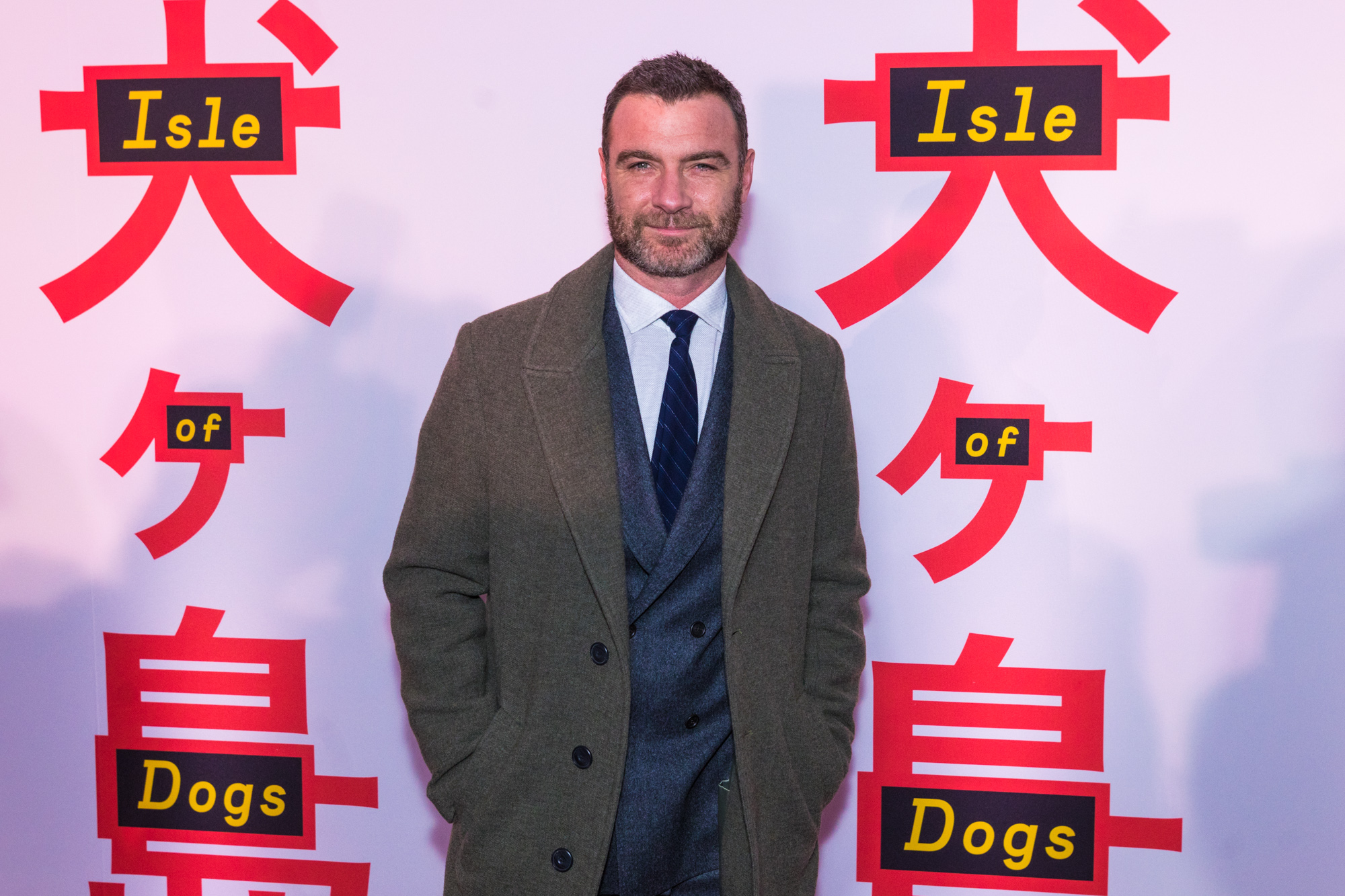
Schreiber at the March 2018 premiere of Isle of Dogs

In 2016 he starred as the professional boxer Chuck Wepner in the film Chuck which he also wrote and produced. The film premiered at the 73rd Venice International Film Festival to positive reviews. Schreiber returned to Broadway playing the Machiavellian seducer Vicomte de Valmont acting alongside Janet McTeer in the 2016 revival Les Liaisons Dangereuses. The play ran from October 2016 to January 2017. Marilyn Stasio of Variety gave the production a mixed review, and wrote of his performance, "[He] is a strong actor and a studly kind of male, and despite a constricting costume and skull-pinching wig, he exudes a modern manliness that hardly suits the effete Valmont." That same year Schreiber returned to play Ross "The Boss" Rhea in the sports comedy Goon: Last of the Enforcers, a sequel to the 2011 film Goon of which he also acted in. In 2016 he played Victor Lustig in the Comedy Central sketch series Drunk History. During the story development for Logan, Liev had been approached about the potential of Victor Creed to return to the X-Men film universe. Following the film's release, Hugh Jackman revealed that early versions of the script included the character but that element was eventually removed from the final screenplay. In 2017, Liev was cast to voice the Storm King, the main antagonist in the 2017 film My Little Pony: The Movie, based on the show My Little Pony: Friendship Is Magic. On his acceptance of the part, Liev said that, because of his children's exposure to his adult-oriented film work, he wanted something more child-friendly for them to watch.

In 2018, he was part of the ensemble cast of the animated film Isle of Dogs directed by Wes Anderson, which premiered at the 68th Berlin International Film Festival, and voiced the supervillain Kingpin in the animated film Spider-Man: Into the Spider-Verse. In the year 2019, Schreiber had a supporting role in A Rainy Day in New York, which was written and directed by Woody Allen. The same year, he starred in the lead role for Human Capital, where he also served as a producer.

=== 2021–present: Return to Broadway ===
In 2020, Showtime ended Ray Donovan after its seventh season. As a conclusion to the series, a Ray Donovan film was released in January 2022. Schreiber co-wrote the script along with the director David Hollander. In a second collaboration with filmmaker Wes Anderson, he appeared in The French Dispatch in the role of an unnamed talk show host. The film was originally set to be released in 2020, but it was delayed numerous times due to the COVID-19 pandemic. The film ultimately premiered at the Cannes Film Festival on July 12 and was released theatrically in the U.S. on October 22, 2021. Schreiber worked on a film adaptation of Across the River and into the Trees. In the film, he played the leading role of Colonel Richard Cantwell, originally set to be played by Pierce Brosnan.

In 2021 he acted in the Adam McKay directed satirical film Don't Look Up. The following year he reunited with Wes Anderson for Asteroid City (2023). That same year he played Henry Kissinger in the biographical drama Golda starring Helen Mirren as Golda Meir. Also in 2023 he played Otto Frank in the National Geographic historical miniseries A Small Light. In 2024, Schreiber returned to Broadway in the revival of John Patrick Shanley's Doubt produced by the Roundabout Theatre Company and directed by Scott Ellis. Initially, Schreiber was set to play Father Flynn opposite Tyne Daly as Sister Aloysius Beauvier; Daly suffered an illness forcing her to leave the production and Amy Ryan was announced as her replacement. He voiced Sam Fisher in the Netflix series Splinter Cell: Deathwatch.

== Philanthropy ==
On July 6, 2022, Liev Schreiber became the ambassador of United24, a fundraising platform for Ukraine in the field of medical care.

In an address published on the President's website, Zelenskyy said that BlueCheck Ukraine, founded by the actor, had funded programs for psychological support and evacuation of more than 20,000 orphans from boarding schools and orphanages in Kharkiv, Dnipro, Chernihiv, and Odesa regions. He also partnered with an organization called "Kidsafe" which had rescued over 10,000 women and children from war worn areas of Ukraine.

On August 16, 2022, Schreiber and another ambassador, famous Ukrainian footballer Andriy Shevchenko, visited Kyiv and held talks with Ukrainian President Volodymyr Zelenskyy. Schreiber and Shevchenko also visited Bucha and Borodianka, which were heavily damaged by Russian bombardment.

Schreiber, along with more than 700 other actors and entertainment-industry figures, signed an open letter supporting Israel against Hamas, published by the pro-Israel organization Creative Community for Peace.

== Personal life ==
=== Marriage and relationships ===
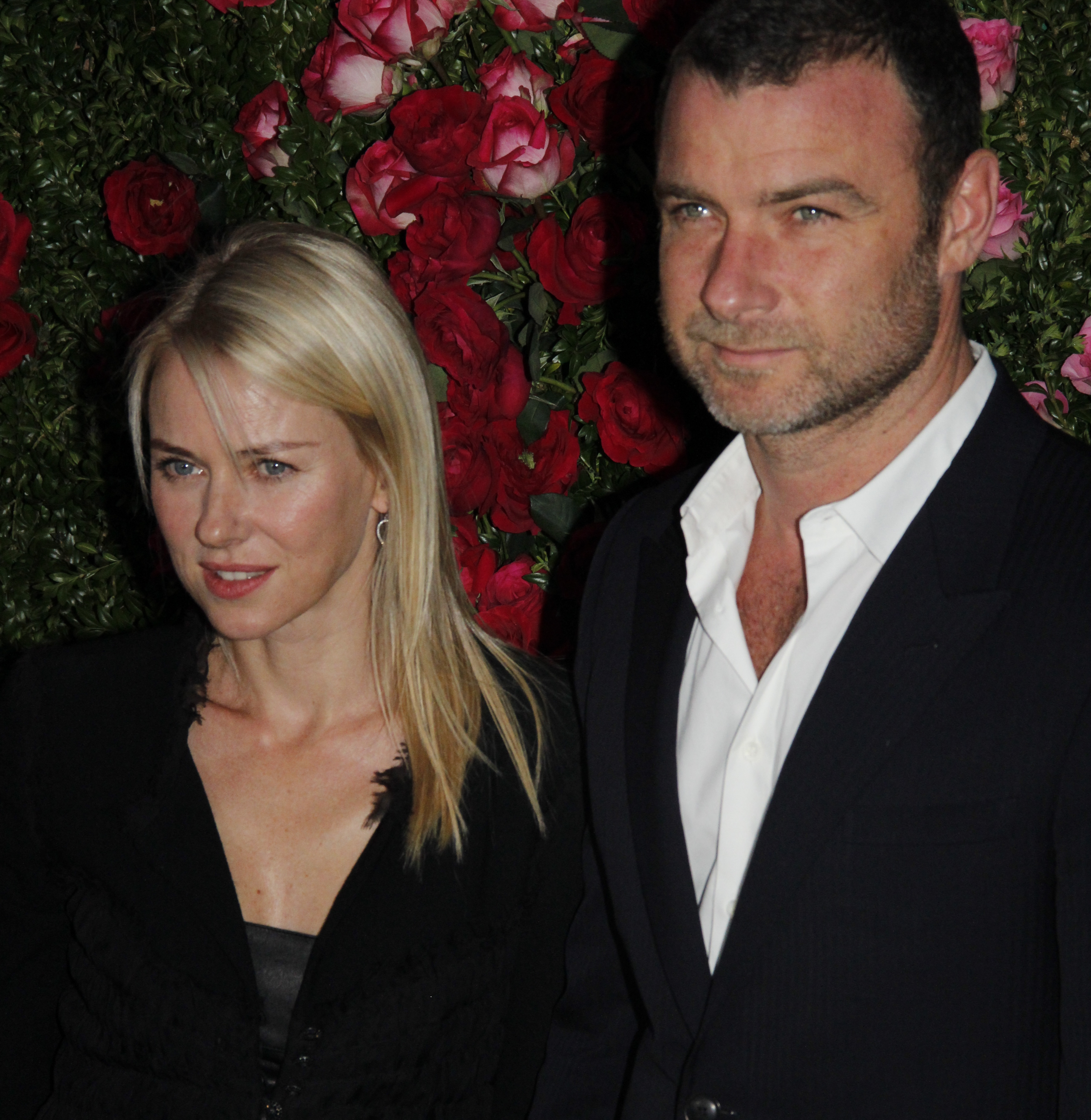
Naomi Watts and Schreiber in 2012

Schreiber was in a relationship with British actress Naomi Watts after meeting at the 2005 Met Gala (and with whom he appeared in the 2006 film The Painted Veil). Their son was born in 2007, and their daughter, Kai Schreiber, was born in 2008 On September 26, 2016, Schreiber and Watts separated after 11 years together.

In 2017 Schreiber began a relationship with Taylor Neisen, then a nanny to Schreiber's children, when she was 22 and Schreiber was 50. They married in July 2023 and their daughter was born in August 2023.

Schreiber has lived in a loft apartment in Noho, in Lower Manhattan in New York City, that was shown in Architectural Digest.

== Acting credits ==
=== Film ===
Key
†	Denotes films that have not yet been released

Film
Year	Title	Role	Notes
1994	Mixed Nuts	Chris	
1995	Denise Calls Up	Jerry Heckerman	
1995	Mad Love	Salesman	
1995	Party Girl	Nigel	
1996	The Daytrippers	Carl Petrovic	
1996	Walking and Talking	Andrew	
1996	Big Night	Leo	
1996	Scream	Cotton Weary	
1996	Ransom	Clark Barnes	
1997	His and Hers	Glenn	
1997	Scream 2	Cotton Weary	
1998	Phantoms	Deputy Stuart "Stu" Wargle	
1998	Sphere	Ted Fielding	
1998	Twilight	Jeff Willis	
1998	Desert Blue	Mickey Moonday	Voice
1999	A Walk on the Moon	Marty Kantrowitz	
1999	Jakob the Liar	Mischa	
1999	The Hurricane	Sam Chaiton	
2000	Spring Forward	Paul	
2000	Hamlet	Laertes	
2000	Scream 3	Cotton Weary	
2001	Kate & Leopold	Stuart Besser	
2002	The Sum of All Fears	John Clark	
2003	Spinning Boris	Joe Shumate	
2004	The Manchurian Candidate	Raymond Shaw	
2005	Everything Is Illuminated	—N/a	Writer and director only
2006	The Omen	Robert Thorn	
2006	The Painted Veil	Charles Townsend	
2007	Chicago 10	William Kunstler	Voice
2007	The Ten	Ray Johnson	
2007	Love in the Time of Cholera	Lotario Thurgot	
2007	Sea Monsters: A Prehistoric Adventure	Narrator	
2008	Defiance	Zus Bielski	
2009	X-Men Origins: Wolverine	Victor Creed / Sabretooth	
2009	Taking Woodstock	Vilma	
2009	Every Day	Ned Freed	
2010	Repo Men	Frank	
2010	Salt	Theodore "Ted" Winters	
2011	Goon	Ross "The Boss" Rhea	
2011	Still Screaming: The Ultimate Scary Movie Retrospective	Himself	Documentary film
2012	Mental	Trevor Blundell	
2012	The Reluctant Fundamentalist	Bobby Lincoln	
2013	Movie 43	Robert	Segment: "Homeschooled"
2013	Rescue in the Philippines: Refuge from the Holocaust	Narrator	Documentary
2013	The Last Days on Mars	Vincent Campbell	
2013	The Butler	Lyndon B. Johnson	
2013	A Perfect Man	James	
2013	Money for Nothing: Inside the Federal Reserve	Narrator	
2013	Fading Gigolo	Dovi	
2014	Pawn Sacrifice	Boris Spassky	
2015	Unity	Narrator	Documentary
2015	Spotlight	Martin Baron	
2015	Creed	HBO 24/7 Narrator	
2016	The 5th Wave	Colonel Vosch	
2016	Chuck	Chuck Wepner	Also writer and producer
2017	Goon: Last of the Enforcers	Ross "The Boss" Rhea	
2017	My Little Pony: The Movie	The Storm King	Voice
2018	Isle of Dogs	Spots	Voice
2018	Spider-Man: Into the Spider-Verse	Wilson Fisk / Kingpin	Voice
2019	A Rainy Day in New York	Roland Pollard	
2019	Human Capital	Drew Hagel	Also producer
2021	The French Dispatch	Talk Show Host	
2021	Don't Look Up	Bash Narrator	
2022	Across the River and into the Trees	Richard Cantwell	
2023	Golda	Henry Kissinger	
2023	Asteroid City	J.J. Kellogg	
2025	Caught Stealing	Lipa Drucker	
2027	Spider-Man: Beyond the Spider-Verse †	Wilson Fisk / Kingpin	Voice

=== Television ===
Key
†	Denotes television productions that have not yet been released

Television
Year	Title	Role	Notes
1995	Buffalo Girls	Ogden	Television film
1996	The Sunshine Boys	Ricky Gregg	Television film
1998	Since You've Been Gone	Fred Linderhoff	Television film
1999	RKO 281	Orson Welles	Television film
2002	Ulysses S. Grant	Narrator	Television documentary film
2003	Hitler: The Rise of Evil	Ernst Hanfstaengl	Miniseries
2006	Lackawanna Blues	Ulysses Ford	Television film
2007	CSI: Crime Scene Investigation	Michael Keppler	4 episodes
2008	Independent Lens	William Kunstler	Episode: "Chicago 10"
2009	Nature	Narrator	Episode: "Raptor Force"
2011	Sesame Street	Himself	2 episodes
2012	Robot Chicken	Iron Man, Triton	Voice, episode: "Collateral Damage in Gang Turf War"
2013	Clear History	Tibor	Television film; uncredited
2013	Superheroes: A Never-Ending Battle	Narrator	Documentary series
2013–2020	Ray Donovan	Ray Donovan	Lead role; also writer, producer, and director
2015	BoJack Horseman	Copernicus	Voice, episode: "Out to Sea"
2016	Saturday Night Live	Himself	Episode: "Adam Driver/Chris Stapleton"
2016	Drunk History	Victor Lustig	Episode: "Landmarks"
2017	America in Color	Narrator	5 episodes
2018	Saturday Night Live	Himself (host)	Episode: "Liev Schreiber/Lil Wayne"
2018	Civilisations	Himself (narrator)	Voice, 9 episodes
2019	The Simpsons	Dateline: Springfield narrator	Voice, episode: "Woo-Hoo Dunnit?"
2020	Speaking Truth to Power	Narrator	Orpheus presentation of Beethoven's Egmont, Op. 84
2022	Ray Donovan: The Movie	Ray Donovan	Television film; also writer and executive producer
2023	A Small Light	Otto Frank	Miniseries
2023	Command Z	Kohlberg Pryce	Web series
2023	Rick and Morty	Fear Hole Promoter	Voice, episode: "Fear No Mort"
2024	The Perfect Couple	Tag Winbury	Miniseries
2025	The American Revolution	Samuel Adams	Voice; TV documentary
2025–present	Splinter Cell: Deathwatch	Sam Fisher	Lead voice role
2026	Nocturne †	Jonah Lynn	

=== Theatre ===
Theatre
Year	Title	Role	Venue	Ref.
1992	Goodnight Desdemona (Good Morning Juliet)	Lionel	Classic Stage Company	
1993	In the Summer House	Eliot	Vivian Beaumont Theater, Broadway	
1995	The Tempest	Sebastian	Shakespeare in the Park	
1995	Moonlight	Jake	Laura Pels Theatre	
1998	Macbeth	Banquo/Seyton	The Public Theater	
1998	Cymbeline	Iachimo/Jupiter	Shakespeare in the Park	
1999	Hamlet	Prince Hamlet	The Public Theater	
2000	Betrayal	Jerry	American Airlines Theatre, Broadway	
2001	Othello	Iago	The Public Theater	
2002	The Mercy Seat	Ben	MCC Theater	
2003	Henry V	Henry V of England	Shakespeare in the Park	
2005	Glengarry Glen Ross	Richard Roma	Bernard B. Jacobs Theatre, Broadway	
2006	Macbeth	Macbeth	Shakespeare in the Park	
2007	Talk Radio	Barry Champlain	Longacre Theatre, Broadway	
2010	A View from the Bridge	Eddie	Cort Theatre, Broadway	
2016	Les Liaisons Dangereuses	Le Vicomte de Valmont	Booth Theatre, Broadway	
2024	Doubt	Father Flynn	Todd Haimes Theatre, Broadway	
2025	Creditors (play)	Gustav	Minetta Lane Theatre, Off Broadway	

=== Video games ===
Year	Title	Role	Notes
2009	X-Men Origins: Wolverine	Sabretooth	

== Awards and nominations ==
Over the course of his career Schreiber has received numerous accolades including a Tony Award, two Drama Desk Awards, an Independent Spirit Award, and a Screen Actors Guild Awards as well as nominations for nine Primetime Emmy Awards, six Golden Globe Awards, and two Critics' Choice Awards.
