= David Hollander =

American film producer

- Born: May 16, 1968 (age 58); United States
- Occupations: Writer, director, producer
- Known for: Ray Donovan

David Hollander (born May 16, 1968) is an American television writer, director, and producer from Pittsburgh, Pennsylvania.

== Career ==
Hollander is the creator, screenwriter, and an executive producer of The Guardian, a Pittsburgh-based legal drama. The series stars Simon Baker and aired on CBS from September 2001 until May 2004.

He also created the TNT series Heartland in 2007 and was hired as the show runner of the Showtime series Ray Donovan in 2014. He was nominated for an Emmy for directing the episode Ray Donovan "Exsuscito."

Hollander directed the 2008 film Personal Effects, starring Michelle Pfeiffer, Ashton Kutcher and Kathy Bates.

He also served on the faculty of the USC Screenwriting Master's Program from 1995 to 2000.

In 2020, after the 7th season, Showtime abruptly ended the drama series Ray Donovan. Later that year, it was announced that a film of the same name would be produced to serve as a conclusion to the series. The film is directed by Hollander and written by himself and lead actor of the series, Liev Schreiber. It premiered on January 14, 2022.

== Education ==
He is an alumnus of Northwestern University in Chicago.

== See also ==
- The Guardian
- Heartland
- Ray Donovan
