= Ray Donovan: The Movie =

2022 American crime drama television film

- Film poster
- Created by: Ann Biderman
- Written by: David Hollander; Liev Schreiber
- Directed by: David Hollander
- Starring: Liev Schreiber; Eddie Marsan; Dash Mihok; Pooch Hall; Kerris Dorsey; Jon Voight
- Music by: Marcelo Zarvos
- Country of origin: United States
- Original language: English

Production
- Executive producers: David Hollander; Liev Schreiber; Mark Gordon; Bryan Zuriff; Lou Fusaro
- Cinematography: David Franco
- Editor: Lynne Willingham
- Running time: 100 minutes
- Production company: The Mark Gordon Company

Original release
- Network: Showtime
- Release: January 14, 2022

Ray Donovan: The Movie is an American crime drama television film directed by David Hollander, who co-wrote it with Liev Schreiber. It is the follow-up to the seventh and final season of the television series of the same name, which aired its final episode in 2020. It centers on the title character, portrayed by Schreiber, and the relationships with his family, including brothers Terry, Bunchy and Daryll, played by Eddie Marsan, Dash Mihok and Pooch Hall, respectively.

Ray Donovan: The Movie debuted on January 14, 2022, on Showtime. The film was nominated for Outstanding Television Movie at the 74th Primetime Creative Arts Emmy Awards.

== Cast ==
- Liev Schreiber as Ray Donovan
- Eddie Marsan as Terry Donovan
- Dash Mihok as Bunchy Donovan
- Pooch Hall as Daryll Donovan
- Kerris Dorsey as Bridget Donovan
- Katherine Moennig as Lena Burnham
- Kerry Condon as Molly Lollyman
- Jon Voight as Mickey Donovan
- Bill Heck as Young Mickey
- Josh Hamilton as Kevin Sullivan
- Graham Rogers as Jacob "Smitty" Smith
- Alyssa Diaz as Teresa Donovan
- David Patrick Kelly as Matty Galloway
- Austin Hébert as Young Jim Sullivan
- Chris Gray as Young Ray Donovan
- AJ Michalka as Young Abby
- Chris Petrovski as Young Sean Walker
- Alan Alda as Dr. Arthur Amiot

== Plot ==
Following from the events of the season 7 finale, Mickey (Jon Voight) is on the run, and Ray (Liev Schreiber) is determined to find and stop him before he can cause any more damage to his family and friends.

== Production ==
In 2020, Showtime abruptly announced that season 7 of Ray Donovan would be the end of the series. Fans of the show petitioned for a follow-up to be written after the final season left many questions unanswered. On February 12, 2020, Liev Schreiber wrote on his Instagram, "It seems your voices have been heard. Too soon to say how or when, but with a little luck and your continued support, there will be more Ray Donovan." Following the announcement of a television film follow-up, in 2021, Showtime's President of Entertainment Gary Levine stated that the audience would be satisfied with the ending of the film, admitting "we did hear from fans, and we are nothing if not responsive to our audience. I think this Ray Donovan two-hour movie will go a long way to making that landing more graceful."

Principal photography began in May 2021 and was wrapped in a few months, with the film shot in New York, Connecticut and Massachusetts.

== Reception ==
Kerris Dorsey received an honorable mention for TVLine's Performer of the Week ending on January 15, 2022.

=== Critical response ===
On the review aggregator website Rotten Tomatoes, 81% of 16 critics' reviews are positive, with an average rating of 6.4/10. The website's consensus reads: "If Ray Donovan: The Movie doesn't accomplish everything that a proper final season could have achieved, it nevertheless satisfies with a prologue and epilogue to the fixer's family woes."

=== Accolades ===
Year	Award	Category	Nominee(s)	Result	Ref.
2022	Hollywood Critics Association Awards	Best Broadcast Network or Cable Live-Action Television Movie	Ray Donovan: The Movie	Nominated	
2022	Creative Arts Emmy Awards	Outstanding Television Movie	David Hollander, Liev Schreiber, Mark Gordon, Bryan Zuriff, Lou Fusaro, Jason Weinberg, and John H. Radulovic	Nominated	
2023	Critics' Choice Awards	Best Movie Made for Television	Ray Donovan: The Movie	Nominated	
