= Demographics of Brooklyn =

Population trend

Year	Inhabitants
1731	2,150
1756	2,707
1771	3,623
1786	3,966
1790	4,549
1800	5,740
1810	8,303
1820	11,187
1830	20,535
1840	47,613
1850	138,882
1860	279,122
1870	419,921
1880	599,495

Year	Inhabitants
1890	838,547
1900	1,166,582
1910	1,634,351
1920	2,018,356
1930	2,560,401
1940	2,698,285
1950	2,738,175
1960	2,627,319
1970	2,602,012
1980	2,230,936
1990	2,300,664
2000	2,465,326
2010	2,504,710
2020	2,736,074

The demographics of Brooklyn reveal a very diverse borough of New York City and a melting pot for many cultures, like the city itself. Since 2010, the population of Brooklyn was estimated by the Census Bureau to have increased 3.5% to 2,592,149 as of 2013, representing 30.8% of New York City's population, 33.5% of Long Island's population, and 13.2% of New York State's population. If the boroughs of New York City were separate cities, Brooklyn would be the third-largest city in the United States after Los Angeles and Chicago.

According to the 2010 Census, 35.7% of the population was non-Hispanic White, 31.9% non-Hispanic Black or African American, 10.4% non-Hispanic Asian, 0.4% from some other race (non-Hispanic) and 1.6% of two or more races (non-Hispanic). 19.8% of Brooklyn's population was of Hispanic, Latino, or Spanish origin (they may be of any race).

In the 2020 census data from New York City Department of City Planning, there were a total of 2,736,074 residents with 968,427 White residents making up 35.4%, 729,696 Black residents making up 26.7%, 516,426 Hispanic residents making up 18.9%, and 370,776 Asian residents making up 13.6%.

== Households ==
Of its 880,727 households 33.3% have children under the age of 18 living in them, 38.6% were married couples living together, 22.3% had a female householder with no husband present, and 33.7% were non-families. Of all households 27.8% are made up of individuals, and 9.8% had someone living alone who was 65 years of age or older. The average household size was 2.75 and the average family size was 3.41.

In the county the population was spread out, with 26.9% under the age of 18, 10.3% from 18 to 24, 30.8% from 25 to 44, 20.6% from 45 to 64, and 11.5% who are 65 years of age or older. The median age is 33 years. For every 100 females there were 88.4 males. For every 100 females age 18 and over, there were 83.1 males.

== Income ==
The median income for a household in the county was $83,770 as of 2024. About 19.2% of the population were below the poverty line.

== Race and ethnicity ==
Brooklyn / Kings County, New York – Racial and ethnic composition Note: the US Census treats Hispanic/Latino as an ethnic category. This table excludes Latinos from the racial categories and assigns them to a separate category. Hispanics/Latinos may be of any race.
Race / ethnicity (NH = Non-Hispanic)	Pop 1980	Pop 1990	Pop 2000	Pop 2010	Pop 2020	% 1980	% 1990	% 2000	% 2010	% 2020
White alone (NH)	1,085,233	923,229	854,532	893,306	968,427	48.64%	40.13%	34.66%	35.67%	35.39%
Black or African American alone (NH)	689,626	797,802	848,583	799,066	729,696	30.91%	34.68%	34.42%	31.90%	26.67%
Native American or Alaska Native alone (NH)	3,182	5,416	4,494	4,638	3,964	0.14%	0.24%	0.18%	0.19%	0.14%
Asian alone (NH)	42,965	106,022	184,291	260,129	370,776	1.93%	4.61%	7.48%	10.39%	13.55%
Native Hawaiian or Pacific Islander alone (NH)	x	x	803	633	718	x	x	0.03%	0.03%	0.03%
Other race alone (NH)	17,812	5,784	16,057	10,633	32,897	0.80%	0.25%	0.65%	0.42%	1.20%
Mixed race or Multiracial (NH)	x	x	68,688	40,010	113,170	x	x	2.79%	1.60%	4.14%
Hispanic or Latino (any race)	392,118	462,411	487,878	496,285	516,426	17.58%	20.10%	19.79%	19.81%	18.87%
Total	2,230,936	2,300,664	2,465,326	2,504,700	2,736,074	100.00%	100.00%	100.00%	100.00%	100.00%

According to the 2009 American Community Survey, White Americans made up 54.6% of Brooklyn's population. Black Americans made up 34.2% of Brooklyn's population; non-Hispanic black people made up 32.9% of the population. Native Americans made up 0.3% of Brooklyn's population. Asian Americans made up 9.5% of the population; Pacific Islander Americans made up 0.1% of the populace. Multiracial Americans made up 1.4% of Brooklyn's population. Hispanic and Latino Americans made up 19.6% of Brooklyn's population.

=== European Americans ===
As of the 2020s, the European White American communities are mainly concentrated in southern parts of Brooklyn and northwestern sections of Brooklyn. The Italian Americans are mainly concentrated in Dyker Heights, Bensonhurst, Bath Beach, Mill Basin and Gravesend and in scattered parts of northwest Brooklyn such as Williamsburg, Carroll Gardens, and Cobble Hill; however, Bensonhurst has long held the name as the Little Italy of Brooklyn despite its ongoing slow decline since the 2000s as more of them are migrating to the suburbs with the Asian population increasing in Bensonhurst. Jewish Americans are mainly concentrated in Borough Park, Sheepshead Bay, Midwood, Kensington, Gravesend, Brighton Beach, and Coney Island. There is a significant Polish Community in Greenpoint often with the nickname, "Little Poland" though due to gentrification it is experiencing significant decline. The Russian-speaking communities are mainly concentrated in Brighton Beach and Sheepshead Bay though with some of them overlapping into Bensonhurst as well.

Lapskaus Boulevard in Bay Ridge and Sunset Park has long been a Norwegian enclave and the neighborhoods have also been home to many Swedish and Danish immigrants while the northern part of Sunset Park is also home to a sizable Finnish immigrant enclave called Finntown, surrounding the park of the same name, bounded by 5th Avenue to the west and 8th Avenue to the east, 39th Street to the north and 45th Street to the south. The Finns brought with them the concept of cooperative housing, and the Alku and Alku Toinen apartment house at 816 43rd Street is said to be the first cooperative apartment building in New York City. However, by the mid 20th century, these neighborhoods were increasingly being shared with Latino and Asian residents, though significant numbers of the Nordic Americans still remain, but in lower numbers than their peak periods in the early to mid 20th century.

Historically during the early-to-mid-20th century, areas surrounding Bedford Stuyvesant such as Crown Heights, Ocean Hill, Brownsville, East New York, Bushwick, Flatbush, East Flatbush, and Canarsie were once mainly populated by European Americans with many being Italian and Jewish enclaves though with some Irish and German enclaves. Even Bedford Stuyvesant also had a significant Jewish and Italian presence until the 1940s. However, within the mid-to-late 20th century, they all slowly began to shift into majority African-American/West Indian American neighborhoods with some limited Latino enclaves in Bushwick, Cypress Hills, and a portion of East New York. During the 1950s–'90s, these neighborhoods experienced en masse White flight.

A section of Crown Heights and a section of Flatbush still have significant remaining small Jewish enclaves. A subsection neighborhood of East New York called Starrett City or Spring Creek still have significant scattered numbers of European Americans. However, in recent decades since the 2000s and especially since the 2010s, the White population has started to rapidly regrow in Bedford Stuyvesant, Crown Heights, Bushwick, Ocean Hill, and Flatbush, which these areas are undergoing gentrification. Since the early 2020s, even Brownsville is also experiencing a resurgence of a growing Jewish community as a result of young orthodox Jewish families coming from Crown Heights to seek affordable homes to purchase as property values and sales prices of homes in Crown Heights have largely spiked and gentrified immensely.

According to the 2009 American Community Survey, the six most common European ancestries were the following.

As according to the 2020 census data, the White European American population in Brooklyn increased from 893,306 residents at 35.7% in 2010 to 968,427 residents at 35.4% in 2020 a gain of 75,121 residents or 8.4%, though the percentage portion of White residents out of the total population of Brooklyn slightly declined due to other racial populations increasing adding to the population.

Ancestry	Number	% of total population
Italian	157,068	6.1
Irish	100,923	3.9
Russian	88,766	3.5
Polish	71,099	2.8
German	53,188	2.1
English	36,174	1.4

=== African Americans ===
According to the 2009 American Community Survey, African Americans made up over one-third (34.2%) of Brooklyn's population. There are over 877,000 African Americans residing in Brooklyn. The historical cultural center of the borough has long been Bedford–Stuyvesant; African Americans became a majority in Bedford–Stuyvesant in the 1930s following the construction of the A line subway between Harlem and Bedford. Bedford-Stuyvesant was the first large African-American community to be established in Brooklyn back then.

After Bedford–Stuyvesant had largely developed into an African-American community in the 1930s–'40s, neighborhoods surrounding Bedford–Stuyvesant in Northern and Eastern Brooklyn such as Ocean Hill, Brownsville, Crown Heights, Flatbush, Kensington, Canarsie, East Flatbush, Prospect Lefferts Gardens, East New York and Fort Greene had continued to be mostly home to Italian and Jewish enclaves with some Germans and Irish intermixed in even though some of the growing African-American population also did spillover into some of these neighborhoods. However, through the processes of a Ripple effect, a Domino effect, and a Snowball effect, starting in the 1950s and throughout the remainder of the 20th century, these surrounding neighborhoods became the next areas to slowly transition to majority African-American communities. Large West Indian Black communities have also emerged and intertwined in some of these areas. As a result, a very large portion of the northern half of Brooklyn is dominantly populated by African Americans with significant West Indian Black enclaves, though Crown Heights and Flatbush continue to have remaining small significant Jewish communities. The roads of Eastern Parkway, Malcolm X Boulevard, Kings Highway, Broadway, Atlantic Avenue, Linden Boulevard, Flatlands Avenue and Jackie Robinson Parkway connect all of these neighborhoods to the point of being very comparatively similar to the city of Newark in terms of the geographic size and the dominantly Black communities.

Coney Island, located in the southernmost portion of Brooklyn, also has a significant African-American population. Together these neighborhoods have a population of about 940,000 and are roughly 82% African American, making it the largest African-American community in the United States. However, the 2020 census data showed that the Black population in NYC has declined from 1,861,295 residents at 22.8% in 2010 to 1,776,891 residents at 20.2% in 2020 with a loss of -84,404 resident or -4.5%. Brooklyn itself had the sharpest declines of the Black population of all of the NYC boroughs going from 799,066 residents at 31.9% in 2010 to 729,696 residents at 26.7% in 2020 with a loss of -69,370 residents at -8.7%. In all of Brooklyn, the Black population was the only population to experience significant declines while all other populations of racial groups experienced increases. Many of the Black neighborhoods in northern Brooklyn such as Bedford Stuyvesant, Crown Heights, Ocean Hill, and Flatbush are now undergoing gentrification and rapidly regaining White residents, which are wealthier professionals instead of the working class European immigrants and European Americans that were previously majority populations in these neighborhoods.

Fort Greene, which has been a majority Black neighborhood since the 1970s though with some significant mixtures of Hispanic and White residents and very limited Asian residents has re-transitioned back to a White population majority since the 2010s though significant amount of Black residents still remain with now a slow increasing population of Asian and Hispanic residents; the last time Fort Greene had a White majority population was in the 1960s–'70s.

=== Caribbean Americans ===
According to the 2010 US Census data on brooklyn.com there are approximately 370,000 (16.4%) persons of Caribbean descent in Brooklyn. That figure includes persons who identify with the Dominican Republic (3.3%) but does not include the Puerto Rican population (7.4%). Including Puerto Ricans there are approximately 560,000 (23.8%) persons of Caribbean descent in Brooklyn. Similar, but not identical demographics in America can be found in Miami, but there are not as many Cubans in New York. A large population of Brooklyn's Caribbean decedents are of Trinidadian, Jamaican, Barbadian, Haitian, Saint Lucians and Guyanese immigrants. As of 2017, between the neighborhoods of Flatbush, East Flatbush, and Crown Heights, has been nicknamed Little Caribbean due to the large concentrations of Caribbean populations. The adjacent neighborhood Canarsie is also another large Caribbean neighborhood, which emerged towards the late 1990s, whereas the Caribbean communities of East Flatbush, Flatbush, and Crown Heights developed earlier, around the 1960s–'70s.

=== Hispanics and Latinos ===
According to the 2009 American Community Survey, Hispanics and Latinos made up nearly one-fifth (19.6%) of Brooklyn's population. Over 500,000 Hispanics and Latinos reside in Brooklyn. Nearly 190,000 Puerto Ricans call the borough home, and they make up 7.4% of the population. The borough's 91,000 Mexican Americans make up 3.6% of its population. Many neighborhoods in the very Northern parts of Brooklyn are home to a high number of Hispanics mainly from Puerto Rico, the Dominican Republic, and Central America. Hispanics are mainly concentrated in neighborhoods in the North Central and Northeast sections of Brooklyn, though there are some spillovers of the Hispanic population into Northwestern Brooklyn such as Williamsburg.

Hispanics have become the majority in former African-American neighborhoods such as Bushwick, East Williamsburg and Cypress Hills. Sunset Park, in South Brooklyn is also home to a large Hispanic community. Since the 2000s, especially since the 2010s, other southern Brooklyn neighborhoods such as Dyker Heights, Gravesend, and especially in Bensonhurst and Bay Ridge have started to receive significant growing Hispanic populations as well though are more mixed in with the populations of predominantly White Americans and Asian Americans.

The 2020 census data showed that Brooklyn's Hispanic population increased from 496,285 residents at 19.8% in 2010 to 516,426 residents at 18.9% a gain of 20,141 residents or 4.1%, though as other racial populations increased in the borough, the Hispanic population percentage portion decreased slightly.

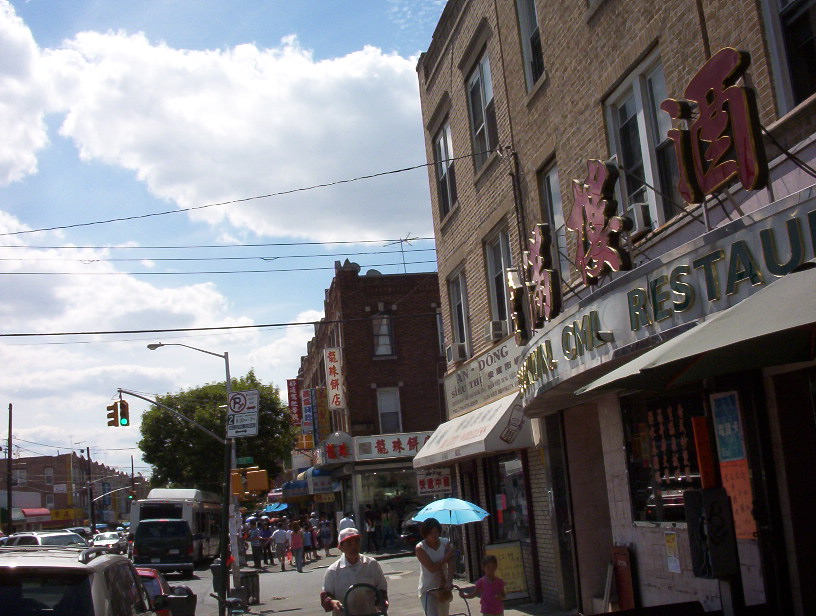
Brooklyn Chinatown

=== Asian Americans ===
Over 243,000 Asians live in the borough. The most numerous Asian-American group are those of Chinese descent. Chinese Americans make up 6.4% of the borough's population, numbering over 163,000 individuals. Much of Brooklyn's Asian population is concentrated in Southern Brooklyn neighborhoods such as Sunset Park ("Brooklyn's Chinatown"), Homecrest, Sheepshead Bay ("Avenue U Chinatown") and Bensonhurst ("Bensonhurst Chinatown"). The Chinese were second only to Queens among New York boroughs, meaning Manhattan's Chinatown is no longer the main residence of Chinese in the city. Initially, Sunset Park was the primary destination for the newly arriving Chinese immigrants, many fleeing from the original Manhattan's Chinatown during the 1980s–'90s and most of them were Cantonese-speaking immigrants creating the original Brooklyn's Chinatown; however, since the 2000s, a large influx of Fuzhou-speaking immigrants have become the largest Chinese group population in Sunset Park expanding the Sunset Park Chinatown dramatically and now being given the name, Brooklyn's Little Fuzhou and since then, Cantonese-speaking immigrants in Brooklyn including new arrivals have been dramatically shifting to and concentrating in Bensonhurst and Sheepshead Bay/Homecrest creating newer Chinatowns of Brooklyn or Brooklyn's Little Hong Kong/Guangdong.

Approximately 19,851 Asian Indians, 9,681 Filipino Americans, and 6,977 Korean Americans reside in Brooklyn. Brooklyn has the most Vietnamese Americans of any borough, numbering over 5,700 individuals. The 4,704 Japanese Americans rounded out Asian-American groups with over 1,000 people in Brooklyn.

There is a sizable Pakistani American community in the Midwood section of Brooklyn and there is a "Little Pakistan" on Coney Island Avenue in Brooklyn. Pakistanis are concentrated heavily in the Midwood section of Brooklyn, and are one of the fastest growing Asian ethnic groups in Brooklyn. Pakistanis number around 30,000 and counting in Brooklyn and their community is growing rapidly. Many halal restaurants, fabric stores, Pakistani clothing stores and mosques are centered on Coney Island Avenue.

Currently, the Brooklyn Asian enclaves are scattered and intertwined with the predominant European American communities in southern Brooklyn. Many Bangladeshis are now living here.

2020 U.S. Census data showed that the Asian population grew the fastest of all racial groups in Brooklyn, increasing from 260,129 residents (10.4%) in 2010 to 370,776 residents (13.6%) in 2020.

=== Arab Americans ===
Arab Americans currently reside in the western and southern central parts of Brooklyn, with a small population in eastern Brooklyn. Bay Ridge currently holds the highest percentage of Arab Americans. Other neighborhoods include Boerum Hill, which historically held the largest Yemeni population, but now many Yemeni Americans have moved to Bay Ridge due to the increase of rent in Boerum Hill. Bensonhurst, Bath Beach, parts of Sunset Park, Dyker Heights Park Slope, and East New York also hold a large amount of Arab Americans.

=== Jewish Americans ===
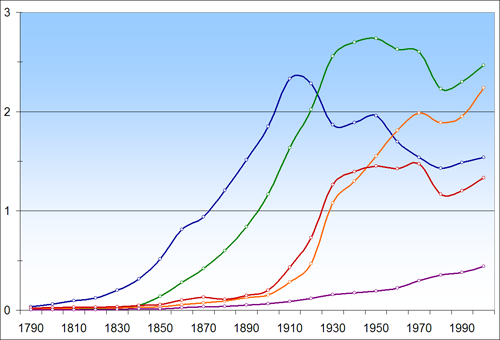
Brooklyn has been the city's largest borough since the mid-1920s. (Key: Each borough's historical population in millions. The Bronx, Brooklyn, Manhattan, Queens, Staten Island).

According to the American Jewish Population Project, Brooklyn has the largest Jewish population in New York City with over 480,000 Jews. The borough population is 22.4% Jewish, with Jews being the predominant ethnic group in neighborhoods such as Borough Park, Williamsburg, Midwood, Ocean Parkway, a portion of Crown Heights, and a portion of Flatbush.

== Language ==
Brooklyn has a high degree of linguistic diversity. As of 2010, 54.12% (1,240,416) of Brooklyn residents age 5 and older spoke English at home as a primary language, while 17.16% (393,340) spoke Spanish, 6.46% (148,012) Chinese, 5.31% (121,607) Russian, 3.47% (79,469) Yiddish, 2.75% (63,019) French Creole, 1.35% (31,004) Italian, 1.20% (27,440) Hebrew, 1.01% (23,207) Polish, 0.99% (22,763) French, 0.95% (21,773) Arabic, 0.85% (19,388) various Indic languages, 0.99% (22,763) Turkish, 0.70% (15,936) Urdu, and African languages were spoken as a main language by 0.54% (12,305) of the population over the age of five. In total, 45.88% (1,051,456) of Brooklyn's population age 5 and older spoke a mother language other than English.

== Sources ==
- "Historic Structures Report: Sunset Park Historic District" (PDF). National Register of Historic Places, National Park Service. August 3, 1988.
