= Little Bangladesh, Brooklyn =

Commercial and cultural enclave in New York City

Coordinates: 40°38′34″N 73°58′46″W

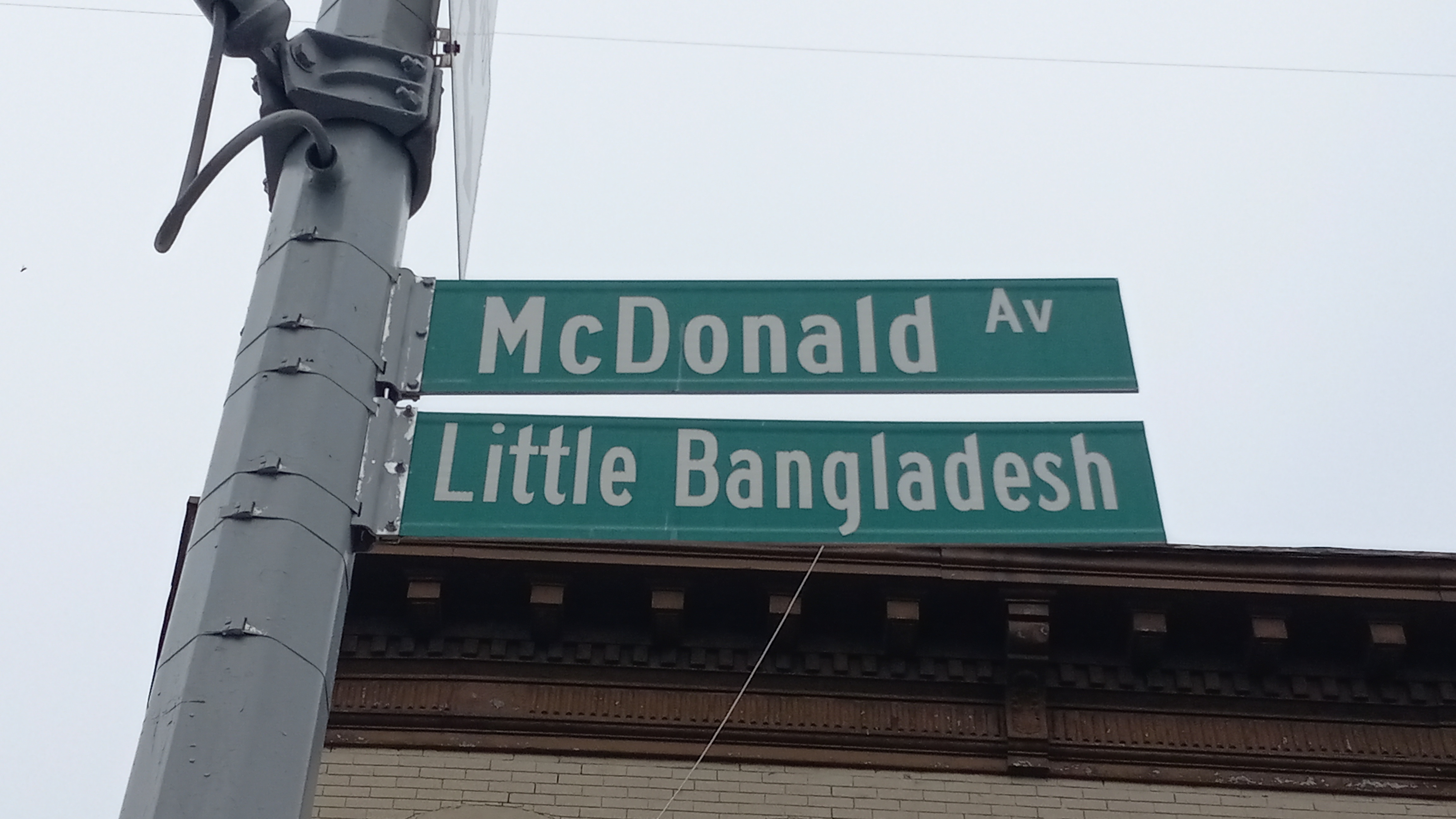
Little Bangladesh street sign on McDonald Avenue in 2024

Little Bangladesh is a commercial and cultural enclave in the New York City borough of Brooklyn. A part of the Kensington neighborhood, the corridor of Church and McDonald Avenue serves as the heart of the Bangladeshi-American community. The section was formally recognized as "Little Bangladesh" in October 2022. This area is home to about 35% of Bangladeshis in New York City. Almost entirely a working class community, most immigrants are from the regions of Chittagong, Sandwip and Noakhali in Bangladesh who began moving into the neighborhood in the early 1980s.

== History ==
=== Early settlement ===
Asian Oriental Grocery opened in Kensington in the 1980s. Rather than traveling all the way to Queens, the store offers essential everyday products, including Bengali spices, vegetables, and halal meat, for Bangladeshis living in Brooklyn. Early Bangladeshi immigrants came to America through the Diversity Visa Program, ship jumping and Family Reunification. After Bangladesh's Independence in 1971, the Bangladesh community in America rocketed due to legal migration through the Diversity Program Lottery that started in the 70s.

=== Recognition ===
On October 16, 2022, Shahana Hanif, the first Muslim woman in the New York City Council and the daughter of Bangladeshi immigrants living in the area, made the effort to co-name the intersection of McDonald Avenue and Church Avenue as Little Bangladesh. Shahana Hanif, City Comptroller Brad Lander, and Assemblyman Robert Carroll were joined by Bangladeshi leaders to unveil the sign. The co-naming effort occurred a few months after an intersection in Queens also received a co-naming of the same name.

== Businesses ==
=== Restaurants ===
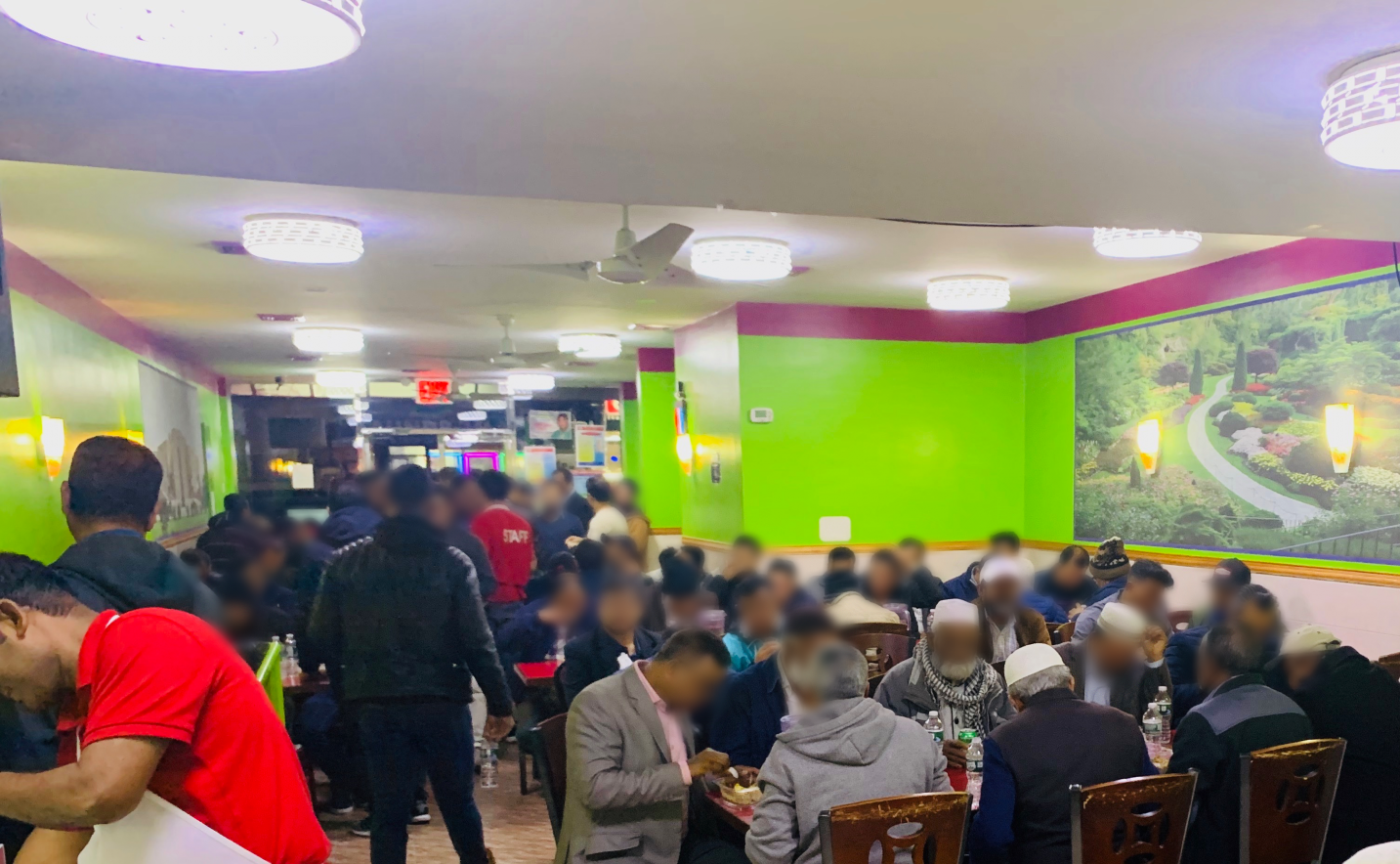
Bangladeshi men eating dinner together inside Radhuni Sweets & Restaurant.

The Kensington Bangladeshi community can be seen in the restaurants and grocery stores along Church Avenue. Men are often seen there drinking tea and eating familiar Bangladeshi snacks. These restaurants become a mix of a community center and a living room.

==== Radhuni Sweets & Restaurant ====
Founded by councilmember Shahana Hanif's father and other community members, the restaurant is busy all day and night. It is now under female ownership.

==== Sonia's Cafe ====
This is a woman-owned restaurant that opened during the pandemic, and their specialty is snacks and street food (like piyaju and samosas), but specifically fuchka (fritters filled with chickpeas and potato, topped with tamarind water).

==== Abdullah Sweets ====
A lot of native Bengali sweets, like chomchom and roshogolla, can be found at Abdullah Sweets.

== Economy ==
The Little Bangladesh neighborhood is a primarily working-class with members working in different fields:

=== Construction ===
A number of men work in day labor, metalwork, and subcontracting jobs. Many of these men find work through informal networks at gathering places, such as the corner of McDonald and Church.

=== Food delivery ===
During and after the COVID-19 pandemic, many young Bangladeshi men worked with food delivery apps like Seamless and DoorDash, but frequently face considerable risks including accidents and crime.

=== Taxi drivers ===
40% of New York City taxi drivers come from South Asia, of which many are Bangladeshi.

=== Economic struggles ===
About 28.2% of Bangladeshis in New York City live below the poverty line, as opposed to 20.6% of the general population of New York City. Among that, child poverty was 35.1%. Kensington has seen increases in rent and housing leading to displacement, with families being more interested in affordable housing in Queens and Buffalo, New York.
