= Brooklyn Community Board 12 =

Brooklyn Community District 12
- Community District
- Country: United States
- State: New York
- City: New York City
- Borough: Brooklyn
- Neighborhoods: List: Borough Park; Kensington; Ocean Parkway; Midwood

Government
  - Chairperson: Yidel Perlstein
  - District Manager: Barry Spitzer

Area
  - Total: 3.6 sq mi (9.3 km^{2})

Population (2010)
  - Total: 191,382
  - Density: 53,000/sq mi (21,000/km^{2})

Ethnicity
  - White: 70.6%
  - Asian: 14.3%
  - Hispanic and Latino Americans: 10.8%
  - African-American: 2.3%
  - Others: 2.0%
- Time zone: UTC−5 (Eastern)
  - Summer (DST): UTC−4 (EDT)
- ZIP codes: 11210, 11218, 11219, and 11230 & 11204
- Area code: 718, 347, 929, and 917
- Police Precincts: 66th (website)
- Website: www.brooklyncb12.org//

Brooklyn Community Board 12 is New York City community board that encompasses the Brooklyn neighborhoods of Borough Park, Kensington, Ocean Parkway, and Midwood.

== Geography ==
Brooklyn Community Board 12 is delimited by 61st Street on the west, 8th Avenue, 37th Street and Caton Avenue on the north, Coney Island Avenue, 18th Street, MacDonald Avenue and Long Island Rail Road on the east, as well as by Avenue P on the south. The land area is 2,304.1 acres (9.324 km^{2}).

== Population ==
As of the United States Census 2000, the Community Board has a population of 185,046, up from 160,018 in 1990 and 155,903 in 1980. Of them (as of 2000), 120,697 (65.2%) are White non Hispanic, 5,398 (2.9%) are African-American, 26,030 (14.1%) Asian or Pacific Islander, 206 (0.1%) American Indian or Native Alaskan, 2,089 (1.1%) of some other race, 6,224(3.4%) of two or more race, 24,402 (13.2%) of Hispanic origins. 44.1% of the population benefit from public assistance as of 2004, up from 25.6% in 2000.

== Leadership ==
The Board's current chairman is Yidel Perlstein, and its district manager is Barry Spitzer.

=== Controversies ===
Perlstein, the first Hasidic Jew to fill the position, was elected in March 2012, unseating 19-year veteran Alex Dubrow. Perlstein's win was controversial due to his having served only nine months out of the twelve required in order to qualify for a candidacy. Perlstein was vigorously supported by New York City Councilmember David G. Greenfield, his intervention being called "an unprecedented act of intimidation by an elected official" by board members.

During a taped phone conversation, Perlstein described how at a September 2015 breakfast meeting in Williamsburg, Brooklyn he convinced a New York City Police Department assistant chief to appeal to future Police Commissioner James P. O'Neill to keep a friendly promoted lieutenant at the 66th Precinct, a police station in Community Board 12. This went contrary to standard procedure of transferring promoted officers to other precincts in order to prevent animosity from peers, and corruption. The officer was later found to be connected to Alex Lichtenstein, a Shomrim leader who was convicted in 2017 of bribing police officers almost $1 million in order to receive 150 gun permits for resale to community members. The lieutenant was subsequently stripped of his badge and gun, and transferred.
