= Linda Weiser Friedman =

American author and academic

- Occupations: Professor, Baruch College and the Graduate Center (CUNY)

Academic background
- Education: Baruch College (BA); New York University Polytechnic School of Engineering (Ph.D.)

Academic work
- Discipline: Statistics, Computer information systems, Humor

Linda Weiser Friedman (born 1953) is an author and academic. She is a Professor of Statistics and Computer Information Systems at Baruch College and the CUNY Graduate Center. Friedman holds a PhD in Operations Research from New York University Polytechnic School of Engineering and a B.A degree in Statistics / Biology from Baruch College. Her research and teaching interests are varied and include business statistics, object-oriented programming, humor studies, Jewish studies, online education, social media, and all things technology. Her most recent book is God Laughed: Sources of Jewish Humor (ISBN 9781412853767), which Publishers Weekly called a "lighthearted but thoughtful study". She also writes fiction and poetry, and lives in the Borough Park neighborhood of Brooklyn.

== Early life ==
Linda Weiser Friedman was born in New York City to Norman and Marion Weiser, and grew up in the Brooklyn neighborhoods of Crown Heights and Midwood. She attended Crown Heights Yeshiva (when it was still located at 310 Crown St.) and Esther Schoenfeld High School on the Lower East Side. She married Hershey H. Friedman in 1972; they have five adult children.

== Books ==
- Hershey H. Friedman and Linda Weiser Friedman, God Laughed: Sources of Jewish Humor, Transaction Publishers, 2014.ISBN 9781412853767
- Linda Weiser Friedman, The Simulation Metamodel, Kluwer Academic, Norwell, Massachusetts, 1996. ISBN 0792396480
- Linda Weiser Friedman, Comparative Programming Languages: Generalizing the Programming Function. Englewood Cliffs, NJ: Prentice Hall, 1991. ISBN 0131554824
- Deadly Stakes, coauthored with Hershey H. Friedman under the pseudonym H. Fred Wiser, Walker Publishing, 1989. ISBN 0802757324
