= Yechezkel Roth =

American rabbi (1936–2021)

Rabbi Yechezkel Roth
- יחזקאל ראָט
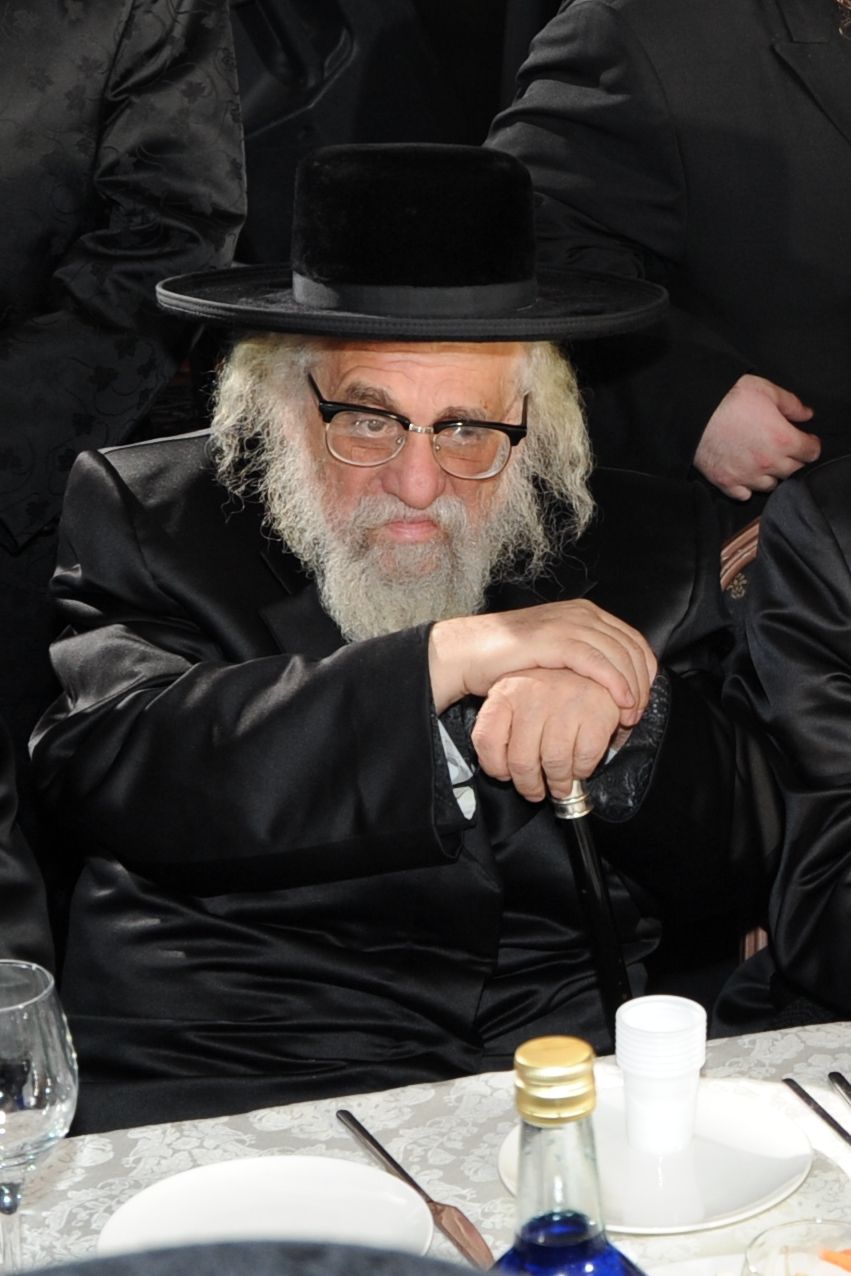
- פוסק
- Title: Karlsburger Rav

Personal life
- Born: 1936 Sălciua, Transylvania, Kingdom of Romania
- Died: March 7, 2021 Borough Park, Brooklyn, New York City, United States
- Buried: Karlsburg Cemetery, Meron, Israel
- Spouse: Chaya Rechel (Rochel) Roth

Religious life
- Religion: Judaism
- Denomination: Hasidic

Rabbi Yechezkel Roth (Yiddish: יחזקאל ראָט; 17 November 1914 – 7 March 2021), also known as the Karlsburger Rav, was a Romanian-born American rabbi. He was the author of Emek HaTeshuvah (nine volumes: Chezkas Taharah Hilchos Niddah, Emek Shmaatsa Gemara, Chazon Yechezkel on Drush, Mishpat Ha’aretz on Shmittah, Keren HaTorah Ribbis, Mai Chanukah on Hilchos Chanukah) and other works.

In March 2016 he was hospitalized after a coronary. He was mekadeish his wife a second time after he recovered. His wife Rochel Roth died at age 77 on December 4, 2017, after suffering a heart attack.. On March 7, 2021, Rabbi Roth suffered a massive heart attack at around 8:00AM. Hatzolah rushed to the scene and did all they could to save his life but he died at around 8:30AM.

== Biography ==
Roth was the leader of a venerated Bais Horaah in Borough Park, Brooklyn, and was one of leading Poskim in the world.

After many years of living in Israel, he emigrated to the US, where he eventually became recognized as one of the great diaspora poskim. Years later, he began dividing his time between New York and Israel, where he would seclude himself for weeks on end in Meron in the spiritual shadow at the most famous for the tomb of Rabbi Shimon bar Yochai.

In 1972, the Satmar Rebbe, Rabbi Joel Teitelbaum sought a Posek with uncompromising spiritual standards to serve on the Satmar beis din in Boro Park. The Rebbe's spiritual requirements were daunting. Roth whose brilliance in Torah is surpassed only by his staunch principles that closely match those of Satmar, was immediately approved by Teitelbaum. He dispatched messengers to Roth's home in Israel requesting that Rav Roth relocate to Boro Park to disseminate Torah, and Roth assented. Since then, he lived in New York, and although he is not officially affiliated with any group, he has close ties with the Satmar community.

Roth soon acquired a reputation as one of the most prominent Poskim of the generation. He accepted the most complex sh’eilos from all sections of the Shulkhan Arukh, responding in lucid, understandable terms. His piskei halachah are studied and analyzed in batei medrash l’hora’ah throughout the world, and some of his responses to personal status and family issues have ended months and even years of halachic debate where other dayanim were unwilling to take responsibility for such sensitive rulings.
