= Killing of Gidone Busch =

1999 police shooting in New York City

- Date: August 30, 1999
- Time: 6:48 p.m. (EDT)
- Location: 1619 46th Street, Brooklyn, New York City; 40.63269°N 73.98306°W
- Type: Use of force
- Deaths: 1 (Gidone Busch)
- Verdict: New York City Police Department (NYPD) found not liable
- Litigation: Lawsuit by Busch's family against the NYPD

Gidone Busch or Gary Busch (1968 – August 30, 1999) was a mentally ill Breslover Hasid who was shot and killed outside his apartment in Borough Park, Brooklyn by four officers of the New York City Police Department, who fired on him at least 12 times. The killing was controversial, because although Busch was armed at the time, the weapon he brandished was a claw hammer, and accounts of the incident varied.

== Background ==
=== Early life ===
Gidone Busch was born to Norman Busch, a dentist, and his wife Doris, a divorce mediator. He had a brother named Glenn. At one point, Norman and Doris divorced, whereupon Doris married Howard Boskey, a psychiatrist. Busch grew up in a comfortable suburban home in Dix Hills, New York.

=== College years and mental illness ===
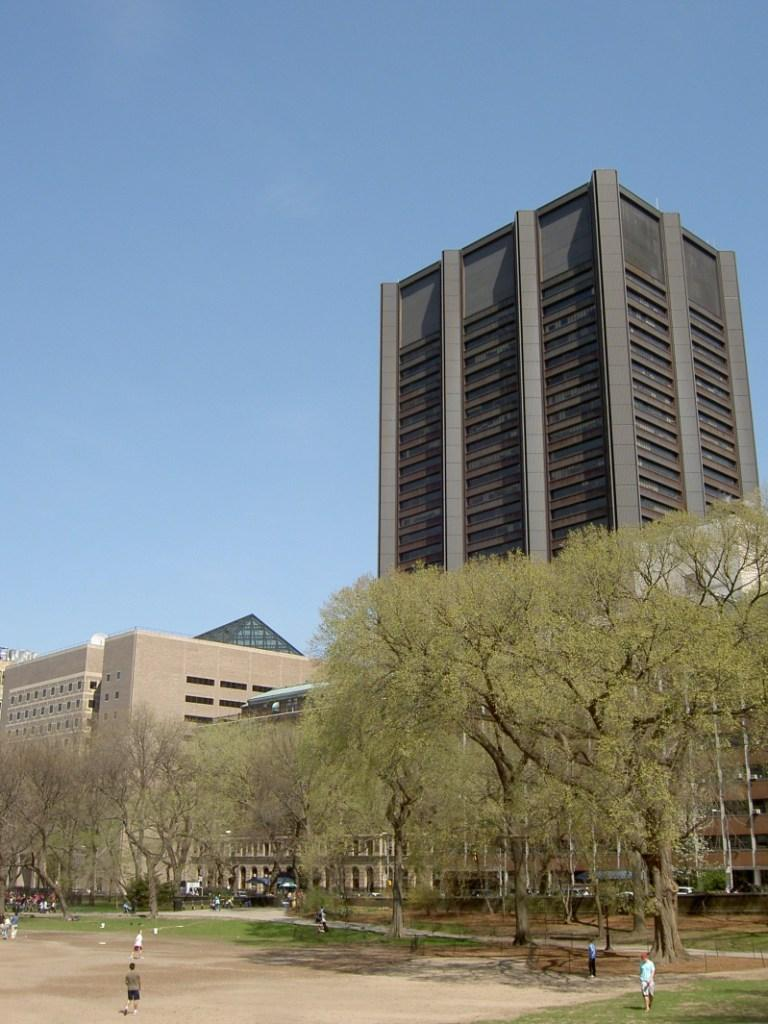
Icahn School of Medicine at Mount Sinai

In 1991, while Busch was a third-year medical student at Mount Sinai Medical School in New York City, a routine urine test revealed that he had IgA nephropathy, an immune system disease that could lead to kidney failure. The revelation shook Busch deeply, causing him to drop out of medical school. He read books on philosophy and immersed himself in music in a quest for meaning in life. Busch decided to explore a path to spiritual enlightenment in his own religion of Judaism, and he promptly moved to Israel. During his seven years there, he vacillated between various Jewish sects, starting with a conventional Orthodox yeshiva in Jerusalem, continuing on to Chabad, and then to a Na Nach yeshiva in Safed. Eventually, Busch went back to the more mainstream Breslov Hasidic group.

The diagnosis also triggered immobilizing depressions in Busch, which later developed into serious mental illness. Busch's mental health history included three involuntary commitments at a hospital on Long Island, where he had made threats to his parents, and evinced signs of paranoid schizophrenia. He once became very agitated, and kicked a hole in the wall of his room at his mother's house, saying afterward, "I can't believe I did that. I love this house. I grew up in this house."

=== Borough Park ===
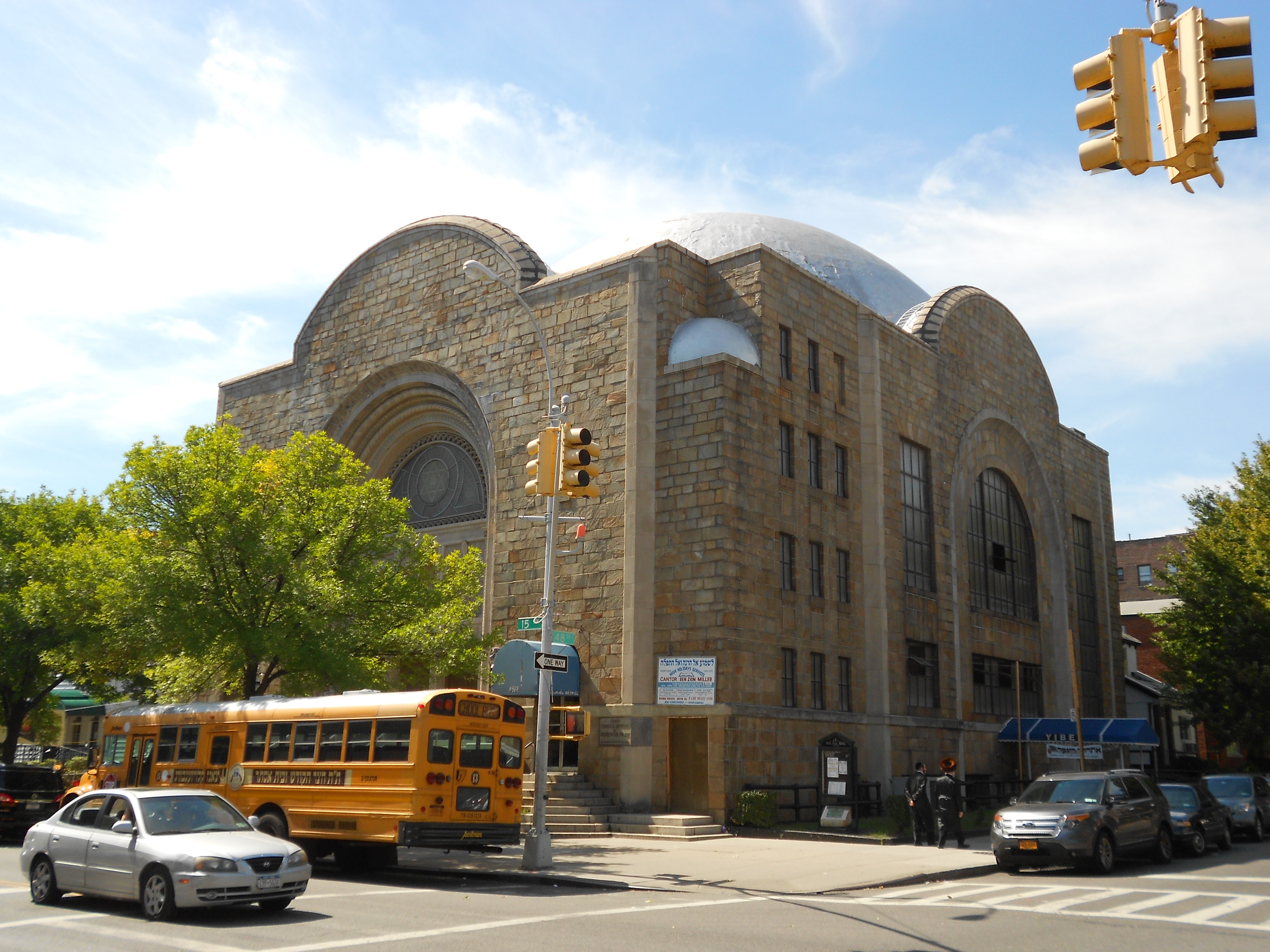
Temple Beth El of Borough Park, a synagogue near Busch's apartment and the shooting

Busch's spiritual quest led him into taking up residence on 46th Street in the Borough Park section of Brooklyn, New York, a neighborhood with a prominent Orthodox Jewish population. At times, Busch would enjoy music, or the quiet grace of celebrating the Shabbat with friends. During other times, when he neglected to take his medication, he wouldn't look up from his prayer book or his food.

In 1997, Busch entered a residential program for the mentally ill in Borough Park, but soon checked himself out, against the advice of doctors, who said they did not believe he was capable of living on his own. He took computer training courses with plans to go into business designing web pages. Busch would often be seen walking around talking to himself, and wearing heavy clothes in mid-summer. He procured a claw hammer, which he called his "staff", carved on it the tetragrammaton, and danced around with it in prayer. He meditated while playing loud music, or prayed so loudly that the neighbors complained.

In the beginning of August 1999, three weeks before his death, Busch met a female acquaintance from Israel, Netanya Ullman, on the New York City Subway, and they decided to get married.

On August 29, 1999, Busch struck a neighbor's passing car with his hammer. When the driver stopped and rolled down his window, Busch swung at him and broke his nose. The neighbor filed a complaint with the police.

== Police shooting and death ==
During the late afternoon of August 30, 1999, neighbors called police complaining that Busch had been playing music too loud, and dancing almost naked in the street. By the time police arrived, he was back inside his basement apartment with a friend, a homeless man named Percy Freeman, with whom Busch had been smoking marijuana. He waved the hammer at them, which may have appeared at first to be a flute.

At 6:40 p.m., police received an anonymous 9-1-1 call about a man living at 1619 46th Street, Busch's address, who was menacing neighborhood children with a hammer. When police arrived, they asked Freeman to leave the apartment. Freeman came up the stairs, and told police "Don't worry about the hammer, it's a religious object," as officers wrestled him to the ground and handcuffed him. The officers called for the Emergency Service Unit, standard procedure in the New York City Police Department in situations involving a mentally disturbed person. They ordered Busch to come out, which he refused to do. Officers then entered the apartment, and tried to contain him. Busch by this time had ceased wearing his prescription glasses, and may not have recognized his intruders as police officers. Busch threatened them with the hammer, and took a swing or two at them. Failing to pacify him, Officer Daniel Gravitch shot a half-ounce of pepper spray in Busch's eyes.

At 6:48:20 p.m., Sergeant Joseph Memoly, just arriving on the scene, put in a second call for the Emergency Service Unit. Busch was either forced outside, or broke free from the officers. According to police, he then ran up a narrow stairway from the apartment, struck Sergeant Terrence O'Brien with the hammer several times on his left arm, then rushed past other officers. He stood on the sidewalk, wearing a tallit and tefillin, with the hammer raised over his head. Six officers who responded to the radio calls stood on their feet, guns drawn, in a rough semicircle around him. They shouted at him, one officer "almost pleading" to drop the hammer. There was a distinct single shot, followed closely by a volley of 12 shots, which were fired by Sergeant Memoly and Officers Martin Sanabria and William Loshiavo, whereupon Busch fell dead. Alternatively, Busch took a step forward, was screaming while swinging the hammer, and kept coming at the officers. He was striking a fallen police sergeant with the hammer when he was shot.

At 6:48:27 p.m., Sergeant O'Brien radioed: "Perp down."

Officers later found strange scribblings on the wall of the apartment. One spelled out the word "POLICE" as "Pointedly Off-wing Litigating Intensely Careful Errand-deliverers."

== Reactions ==
In the aftermath of the killing, many neighborhood residents gathered in the street, chanting "Justice" while occasionally throwing objects at police. Many demanded to know why Mayor Rudy Giuliani did not go to Brooklyn to address their concerns about police brutality. One witness at the scene said of the police, "If I had been in their shoes I would have done the same thing." City Councilman Noach Dear called for an investigation. He said that the police needed to re-examine their methods for dealing with the mentally ill, but there were no easy answers.

At a news conference the following morning at City Hall attended by Mayor Giuliani and Jewish community leaders, Police Commissioner Howard Safir stated that seven independent witnesses confirmed that Busch hit Sergeant O'Brien with the hammer.

== Legal proceedings ==
On November 1, 1999, a Brooklyn grand jury declined to indict the four officers involved in the shooting, citing the fact that Busch presented a threat to the officers, and had refused orders to drop the hammer.

Busch's mother, Doris Busch-Boskey, filed a federal suit through her attorneys, claiming Busch's civil rights had been violated by the officers. However, on June 5, 2001, the Justice Department declined to file charges, announcing instead that they agreed that excessive force had not been used.

== Civil proceedings ==
In October 2003, Busch-Boskey's lawsuit against the NYPD reached Federal Court. However, the Busch family had another setback when on November 17, 2003, the jury supported the police officers' version of the shooting, and found the officers and the city not liable in Busch's death. However, on September 9, 2004, federal judge Sterling Johnson Jr. a former police officer, found serious issues with the police officers' version of the events leading up to Busch's shooting, as well as the truthfulness of their testimony, overturning the jury verdict, and ordering a new trial. The Busch Family declined to pursue another trial for family health reasons, announcing their decision on August 27, 2006. However, they continue to seek justice for Gidone.
