= Kensington, Brooklyn =

Neighborhood in New York City

Coordinates: 40.638528°N 73.973167°W

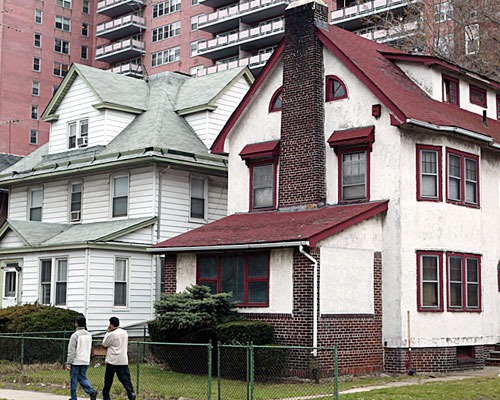
Kensington American Foursquare Houses

Kensington is a neighborhood in the central portion of the New York City borough of Brooklyn, located south of Prospect Park and Green-Wood Cemetery. Kensington and Parkville are bordered by the Prospect Park South and Ditmas Park subsections of Flatbush to the east; Windsor Terrace to the north; Borough Park to the west; and Midwood to the south.

Kensington is a predominantly residential area, with housing types that include brick rowhouses, detached one-family Victorians, and apartment buildings. Pre-war brick apartment buildings dominate the Ocean Parkway and Coney Island Avenue frontage, including many that operate as co-ops. The neighborhood has a diverse population with residents of many ethnicities. The main commercial streets are Coney Island Avenue, Church Avenue, Ditmas Avenue, and McDonald Avenue. Ocean Parkway bisects the neighborhood east–west. Kensington's ZIP Code is 11218 and it is served by the NYPD's 66th Precinct.

== History ==
=== Early history ===
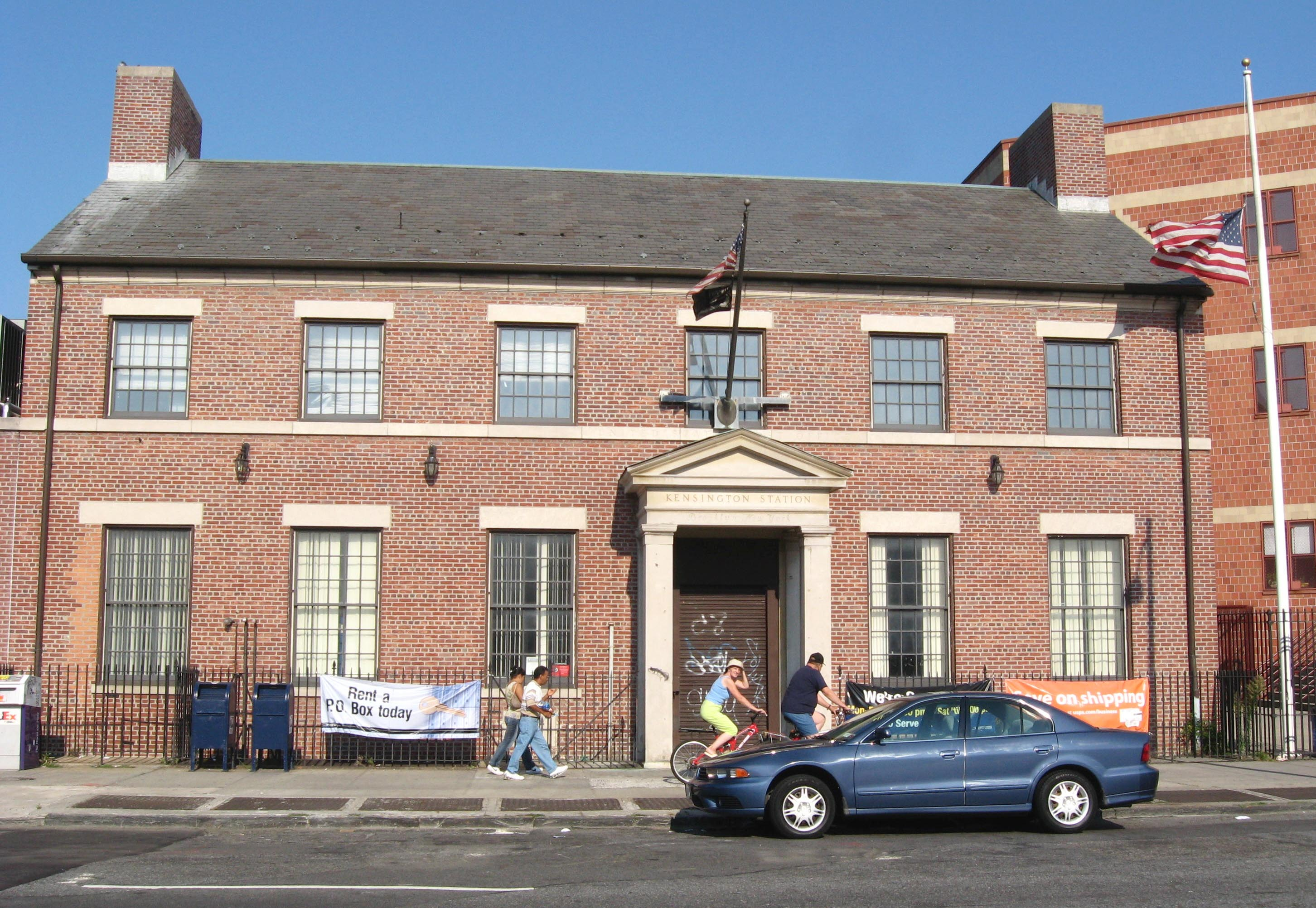
Kensington Post Office, listed on the NRHP

The land where Kensington now sits was first colonized by Dutch farmers during the seventeenth century within the town of Flatbush. It was re-settled by British colonists in 1737. First developed in 1885 after the completion of Ocean Parkway, the neighborhood was named after the place and borough in West London, at the turn of the century.

The small area between 18th and Foster Avenues, in the southern portion of the neighborhood, contains a distinctive, slightly diagonal street grid and is also known as Parkville. The area, originally part of the town of Flatbush, was originally known as Greenville and its land was first acquired in 1852 by the Freeman's Association, shortly after the completion of Coney Island Avenue on the eastern boundary of Kensington and Parkville. Public School 92 (later P.S. 134) and the Roman Catholic Church of St. Rose of Lima were built to service the subsection in 1870. A librarian at the Brooklyn Public Library wrote that "Parkville is one of those wonky neighborhoods that isn't often referenced" because of its small size.

Despite political tensions, the town of Flatbush was annexed by the city of Brooklyn in 1894, presaging the consolidation of the five boroughs of New York City on January 1, 1898. Accordingly, further spates of development occurred in the late 19th and early 20th centuries, much of which was initially concentrated in the village of Windsor Terrace (which had more southerly borders than the contemporary neighborhood, being bounded by Church Avenue on the south, Gravesend [McDonald] Avenue on the west, the historical Brooklyn–Flatbush town line near Terrace Place on the north, and Prospect Park Southwest and Coney Island Avenue on the east). These efforts also encompassed Brooklyn Real Estate Exchange President Jeremiah Johnson, Jr.'s circa 1891 Kensington Heights and circa 1894 Kensington-in-Flatbush developments, the former in the vicinity of Ditmas Avenue and the latter possibly in the vicinity of Church Avenue; detached suburban villas on and adjoining Ocean Parkway that attracted wealthier residents from more urbanized areas, including Brooklyn Heights, Bedford-Stuyvesant and Bushwick; hybrid commercial/walk-up apartment structures on commercial thoroughfares; and a variety of limestone- and brick-fronted townhouse rows.

=== Early and mid-20th century ===
As the area was gradually rezoned amid the construction of the IND Brooklyn Line, six-story elevator apartment houses became increasingly prevalent on upper Ocean Parkway and in its periphery between the late 1920s and 1941, replacing many of the suburban villas. Following World War II, the development of the Prospect Expressway ensured that luxury buildings (by now often exceeding six stories due to building code revisions and further zoning changes, as exemplified by the Marlene J. [later known as the Caton Towers] and the Americana Towers) continued to be developed on Ocean Parkway and in its immediate vicinity until the mid-1960s. Since the 1990s, there has been a notable resurgence in various forms of residential development, including new apartment houses on Ocean Parkway and smaller structures on side streets.

Throughout much of the 20th century, Kensington was seldom distinguished as a distinct neighborhood, with many residents and demographers identifying the area as the western section of Flatbush. The descriptor West Flatbush was also used by various religious & civic organizations and urban planners in the first half of the 20th century before largely falling into disuse after 1954. While the Kensington moniker continued to be employed by branches of certain governmental institutions (including the Post Office Department and the Brooklyn Public Library), it was also used by demographers to differentiate the largely working class, ethnically heterogeneous tracts west of Ocean Parkway from the historically affluent, Old Stock and Jewish American-dominated tracts east of Coney Island Avenue. A 1945 fifteen-year retrospective study of Brooklyn Protestantism by the Committee for Cooperative Field Research included the Kensington tracts between the historical villages of Windsor Terrace and Parkville (alternatively characterized as the "Ocean Parkway corridor") within the boundaries of Flatbush, also noting that a contemporaneous survey of 3,072 families indicated that 41% of residents identified as Roman Catholic (exemplified by a recent influx of second and third-generation Italian Americans from South Brooklyn and other northern neighborhoods), 33% as Jewish (primarily concentrated in apartment houses on "main traffic ways") and 26% as Protestant, with the latter population remaining concentrated in "private dwellings on the side streets" amid an ongoing decline. In his 2015 memoir, musician Marky Ramone (who resided at 640 Ditmas Avenue throughout much of his childhood in the 1960s) noted the area's distance from major thoroughfares in eastern Flatbush, necessitating a two-fare public transit zone via bus to Erasmus Hall High School.

Beginning in the 1950s, demographic shifts in eastern Flatbush — exemplified by white flight among the Jewish American community and the concomitant emergence of an Afro-Caribbean immigrant community in the vicinity of Flatbush Avenue — would contrast with comparative stability in the Kensington tracts, notwithstanding the effects of a decade-long population decline likely stemming from a variety of factors, including the beginning of post-Levittown mass suburbanization and the broader amelioration of New York City's postwar housing shortage. In 1956, the closure and ensuing "bustitution" of the Church Avenue streetcar line irrevocably altered a longstanding facet of the neighborhood's public transit landscape.

=== Recognition as separate neighborhood and increasing diversity ===
Although New York City Deputy Municipal Reference Librarian Thelma E. Smith described the Kensington tracts from McDonald Avenue to Coney Island Avenue as a "sub-neighborhood" of Flatbush in a 1966 annotated bibliography of neighborhood histories and reportage for city officials, The New York Times would characterize Ocean Parkway as the western boundary of Flatbush in early 1968. Shortly thereafter, the New York City municipal government informally designated the tracts between McDonald and Coney Island Avenues as Kensington in the 1969 Plan for New York City. Similarly, Gilbert Tauber and Samuel Kaplan asserted that southern Windsor Terrace, the traditional Kensington tracts and western Midwood constituted the sprawling neighborhood of "Kensington-Ocean Parkway" in The New York City Handbook, first published by Doubleday in 1966. (Indeed, after the contemporary community boards of New York City were established in 1963, much of present-day Kensington was appended to the Borough Park-dominated Brooklyn Community Board 12, possibly stemming from Kensington Democratic leader Howard Golden's affiliation with Borough Park's then-powerful Roosevelt Club. Conversely, the eastern Flatbush and Midwood tracts were incorporated into Brooklyn Community Board 14, a division that endures to the present.)

Although the formation of such community organizations as the Kensington-Flatbush Preservation Association would further popularize the moniker throughout the 1970s, press accounts continued to describe the area as Flatbush. In April 1973, Brooklyn Borough President Sebastian Leone said that planned renovations of upper Ocean Parkway (along with a smaller portion in contemporary Midwood) "[would] be an asset to the Flatbush community." Brooklyn-born sports journalist Stan Fischler also identified the IND Church Avenue station as being located in Flatbush in Uptown, Downtown, his 1976 history of the New York City subway system. Reflecting this transitional milieu, the area surrounding a March 1977 gas station shootout at 417 Dahill Road was alternatively characterized as being part of Borough Park (by reporters Thomas Raftery and Paul Meskil) and as a "worn section of Flatbush" (by columnist Pete Hamill) on the same page of the New York Daily News.

During this period, the Kensington tracts began to experience significant demographic changes. Most of the area's long-endangered mainline Protestant churches (including the historically prominent Prospect Park Baptist Church) were forced to close due to a lack of parishioners, while the area's deeply-rooted Irish American community continued to be supplanted by new waves of upwardly mobile Italian Americans moving out from less desirable sections of central and northern Brooklyn, paralleling developments in nearby Sunset Park. In a 1974 interview with Wendy Schuman of The New York Times, a banker opined that Ocean Parkway "just [wasn't] prestigious anymore" as younger residents fully embraced suburbanization, leaving a substantial and rapidly aging white ethnic population (most of whom settled in the area between the early 1930s and the early 1950s) that proved reluctant to move due to New York's favorable rent regulation laws. Another resident who recently moved to Ocean Parkway cited the area's perceived isolation from eastern Flatbush, by now a predominantly Caribbean American community, as his impetus for relocation: "I'm a bigot. I don't care how much money they have. I'm not going to live with Blacks and Puerto Ricans. I'll move out and keep on moving. Five years ago I would have punched a guy in the nose for talking like this."

By the early 1980s, the Kensington designation was rapidly adopted by real estate interests as these tenants (who often identified as Flatbush residents) began to die or retire elsewhere, leading to a greater awareness of the name through a surfeit of advertising. During this period, the area became desirable to a wide range of New Yorkers (including young professionals adversely affected by gentrification in such neighborhoods as Park Slope and Tribeca; Orthodox Jews, African Americans and Hispanic and Latino Americans from Borough Park, eastern Flatbush and other nearby neighborhoods; and a variety of post-1965 immigrant communities, including substantial Eastern European and South Asian enclaves) as a dual locus of relatively affordable rentals amid the city's burgeoning co-op conversion movement, further entrenching the notion of Kensington as a discrete neighborhood among new residents. In 1983, The New York Times described the Ocean Parkway boundary as a vestigial border in a feature about the Community Board 14 tracts of Flatbush. Nevertheless, City College of New York and CUNY Graduate Center sociologist William B. Helmreich included Kensington within the boundaries of Flatbush (while acknowledging its unique demographic mix and comparatively downscale architectural profile) in The Brooklyn Nobody Knows (2016). Additionally, members of "frum" Orthodox Jewish communities in the area frequently extend the boundaries of Flatbush to an area that corresponds to (and often exceeds) the pre-consolidation township, including contemporary Kensington and Midwood.

== Boundaries ==
There are no official boundaries for New York neighborhoods. (Note: New York City deliberately does not have official neighborhood borders, with a spokesperson for the city's planning department saying in 2023 that the city leaves the delineation "up to New Yorkers themselves.") A 2001 New York Times article gave the borders as Caton Avenue and Fort Hamilton Parkway to the north; 36th Street, Dahill Avenue, and 47th Street to the west; Foster Avenue to the south; and Coney Island Avenue to the east. The 2010 edition of The Encyclopedia of New York City gives slightly different borders, moving the western boundary one block east to Macdonald Avenue, and extending the southern boundary slightly to Avenue H.

== Demographics ==
Based on data from the 2010 United States census, the population of Kensington-Ocean Parkway was 36,891, a decrease of 46 (0.1%) from the 36,937 counted in 2000. Covering an area of 364.84 acres (147.65 ha), the neighborhood had a population density of 101.1 inhabitants per acre (64,700/sq mi; 25,000/km^{2}).

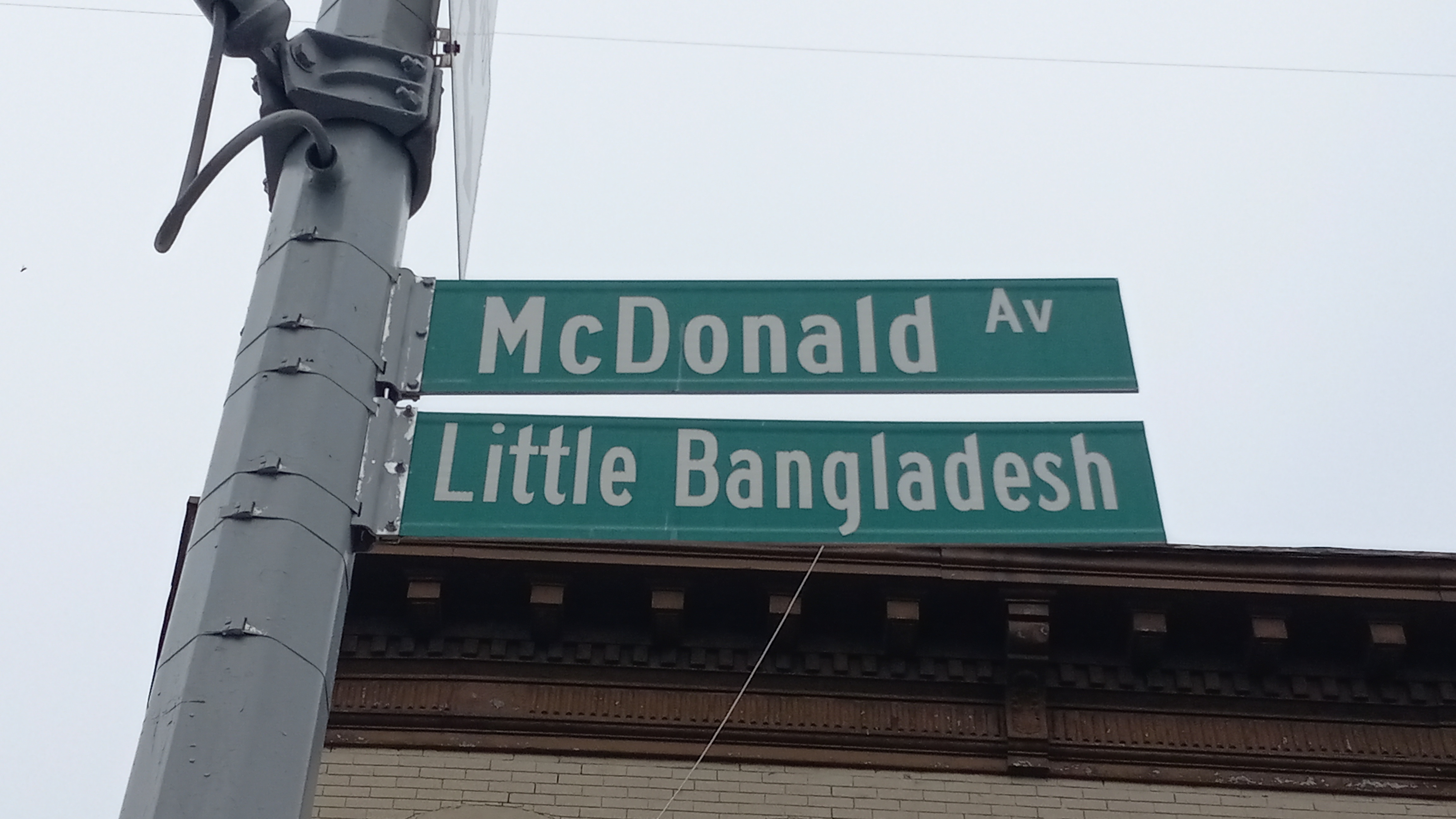
Little Bangladesh street sign on McDonald Avenue in 2024

The racial makeup of the neighborhood was 47.9% (17,686) White, 6.9% (2,558) African American, 0.1% (49) Native American, 24.1% (8,879) Asian, 0.0% (9) Pacific Islander, 0.7% (274) from other races, and 2.5% (926) from two or more races. Hispanic or Latino of any race were 17.6% (6,510) of the population.

Kensington is a very ethnically diverse neighborhood, consisting of South Asian (Bangladeshi and Pakistani), Orthodox Jewish (Hasidic), Uzbek, Latin American, Polish, and Ukrainian communities. The intersection of McDonald and Church Avenues was co-named Little Bangladesh in October 2022 in recognition of the area's large and growing Bangladeshi community.

The 2020 census data from New York City Department of City Planning showed each the White and Asian population ranges are roughly equal with each of their population being at between 10,000 and 19,999 residents. In addition, there were 5,000 to 9,999 Hispanic residents; however, the Black residents were fewer than 5,000.

== Transportation ==
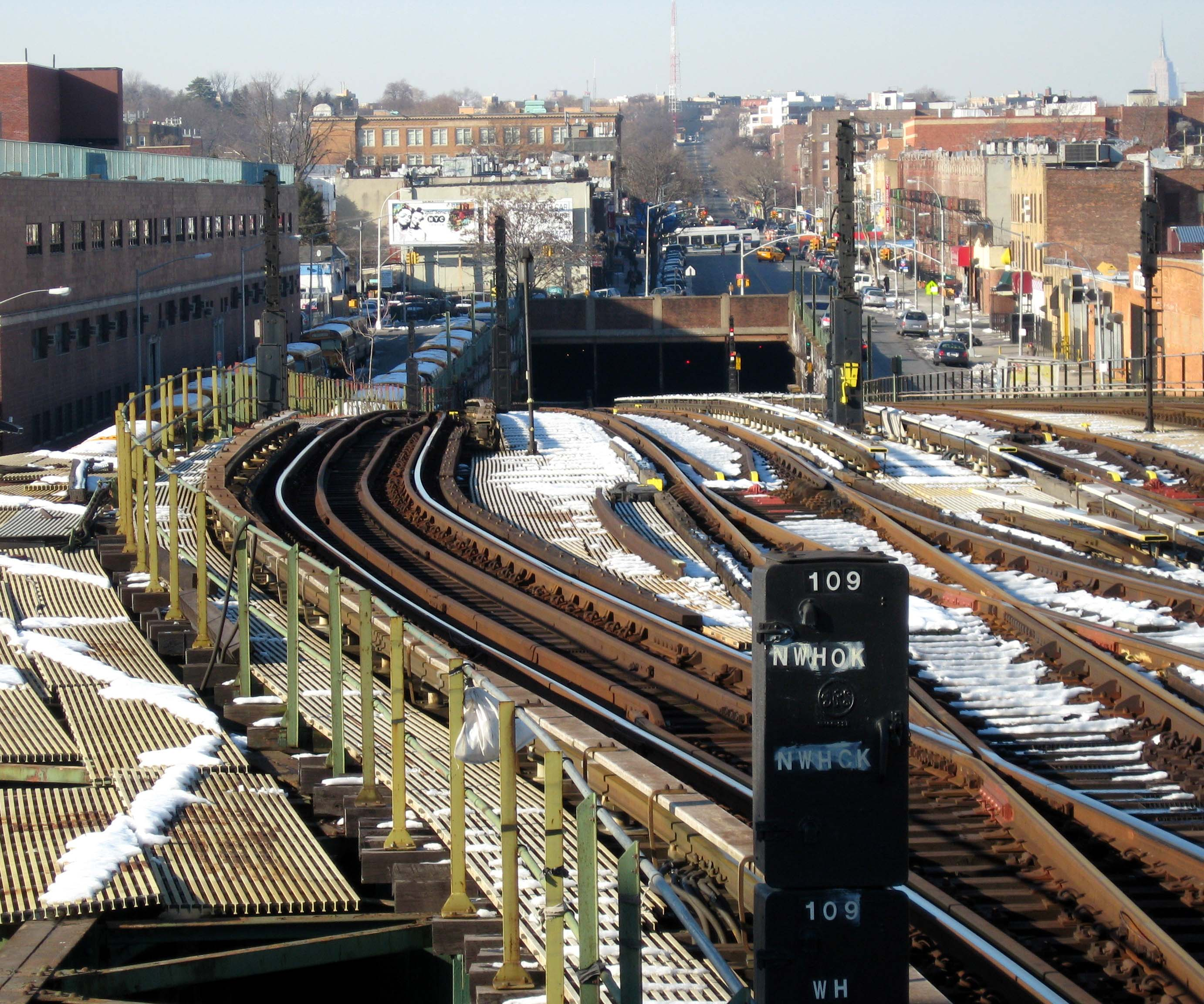
The Culver Ramp takes the IND Culver Line from a tunnel to an elevated structure.

The New York City Subway's IND Culver Line (F, <F>, and G trains) runs along the western part of the neighborhood and stops underground at Fort Hamilton Parkway and at Church Avenue. The line rises above ground to an elevated structure (F and <F> trains) to serve the Ditmas Avenue and 18th Avenue stations. In addition, Kensington is served by the B8, B16, B35, B67, B68, B69, B103 local buses, as well as the BM1, BM2, BM3, BM4 express buses to Manhattan.

== Education ==
=== Library ===
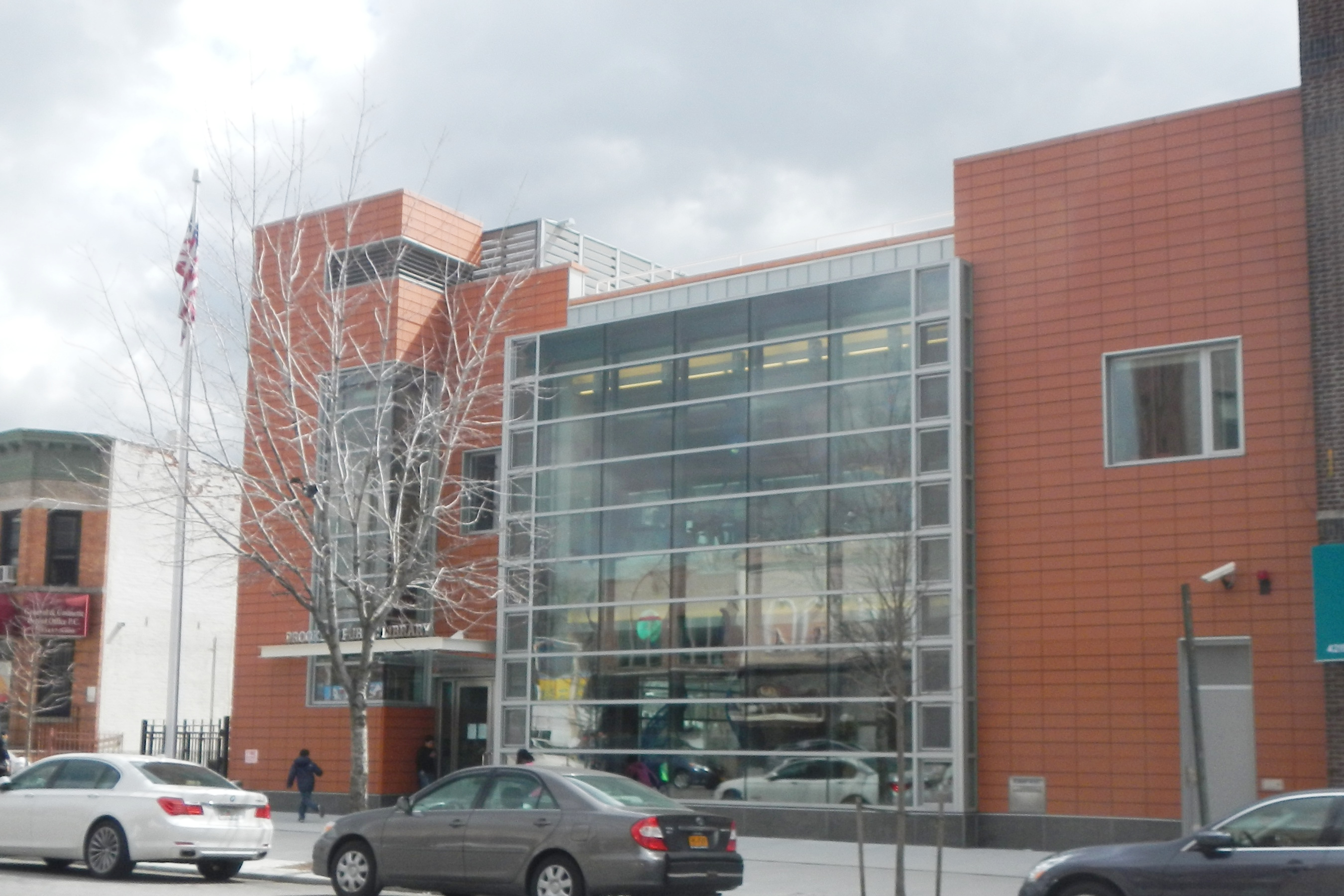
18th Avenue library

The Kensington branch of the Brooklyn Public Library is located at 4207 18th Avenue, near the intersection of Seton Place and East Second Street. It was originally created in 1908 as a "deposit station" with a small collection, and was located at P.S. 134, three blocks east of the current library. Within four years, it had moved twice, and in 1912, it relocated to 770 McDonald Avenue, at the southwest corner of Ditmas Avenue. The library moved again in 1960 to a location four blocks east, on 410 Ditmas Avenue, between East 4th & East 5th Streets. The current facility opened in 2012 at 4207 18th Avenue.

=== Schools ===
Public schools in Kensington include four public primary schools: P.S. 130 (shared with Windsor Terrace), P.S. 230, P.S. 179, and P.S. 134. There are three middle schools: M.S. 839, J.H.S. 62 and J.H.S. 23. The area has no public high schools. There is also an Orthodox Jewish school called Yeshiva Torah Vodaas.

== Notable people ==
- Yisroel Belsky (1938–2016) Rosh Yeshiva of Yeshiva Torah Vodaas a senior kashrut advisor at the Orthodox Union And a leading Jewish halachic decisor.
- Bryce Dessner (born 1976), composer and guitarist.
- Jo Freeman (born 1945), feminist scholar.
- Paul Giannone, founder of the eponymous Paulie Gee's pizzeria in Greenpoint, Brooklyn, New York. Raised in Kensington.
- Shahana Hanif (born 1991), New York City Council representative of the 39th district
- Sid Luckman (1916–1998), Hall of Fame quarterback for the Chicago Bears from 1939 to 1950; led them to four NFL championships. According to the 1940 Federal Census, Luckman lived at 318 East 8th Street in Kensington.
- Bruce Morrow (born 1935), radio disc jockey known as "Cousin Brucie."
- Marky Ramone, (born 1952), drummer for the Ramones
- Gedalia Schorr (1910–1979) Rosh Yeshiva of Yeshiva Torah Vodaas and a leading Jewish scholar.
- Albert Shanker (1928–1997), president of the United Federation of Teachers from 1964 to 1985 and president of the American Federation of Teachers (AFT) from 1974 to 1997.
- Sufjan Stevens (born 1975), singer-songwriter and multi-instrumentalist.
- Frank Terpil (1939–2016), rogue CIA agent, arms trader, international felon.
- Qian Julie Wang (born 1987), civil rights lawyer and author of Beautiful Country.
- Nisson Wolpin (1932–2008), editor of The Jewish Observer
- Eric Wong, American music executive
