= Clarence Norman Jr. =

American politician

Deputy Speaker of the New York State Assembly
- In office 2003 – Sept 27, 2005
- Preceded by: Arthur Eve
- Succeeded by: Ivan C. Lafayette

Member of the New York State Assembly from the 43rd district
- In office January 1, 1983 – September 27, 2005
- Preceded by: Rhoda S. Jacobs
- Succeeded by: Karim Camara

Personal details
- Born: August 25, 1951 (age 75)
- Party: Democratic
- Profession: politician

Clarence Norman Jr. (born August 25, 1951) is a former American politician from the state of New York. He was the former chairman of the Kings County Democratic Party and member of the New York State Assembly from the 43rd Assembly District in Central Brooklyn, which includes Crown Heights and parts of Flatbush and Prospect Heights.

He was convicted of three felony counts of accepting illegal campaign contributions during his 2000 and 2002 re-election campaigns for his seat in the New York State Assembly and served time in prison.

== Early years ==
Norman was one of five children of the Rev. Clarence Norman Sr., a politically influential head pastor of the First Baptist Church of Crown Heights, and his wife, Ellen.

== Career ==
After earning degrees from Howard University and St. John's School of Law he entered politics, first serving as general counsel to the New York State Assembly Subcommittee on Probation and Parole. He later served in the Kings County District Attorney's office for five years as an Assistant District Attorney in the felony bureau.

=== Election to New York State Assembly ===
In November 1982, Norman was elected to the New York State Assembly for the first time, representing the 43rd District in Central Brooklyn, which included Crown Heights and parts of Flatbush and Prospect Heights. He was a member of the Assembly from 1983 to 2005, sitting in the 185th, 186th, 187th, 188th, 189th, 190th, 191st, 192nd, 193rd, 194th, 195th and 196th New York State Legislatures.

After being re-elected easily from an overwhelmingly Democratic district several times, the first major challenge to Norman's political power base in Brooklyn came in 1998, when New York City police officer, minister, and future City Councilman James E. Davis ran against him in a Democratic primary. Although Norman was victorious in that race, he was re-elected by only 580 votes, a relatively slim margin of 55% to 45%, which signaled the first chinks in his previously impregnable political armor.

=== Party leadership ===
He served as District Leader from 1986 to 1993. In 1990, Norman became the first African-American, and the youngest Democrat, to be elected as chairman of the Executive Committee of the Kings County Democratic County Committee. Heading the largest county Democratic organization in the country, Norman became an influential power broker, on municipal, statewide, and national levels.

In addition to being a member of the Assembly for 23 years, and head of the Kings County Democratic Party for 15, Norman also held other positions within the city, state, and national Democratic Party, including being a delegate to the Democratic National Convention in 2000 and 2004, a Presidential Elector from New York in 2000, a member of the Democratic National Committee from New York in 2004, and Assistant Majority Leader of the New York State Assembly beginning in 2001.

== Criminal cases ==
The investigation into Norman's campaign practices stemmed from an inquiry in 2003 by Kings County District Attorney Charles "Joe" Hynes that originally targeted judicial corruption and veered into numerous allegations of judgeships in Kings County being sold to wealthy campaign donors within the Democratic Party.

A Brooklyn judge, Gerald P. Garson, was accused of bribery by taking money from an attorney to rig the outcome of divorce and child custody cases that he was hearing. He informed investigators that he was aware of a much broader scheme whereby prospective candidates purchased their seats on the bench. In an attempt to secure evidence to support his allegation and to reduce his sentence, Garson agreed to go undercover to capture Norman and others on tape. The judge wore a wire for nearly a year without obtaining incriminating evidence against Norman.

While Garson's bribery case was under way, a report appeared in the New York Post that a former Brooklyn judge allegedly was asked to pay more than $100,000 to stay on the bench - and then lost her seat after she refused. “Congressman Ed Towns and a lawyer who handled his election matters in 2000, Bernard "Mitch" Alter, allegedly asked Judge Maxine Archer for $160,000.” When approached, Alter did not deny the claim, but stated that it was $140,000 for campaign expenses. Alter confirmed that he submitted an estimate requesting $56,000 for petitioning, mailing and Election Day operations, plus $54,000 in consulting fees. The Post went on to say, "the Brooklyn District Attorney's Office was interested in speaking with Archer as part of an ongoing grand jury probe into the reported sales of judgeships in Kings County."

Nothing came of the allegations made against Alter and Congressman Towns. When it was heard that Hynes was dropping the investigation against Norman, two female judges, Karen Yellen and Marcia Sikowitz, angered about the results of their 2001 campaigns, complained to Hynes that Norman told them to come up with $100,000 or lose the party nod. The implication was that Norman had bullied them into using a preferred printer and extorting money from them. The complaints caused Hynes' office to shift from investigating judicial corruption to concentrating on the sale of judgeships. Hynes eventually narrowed his investigation to Norman's campaign practices.

In April 2003, Hynes alleged that the system through which candidates for New York State Supreme Court judgeships were selected was not democratic, and essentially involved an exchange of seats in return for campaign contributions to prominent Democratic Party officeholders and power brokers.

=== Original indictment ===
On October 9, 2003, Norman was indicted on charges of misappropriating campaign funds and improperly claiming more than $5,000 in travel expenses that were reimbursed by taxpayers. Norman said that Hynes's inquiry was a result of a failed investigation into other areas and that he had no plans to resign from his county Democratic post or his Assembly seat. However, several weeks later, an additional indictment with charges regarding the sale of the judgeships in Kings County was filed against Norman.

=== First two convictions ===
After several of the charges were dropped and numerous delays, Norman went to trial, and was convicted of two felony counts of violating New York State campaign laws by soliciting illegal contributions in his 2000 and 2002 primary campaigns, and one felony and one misdemeanor count of falsifying business records of those contributions.

On trial for a second set of charges several months later, Norman was convicted again, this time on larceny for putting a $5,000 check made out to his assembly campaign into a personal account. He was sentenced to a prison term of 2 to 6 years for the convictions in both trials.

=== Acquittal ===
There were still several remaining charges. On March 24, 2006, Norman was acquitted of stealing over $5,000 by claiming reimbursement for travel expenses between the state capital (Albany) and Brooklyn, which involved a motor vehicle that the Kings County Democratic Party had paid for. This was his first acquittal in three trials.

=== Final conviction ===
Norman still faced prosecution on a fourth charge from the initial investigation - accusations of extortion involving prospective judicial candidates. On February 23, 2007, Norman was convicted for the third time in his four criminal trials, this time for grand larceny and extortion. Prosecutors said he had coerced the two women candidates for civil court judge to pay thousands of dollars to certain campaign consultants and a specific printer of campaign materials with ties to Norman, or lose the Democratic party support in the 2002 primary. He was acquitted on five other counts of the original indictment. He was sentenced to 1 to 3 years on this charge, to be served after the first sentence.

=== Penalties ===
As a result of his convictions, Norman was forced to resign as chairman of the Kings County Democratic Party, was expelled from the New York State Assembly, and was disbarred. He began serving prison time on June 5, 2007, and was released to the Division of Parole from Manhattan's Lincoln Correctional Facility on March 14, 2011. He was discharged from parole one year later.

Despite his criminal convictions, Norman still collects an annual pension of $43,000 from New York State.

== Successors ==
After his conviction, a special election was held to determine Norman's successor as Assemblyman. Karim Camara, a member of the church where Clarence Norman Sr. was pastor, won overwhelmingly, defeating two opponents, one of whom was the brother of former City Councilman and Norman rival James E. Davis.

Assemblyman Vito Lopez eventually replaced Norman as leader of the Kings County Democratic Party. Lopez eventually resigned from both his assembly seat and Kings County Democratic party leadership position after being censured by the Assembly for sexual harassment and being fined $330,000.

== See also ==
- Gerald Garson, New York State Supreme Court judge who was part of the sting to catch Norman
- Kings County Democratic Committee

New York State Assembly
Preceded by Arthur Eve	New York State Assembly; Deputy Speaker; 2003-2005	Succeeded by Ivan C. Lafayette
Preceded by Rhoda S. Jacobs	New York State Assembly; 43rd District; 1983–2005	Succeeded by Karim Camara
Party political offices
Preceded by Howard Golden	Chairman of the Kings County Democratic Committee; 1990–2005	Succeeded by Vito J. Lopez
