= Diana Richardson =

American politician

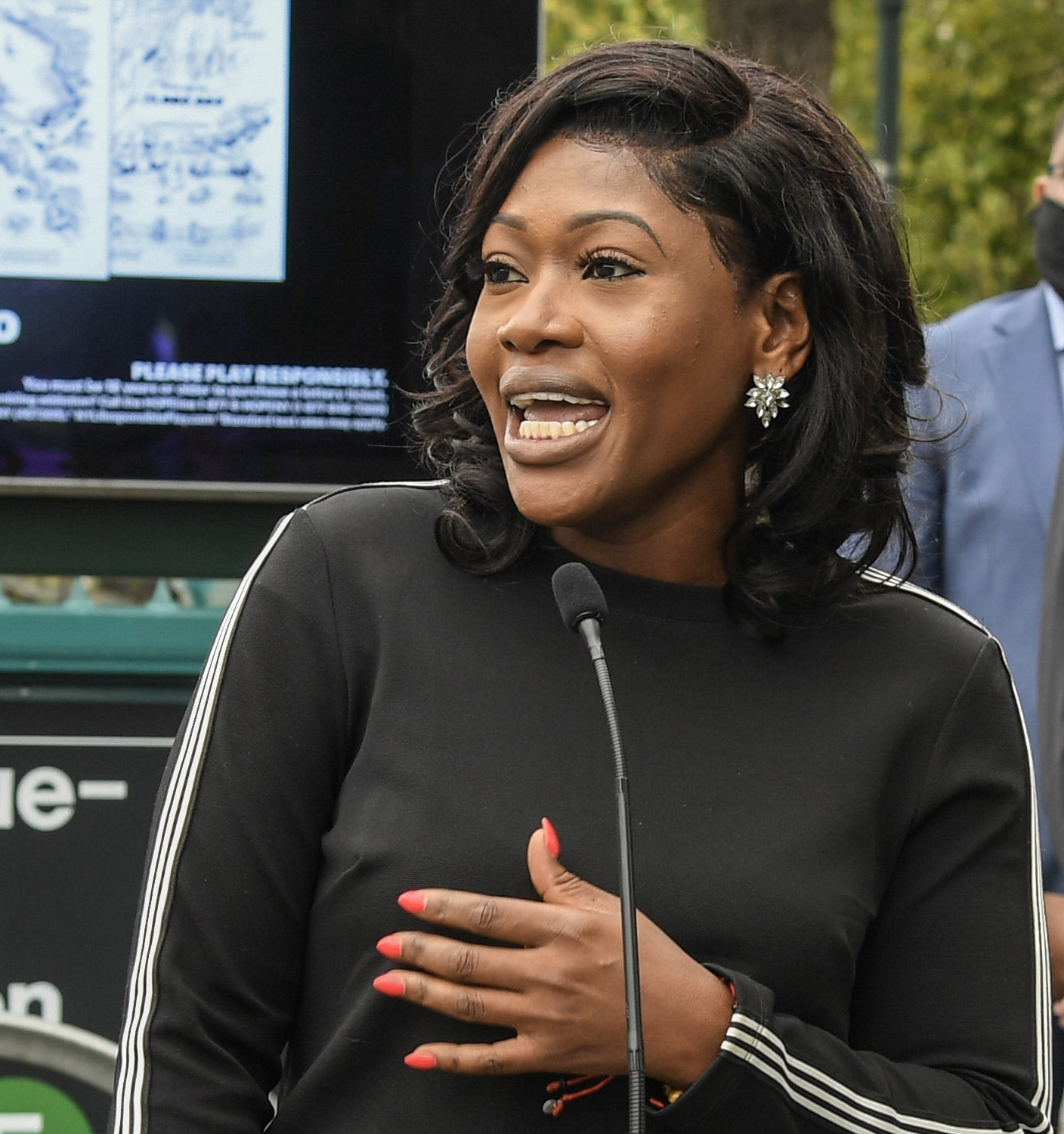

Deputy Borough President of Brooklyn
- In office January 1, 2022 – October 17, 2022
- Leader: Antonio Reynoso
- Preceded by: Ingrid Lewis-Martin
- Succeeded by: Kimberly “Kim” Council

Member of the New York State Assembly from the 43rd district
- In office May 6, 2015 – February 4, 2022
- Preceded by: Karim Camara
- Succeeded by: Brian A. Cunningham

Personal details
- Born: January 16, 1983 (age 43) Brooklyn, New York, U.S.
- Party: Democratic
- Other political affiliations: Working Families
- Spouse: Zellnor Myrie (m. 2024)
- Children: 1
- Education: Medgar Evers College (BA); Baruch College (MPA)

Diana Richardson (born January 16, 1983) is an American former Democratic politician who served as a member of the New York Assembly. She was elected on the progressive Working Families Party line in a 2015 special election to replace Karim Camara in the 43rd district, which comprised the Crown Heights and Prospect Lefferts Gardens neighborhoods of Brooklyn. She also served as the deputy Brooklyn borough president for ten months in 2022 before she was fired following a string of staff and constituent complaints for creating a toxic work environment.

== Early life and education ==
Richardson was born in Brooklyn, to immigrant parents who came to the US from Aruba in the Caribbean in the 1960s, and raised in Crown Heights. She attended Edward R. Murrow High School.

Richardson has an undergraduate degree in public administration from Medgar Evers College and a Master of Public Administration from Baruch College, both campuses of the City University of New York.

== Career ==
Richardson was a Brooklyn Community Board 9 member when the Crown Heights Tenant Union, an advocacy organization for tenants that organizes, educations, and helps residents in housing court cases, encouraged her to run for an open New York Assembly seat on platform of "expanding tenants’ rights and rejecting real estate money."

=== 2015–2020 ===
She won the May 2015 special election in the 43rd State Assembly district with just over 50% of the vote, on the progressive Working Families Party (WFP) ballot line, the first to do so in the state legislature. She also won the general election the following November, on both the Democratic Party line as well as the WFP.

In 2016, Richardson was arrested for hitting her 12-year-old son with a broomstick, leaving bruises on his arm, and was charged with second-degree assault (a felony), endangering the welfare of a child, criminal possession of a weapon, and menacing. She was released from police custody with a temporary order of protection against her, and her son was staying with a relative. The felony charge was dropped in April 2017, though she still faced six misdemeanor charges. Four years later, she wrote on social media: "I'll just call it what it is. I beat him."

In 2018, she reportedly threw a "serious temper tantrum, verbally attacking" Assembly Speaker Carl Heastie during a meeting."

During her reelection run for New York State Assembly in 2020, Richardson accused the leader of the Brooklyn Democratic Party, Rodneyse Bichotte Hermelyn, and the other members of the Brooklyn Democratic Party of supporting her opponent in the primary, former State Senator Jesse Hamilton.

In 2020, Richardson was pepper-sprayed by the New York City Police Department while marching at a demonstration over the murder of George Floyd.

=== 2021–present ===
In January 2022, Brooklyn Borough President Antonio Reynoso selected Richardson to be the deputy borough president.

On October 17, 2022, Richardson was fired by Reynoso for creating a toxic work environment, following a string of staff and constituent complaints about her behavior while she was working at Brooklyn Borough Hall. She had reportedly berated and cursed staff, had to be pulled away from a fight with a Crown Heights anti-violence program director before it became violent, set off smoke alarms in her Borough Hall office, refused to use email, and ignored COVID-19 precautions.

== Personal life ==
In November 2022, City & State NY reported that Richardson was engaged to New York State Senator Zellnor Myrie. In February 2024, Myrie announced they had married, though he did not disclose the wedding date.

Political offices
Preceded by Karim Camara	New York Assembly, 43rd District; 2015–2022	Succeeded by Brian A. Cunningham
