= Rhoda S. Jacobs =

American politician (born 1936)

Member of the New York State Assembly from the 42nd district
- In office January 1, 1983 – December 31, 2014
- Preceded by: Harry Smoler
- Succeeded by: Rodneyse Bichotte Hermelyn

Member of the New York State Assembly from the 43rd district
- In office January 1, 1979 – December 31, 1982
- Preceded by: George A. Cincotta
- Succeeded by: Clarence Norman Jr.

Personal details
- Born: September 29, 1936 (age 89) Brooklyn, New York City, New York
- Party: Democratic

Rhoda S. Jacobs (born September 29, 1936) is an American politician from New York. A Democrat, she was until 2014 a member of the New York State Assembly from the 42nd Assembly District in Brooklyn, which primarily includes the neighborhoods of Flatbush, Brooklyn and Midwood.

A Brooklyn native and a graduate of Brooklyn College, Assemblywoman Jacobs was originally elected to the then 43rd District in 1978. Jacobs faced a difficult re-election in 1982 after the Assembly districts were re-apportioned to increase African-American and Hispanic representation in the Legislature. Jacobs ended up in the new 42nd District where she prevailed and remained there until 2014, sitting in the 183rd, 184th, 185th, 186th, 187th, 188th, 189th, 190th, 191st, 192nd, 193rd, 194th, 195th, 196th, 197th, 198th, 199th and 200th New York State Legislatures.

She served at times as the Assistant Speaker of the New York State Assembly, as Assistant Speaker pro tempore and Chairwoman of the Majority Program Committee as well as the Social Services Committee, which latter positions she occupied for two and twelve years respectively.

In the past, she has also served as the Chair of the Assembly Committee on Oversight, Analysis and Investigation and the Task Force on Food, Farm and Nutrition Policy. In 1997, Jacobs was appointed as Chairwoman of the Budget Conference Committee on Health and Human Services.

In addition to these positions within the Assembly, she has also served as an officer for the National Association of State Legislators and as an elected delegate to other national legislative bodies.

New York State Assembly
Preceded by George A. Cincotta	New York State Assembly; 43rd District; 1979–1982	Succeeded by Clarence Norman Jr.
Preceded by Harry Smoler	New York State Assembly; 42nd District; 1983–2014	Succeeded by Rodneyse Bichotte
