= Ezras Nashim =

Volunteer Jewish All-Female EMT

- Founded: 2012
- Key people: Rachel Freier, Allen W. Cherson
- Website: https://www.ezrasnashim.org

Ezras Nashim is an all-female Orthodox Jewish volunteer EMT ambulance service established with the goal of preserving women's modesty in emergency medical situations, especially childbirth, the group has 50 volunteers on-call 24/7 for women, or anyone else who needs them.

== History ==
The group was formed after its request to add a female corps of EMT volunteers to the all-male Hatzalah organization, the long-standing Orthodox Jewish EMT service in New York City, was rejected. Hatzalah was the subject of controversy as articles in the New York Post and JEMS Magazine criticize the organization for its discriminatory practice of not allowing women to join. The group of Orthodox women cited the need for modesty and sensitivity to the needs of fellow Orthodox women.

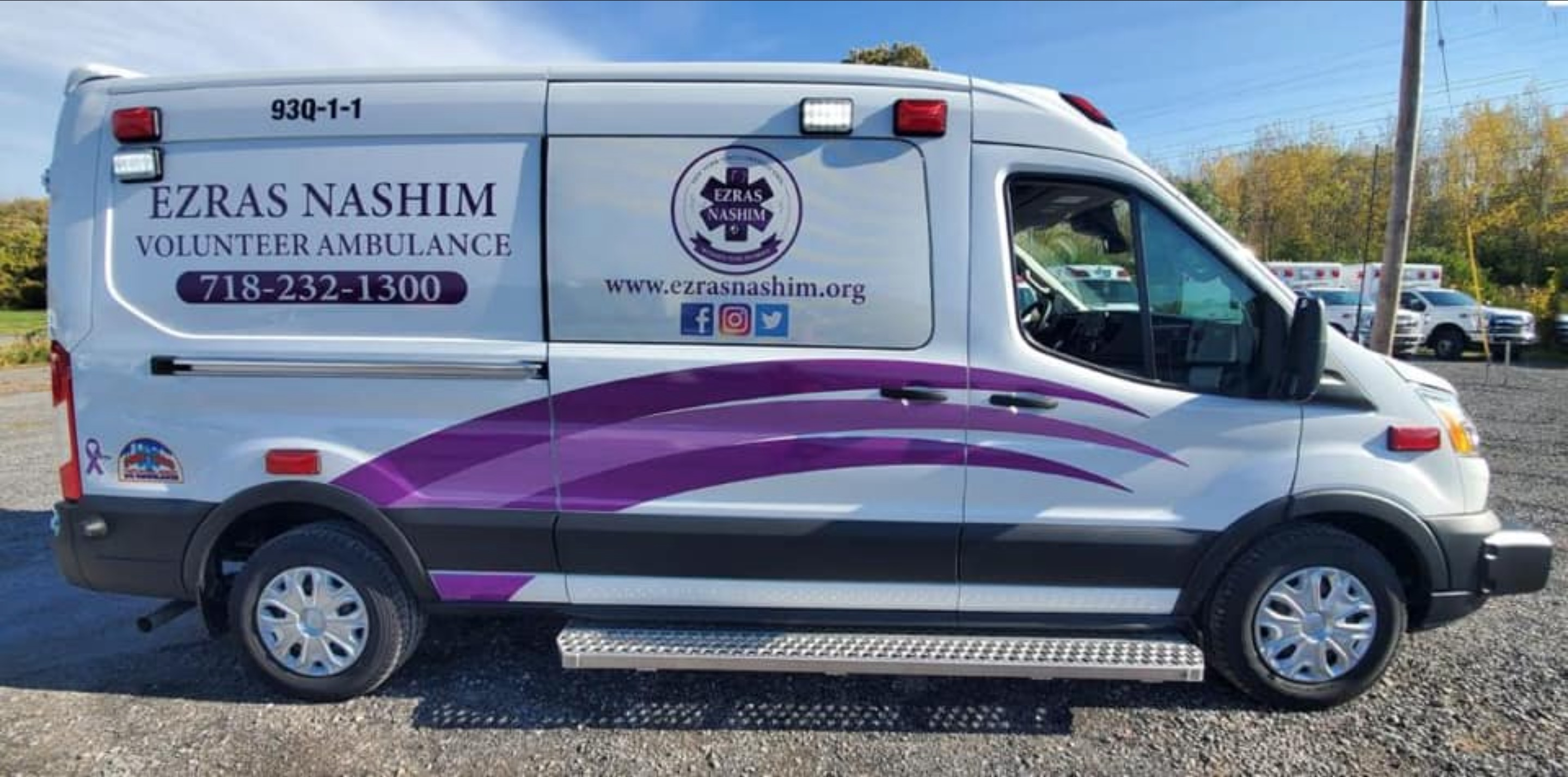
Ezras Nashim's New Ambulance

Rachel Freier worked on a project to buy an ambulance for the organization after having been initially approached about the idea for the organization in the summer of 2011. Freier initially provided advocacy services for the group, and took over the directorship of the organization in 2012.

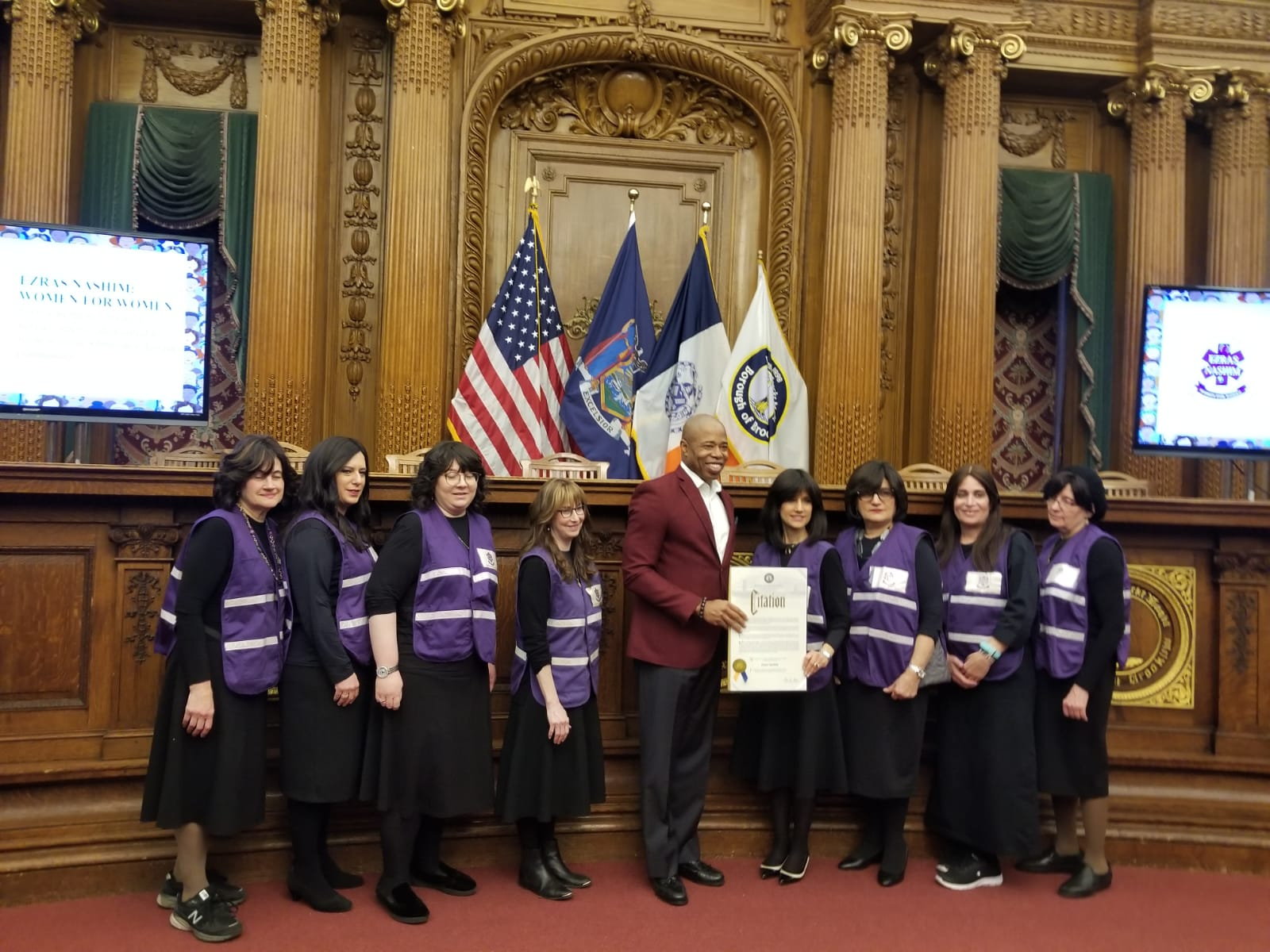
Mayor Eric Adams honors Ezras Nashim for “Women's History Month” at Brooklyn Borough Hall

=== Branches ===
- Borough Park
- Monsey
- Flatbush
- Five Towns
- Stern College for Women

=== Licensing ===
Ezras Nashim was licensed by the New York State Department of Health in February 2013, though the volunteer corps respond in their own private vehicles as Ezras Nashim is still awaiting a license to operate a full ambulance service. In October 2019, a public hearing was held over Ezras Nashim's ambulance license at The EMS Council (REMSCO) of NYC.

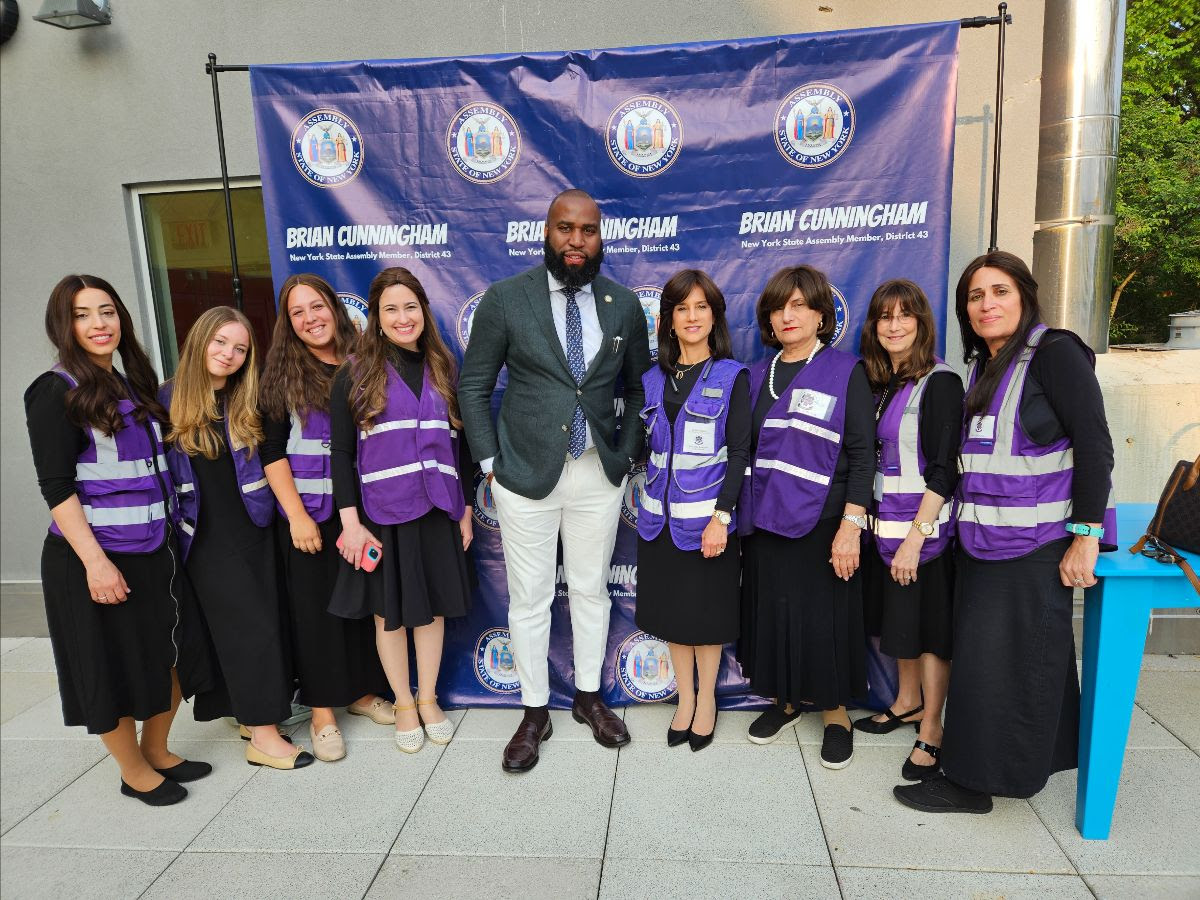
Assemblyman Brian Cunningham honors Ezras Nashim with the “2023 Women of Distinction Award”

In November 2019, The Council did not approve the motion, a failure of either side to produce a majority of 14 votes to either pass the motion or deny it. Therefore, the case moved up to the NY State EMS Council for a Decision.

In July 2020, a hearing was held at The NY State Council (SEMSCO) in Albany,

In August 2020, the entire council overwhelmingly approved the ambulance application for Ezras Nashim in a 23-2 vote.

In October 2020, the group raised funds and purchased and their first-ever ambulance, designed white with vivid purple stripes, which bears the Ezras Nashim logo in both English and Hebrew.

In December 2020, Ezras Nashim received their official ambulance certification from the New York State Department of Health and began operating the ambulance for medical emergency calls.

In January 2020, Rachel Freier along with a delegation of Ezras Nashim members were honored in front of the entire New York State Assembly in the Assembly Chambers of the New York State Capitol Building in Albany, a resolution was passed recognizing the EMT members for their volunteer efforts of preserving women’s dignity during emergencies,

In April 2021, Ezras Nashim was featured in The New York Times for recruiting dozens of Orthodox Jewish women and training them to be EMT medical professionals in New York City.

In March 2019, New York Mayor Eric Adams honored Rachel Freier and Ezras Nashim members with a citation for Women's History Month at Brooklyn Borough Hall.

In June 2023, New York Assemblyman Brian Cunningham honored Rachel Freier and Ezras Nashim members with the “2023 Women of Distinction Award”.

In February 2024, Ezras Nashim was approved a license to operate as an Advanced Life Support (ALS) Volunteer Ambulance Service. This allows them to train their EMT members as paramedics.

In September 2024, Ezras Nashim has expanded its fleet with a second ambulance, purchased for $220,000. This will allow them to navigate heavy traffic more easily and improve response times in the Jewish neighborhoods.

In May 2025, Ezras Nashim has expanded its services by adding new branches in Crown Heights and Flatbush, where the new ambulance is providing emergency services.

Several items from Ezras Nashim, among them a two-way radio and a modesty dress, were acquired by the National Museum of American History in 2026.

== Media ==
Ezras Nashim was the subject of the 2018 documentary film 93Queen. The film follows Rachel Freier, as she runs for public office and creates the first all-female ambulance corps in the United States, negotiating her community initiative within the context of a male-dominated Hasidic community.

The director of the 93Queen documentary is Paula Eislet who first encountered the Ezras Nashim organization through Yiddish language news reports.
