= New York's 42nd State Assembly district =

American legislative district

Assemblymember
Rodneyse Bichotte Hermelyn; D–Flatbush

New York's 42nd State Assembly district is one of the 150 districts in the New York State Assembly. It has been represented by Rodneyse Bichotte Hermelyn since 2015, succeeding Rhoda Jacobs.

== Geography ==
=== 2020s ===
District 42 includes portions of East Flatbush, Flatbush, Flatlands, Ditmas Park, Kensington and Midwood, in Brooklyn. The Prospect Park Parade Ground proper lies within the district.

The district overlaps (partially) with New York's 8th and 9th congressional districts, the 20th, 21st and 22nd districts of the New York State Senate, and the 40th and 45th districts of the New York City Council.

=== 2010s ===
The district includes portions of East Flatbush, Flatbush, Ditmas Park, and Midwood, in Brooklyn.

== Recent election results ==
=== 2026 ===
2026 New York State Assembly election, District 42
Party	Candidate	Votes	%
Democratic	Rodneyse Bichotte (incumbent)		
Republican	Herman Hall		
Write-in			
Total votes			100.0

=== 2024 ===
2024 New York State Assembly election, District 42
Party	Candidate	Votes	%
Democratic	Rodneyse Bichotte (incumbent)	34,509	98.7
Write-in		471	1.3
Total votes		34,980	100.0
Democratic hold			

=== 2022 ===
2022 New York State Assembly election, District 42
Party	Candidate	Votes	%
Democratic	Rodneyse Bichotte (incumbent)	22,255	98.6
Write-in		326	1.4
Total votes		22,581	100.0
Democratic hold			

=== 2020 ===
2020 New York State Assembly election, District 42
Party	Candidate	Votes	%
Democratic	Rodneyse Bichotte (incumbent)	39,649	99.4
Write-in		235	0.6
Total votes		39,884	100
Democratic hold			

=== 2018 ===
2018 New York State Assembly election, District 42
Primary election
Party	Candidate	Votes	%
Democratic	Rodneyse Bichotte (incumbent)	10,821	71.6
Democratic	Victor Jordan	4,233	28.0
Write-in		65	0.4
Total votes		15,119	100.0
General election
Democratic	Rodneyse Bichotte	26,773	
Working Families	Rodneyse Bichotte	1,839	
Total	Rodneyse Bichotte (incumbent)	28,612	90.6
Republican	Matthew Williams	1,985	
Conservative	Matthew Williams	279	
Total	Matthew Williams	2,264	7.2
Green	Anthony Beckford	689	2.2
Write-in		22	0.0
Total votes		31,587	100.0
Democratic hold			

=== 2016 ===
2016 New York State Assembly election, District 42
Primary election
Party	Candidate	Votes	%
Democratic	Rodneyse Bichotte (incumbent)	2,471	78.6
Democratic	Victor Jordan	666	21.2
Write-in		8	0.2
Total votes		3,145	100.0
General election
Democratic	Rodneyse Bichotte (incumbent)	34,379	90.5
Republican	Matthew Williams	2,857	
Conservative	Matthew Williams	705	
Total	Matthew Williams	3,562	9.4
Write-in		44	0.1
Total votes		37,985	100.0
Democratic hold			

=== 2014 ===
2014 New York State Assembly election, District 42
Primary election
Party	Candidate	Votes	%
Democratic	Rodneyse Bichotte	2,471	48.8
Democratic	L. Rickie Tulloch	1,696	30.0
Democratic	Michele Adolphe	843	14.9
Democratic	Victor Jordan	340	6.0
Write-in		12	0.3
Total votes		5,649	100.0
General election
Democratic	Rodneyse Bichotte	11,342	
Working Families	Rodneyse Bichotte	1,374	
Total	Rodneyse Bichotte	12,716	90.1
Republican	Matthew Williams	837	5.9
Conservative	Brian Kelly	536	3.8
Write-in		20	0.2
Total votes		14,109	100.0
Democratic hold			

=== 2012 ===
2012 New York State Assembly election, District 42
Primary election
Party	Candidate	Votes	%
Democratic	Rhoda Jacobs (incumbent)	3,923	67.5
Democratic	Rodneyse Bichotte	1,882	32.4
Write-in		5	0.9
Total votes		5,810	100.0
General election
Democratic	Rhoda Jacobs	30,649	
Working Families	Rhoda Jacobs	1,242	
Total	Rhoda Jacobs (incumbent)	31,891	99.8
Write-in		61	0.2
Total votes		31,952	100.0
Democratic hold			

=== 2010 ===
2010 New York State Assembly election, District 42
Primary election
Party	Candidate	Votes	%
Democratic	Rhoda Jacobs (incumbent)	3,605	68.4
Democratic	Michele Adolphe	1,659	31.5
Write-in		6	0.1
Total votes		5,270	100.0
General election
Democratic	Rhoda Jacobs (incumbent)	15,363	92.4
Republican	Alan Kesler	1,260	7.6
Write-in		8	0.0
Total votes		16,631	100.0
Democratic hold			

=== 2008 ===
2008 New York State Assembly election, District 42
Primary election
Party	Candidate	Votes	%
Democratic	Rhoda Jacobs (incumbent)	3,982	70.8
Democratic	Michele Adolphe	1,644	29.2
Write-in		0	0.0
Total votes		5,626	100.0
General election
Democratic	Rhoda Jacobs (incumbent)	25,108	93.9
Republican	Alan Kesler	1,643	6.1
Write-in		2	0.0
Total votes		26,753	100.0
Democratic hold			

=== 2006 ===
2006 New York State Assembly election, District 42
Party	Candidate	Votes	%
Democratic	Rhoda Jacobs (incumbent)	11,073	94.1
Republican	Harriet Katz	697	5.9
Write-in		1	0.0
Total votes		11,771	100.0
Democratic hold			

=== 2004 ===
2004 New York State Assembly election, District 42
Primary election
Party	Candidate	Votes	%
Democratic	Rhoda Jacobs (incumbent)	3,575	61.7
Democratic	Zacary Lareche	1,155	19.9
Democratic	Michele Adolphe	1,060	18.3
Write-in		0	0.0
Total votes		5,790	100.0
General election
Democratic	Rhoda Jacobs (incumbent)	21,798	93.1
Republican	Harriet Katz	1,606	6.9
Write-in		0	0.0
Total votes		23,404	100.0
Democratic hold			

=== 2002 ===
2002 New York State Assembly election, District 42
Party	Candidate	Votes	%
Democratic	Rhoda Jacobs	10,605	
Liberal	Rhoda Jacobs	207	
Total	Rhoda Jacobs (incumbent)	10,812	100.0
Write-in		4	0.0
Total votes		10,816	100.0
Democratic hold			

=== 2000 ===
2000 New York State Assembly election, District 42
Party	Candidate	Votes	%
Democratic	Rhoda Jacobs (incumbent)	17,418	82.0
Independence	Zacary Lareche	3,207	15.1
Republican	Bernard Sampson	617	2.9
Write-in		0	0.0
Total votes		21,242	100.0
Democratic hold			

=== Federal results in Assembly District 42 ===
Year	Office	Results
2024	President	Harris 81.2 - 16.9%
2024	Senate	Gillibrand 84.4 - 14.5%
2022	Senate	Schumer 85.4 - 14.0%
2020	President	Biden 85.6 - 13.6%
2018	Senate	Gillibrand 91.6 - 8.3%
2016	President	Clinton 86.8 - 10.6%
2016	Senate	Schumer 91.4 - 5.7%
2012	President	Obama 88.3 - 11.1%
2012	Senate	Gillibrand 92.5 - 6.7%
