= Karim Camara =

American politician

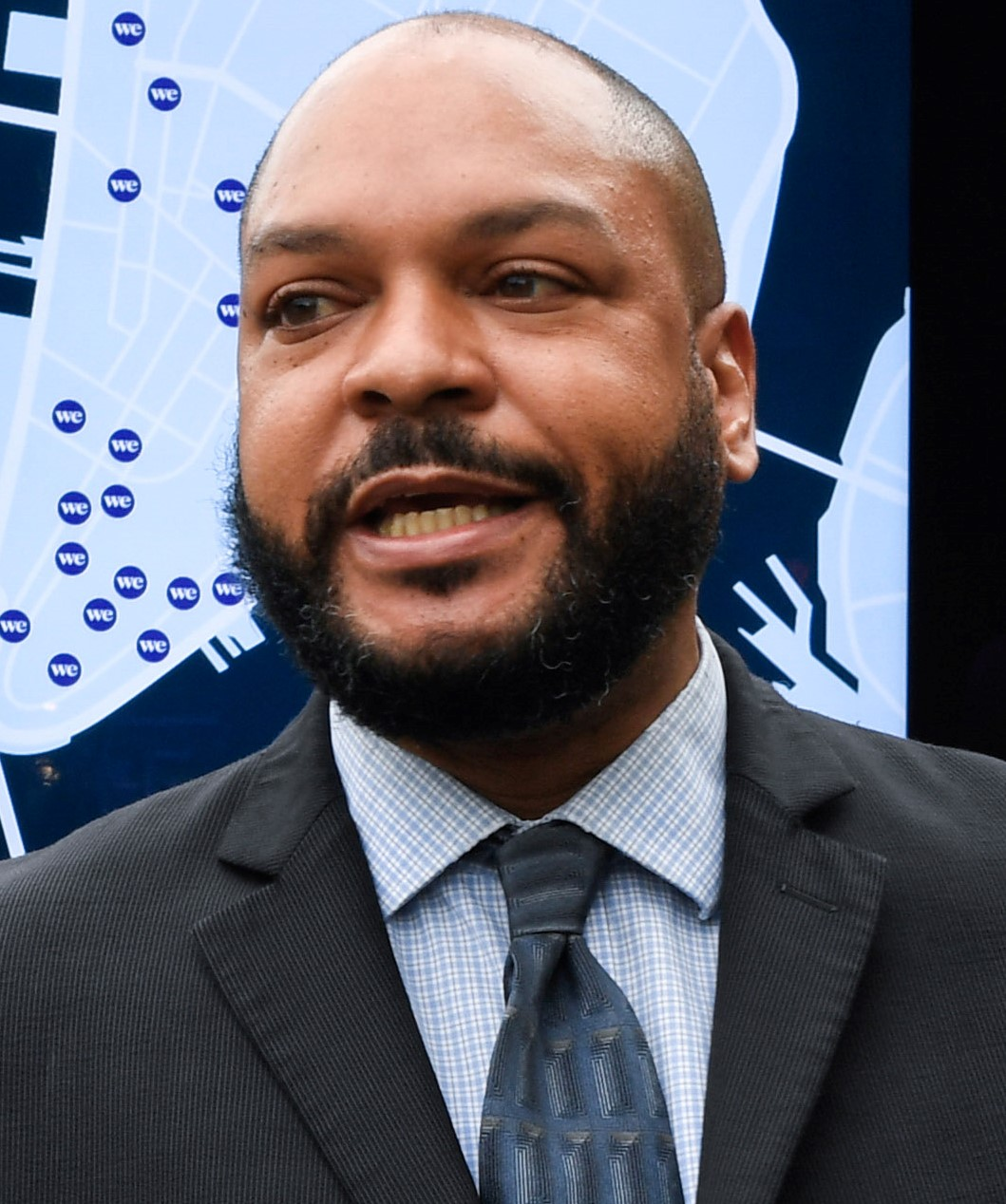

Executive Director of the Governor’s Office of Faith Based Community Development Services
- In office February 2015 – June 2022
- Preceded by: position established
- Succeeded by: Office abolished

Member of the New York State Assembly from the 43rd district
- In office November 2005 – February 2015
- Preceded by: Clarence Norman Jr.
- Succeeded by: Diana Richardson

Personal details
- Born: Karim Abdur-Razzaq; June 3, 1971 (age 55) Crown Heights, Brooklyn
- Party: Democratic
- Spouse: Orelia Merchant
- Children: 2
- Education: Xavier University of Louisiana; New York Theological Seminary
- Profession: Politician
- Website: Official website

Karim Camara (born June 3, 1971) is an American pastor and former Democratic member of the New York State Assembly, where he represented the 43rd Assembly District which includes parts of the Brooklyn neighborhoods of Crown Heights, Lefferts Gardens and East Flatbush. He is the founding and senior pastor of the Abundant Life Church in Brooklyn and was previously the executive pastor of First Baptist Church of Crown Heights. He was also the New York State Faith Director for the then-U.S. Senator Barack Obama's 2008 presidential campaign.

He was first elected to the State Assembly in a November 2005 special election to replace Clarence Norman Jr. In February 2015, he vacated his seat to become executive director of the Office of Faith-Based Community Development.

== Early life and education ==
A native of Brooklyn, Camara (born Karim Abdur-Razzaq) spent most of his childhood in Crown Heights, Brooklyn which is in the Assembly District he now represents. He also spent formative years both in Queens and on a farm in Westtown, New York (Orange County).

He graduated from Brooklyn Friends School in 1988. He went on to attain his B.A. in English Literature and Chemistry from Xavier University of Louisiana and a Masters of Divinity from the New York Theological Seminary.

== Early career and personal life ==
He was the fundraising director for the Cush Campus Schools in Brooklyn, of which his mother is a founder and the principal.

Camara resides in Brooklyn with his wife, Orelia Merchant, a federal district court judge, and their two children.

== Election results ==
- November 2005 special election, NYS Assembly, 43rd AD

Karim Camara (DEM)	...	8,411
Geoffrey A. Davis (IND)	...	1,818
Kenneth E. Cook (REP - CON)	...	1,093

- November 2006 general election, NYS Assembly, 43rd AD

Karim Camara (DEM - WOR)	...	11,873
Kenneth E. Cook (REP - CON)	...	983

- November 2008 general election, NYS Assembly, 43rd AD

Karim Camara (DEM - WOR)	...	26,769
Stuart Balberg (REP - CON)	...	2,096

- November 2010 general election, NYS Assembly, 43rd AD

Karim Camara (DEM - WOR)	...	17,923
Menachem M. Raitport (REP - CON)	...	1,538

Political offices
Preceded by Clarence Norman Jr.	New York Assembly, 43rd District; 2005–2015	Succeeded by Diana Richardson
