= Rachel Freier =

American judge and community activist

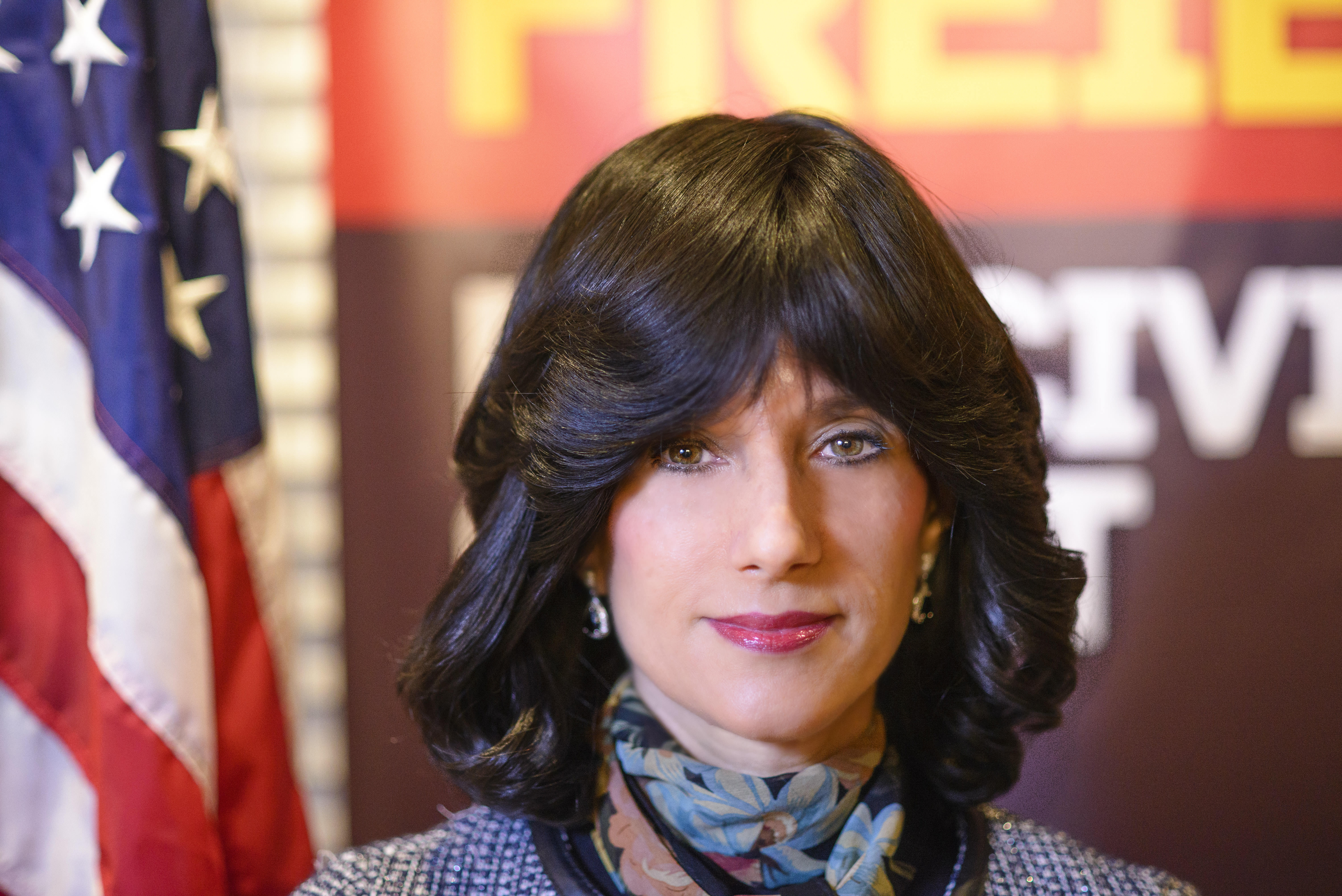

New York Supreme Court Judge
- Incumbent
- Assumed office January 3, 2023

Justice of New York City Criminal Court
- In office December 22, 2016 – January 3, 2023

Personal details
- Born: April 2, 1965 (age 61) Brooklyn, New York, U.S.
- Party: Democratic
- Spouse: David Freier
- Children: 6
- Education: Bais Yaakov, Touro College; Brooklyn Law School
- Known for: First Hasidic woman judge

Rachel "Ruchie" Freier (born April 2, 1965) is a New York Supreme Court justice.

In 2016, she campaigned and was elected as a Civil Court judge for the Kings County 5th judicial district in New York State, thereby becoming the first Hasidic Jewish woman to be elected as a civil court judge in New York State, and the first Hasidic woman to hold public office in United States history. Although she ran for the Civil Court, after her election, she was assigned to serve on the Criminal Court in the Kings County 5th judicial district.

In January 2023 she was appointed to fill a vacancy on the New York Supreme Court, and in November 2023 she was elected to the position in her own right. She previously worked as a real estate attorney and community activist, and served as a volunteer court lawyer in the New York City Family Court.

== Early life and education ==
Freier was born in Borough Park, Brooklyn, the eldest of five children in a Hasidic Jewish family. While attending the Bais Yaakov high school in Borough Park, she took a course in legal stenography, and she graduated from high school in 1982. At age 19 she married David Freier, with whom she has three sons and three daughters.

Freier worked first as a legal secretary, and, in 1994, as a paralegal at law firm Willkie Farr & Gallagher, in order to support her husband in kollel. Her husband went on to complete an accounting degree at Touro College, and in 1996, she also decided to pursue a college education. She began studying law at age 30 after realizing she was working for lawyers younger than her.

She enrolled at Lander College, part of the Touro College and University System, where she became director of the women's pre-law society, and graduated six years later with a bachelor of science degree in political science.

She then entered Brooklyn Law School, completing her degree in four years, graduating in June 2005.

== Career ==
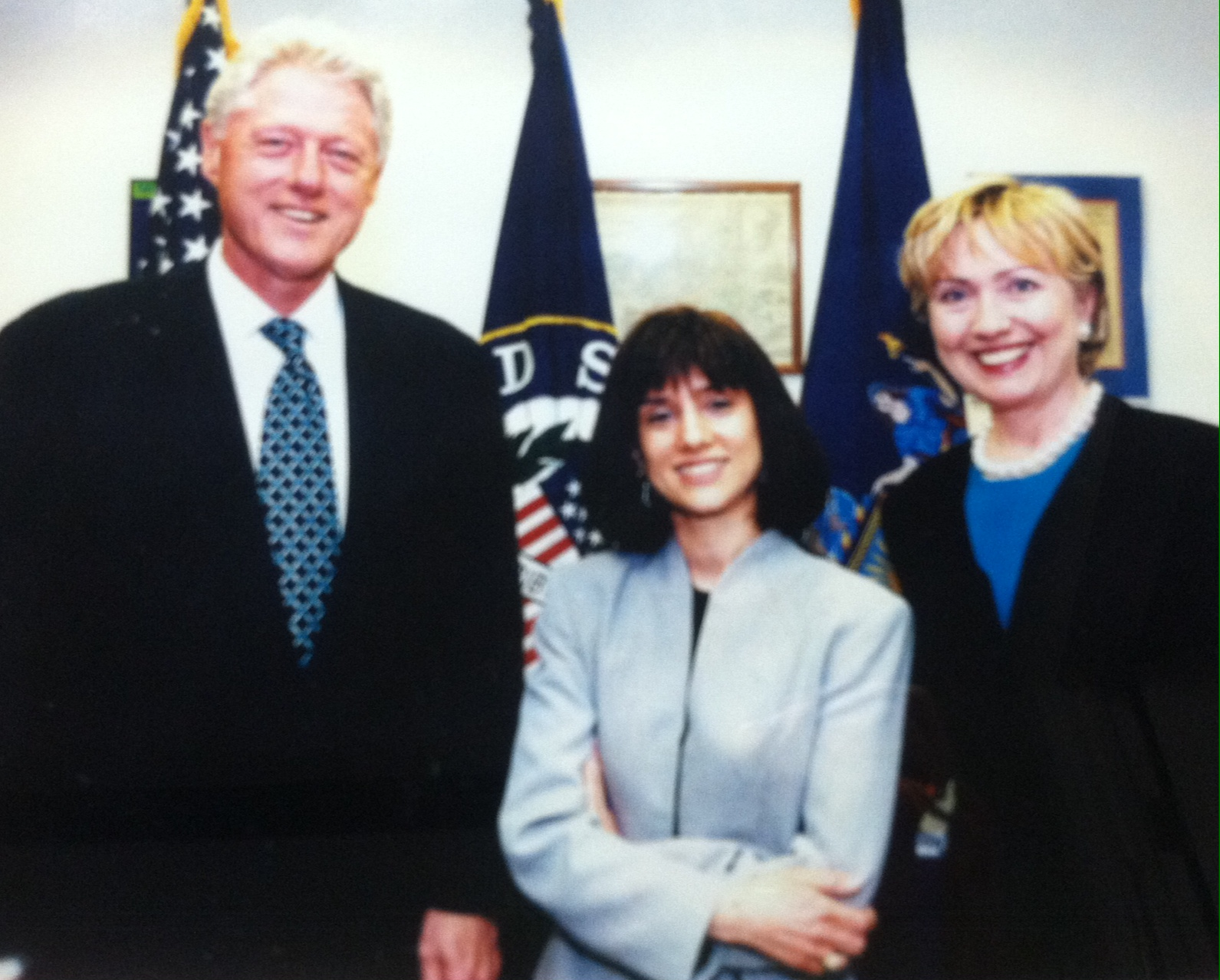
Rachel Freier meeting with President Bill Clinton & Hillary Clinton

Freier passed the New York State Bar exam in 2006. She is also licensed to practice law in New Jersey and the District of Columbia.

Freier and her husband shared an office in Borough Park, where she practiced commercial and residential estate law, and he did commercial financing.

Freier also had a law office in Monroe, New York, where she did business with Hasidic residents of nearby Kiryas Joel. She advocated for the Satmar Hasidic Community by speaking to residents of Orange, Sullivan, and Rockland counties, to help correct misconceptions people might have about Hasidic life in Kiryas Joel, and to better understand the Hasidic neighbors in their midst.

Freier began her political career in 2001 as an intern in the Manhattan office of then-U.S. Senator from New York Hillary Clinton. She also interned for other elected officials.

== Civil court judge ==
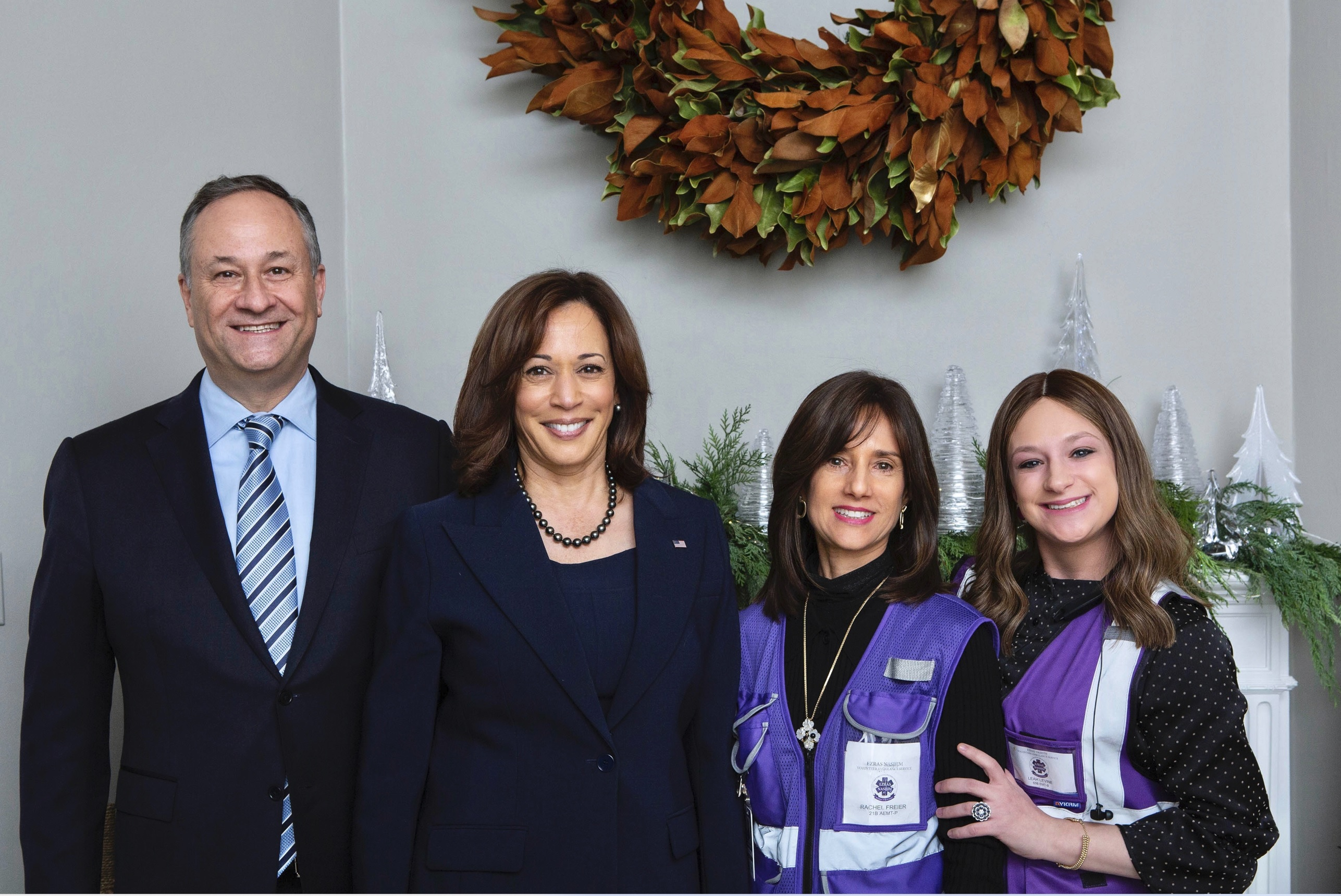
US Vice President Kamala Harris with Rachel Freier at the Hanukkah reception in the VP Official Residence

In April 2016, Freier announced her candidacy for civil court judge, running for the spot on the bench vacated by Judge Noach Dear.

In the September 2016 Democratic primary election for Civil Court Judge of the Kings County 5th judicial district, Freier garnered 4,730 votes (40.9 percent), followed by Jill Epstein with 3,993 votes (34.5 percent), and Morton Avigdor with 2,835 votes (24.5 percent). She entered the November general election, with Avigdor as a Conservative Party challenger, and received 68,088 votes (74.4 percent), to his 23,393 votes (25.6 percent).

Freier was endorsed in the three-way race during the elections by The Jewish Press and the New York Daily News.

On December 22, 2016, she was sworn-in at Brooklyn Borough Hall. She delivered a speech that included Hebrew and Yiddish phrases and concepts which she translated into English. Her inauguration ceremony was carried live on WABC-TV and News 12.

On hand for her swearing-in was Hasidic singer Lipa Schmeltzer, who sang "The Star-Spangled Banner" with bits of Yiddish and "God Bless America" in full Yiddish version.

Subsequent to her swearing-in, Freier was assigned to serve on the New York City Criminal Court.

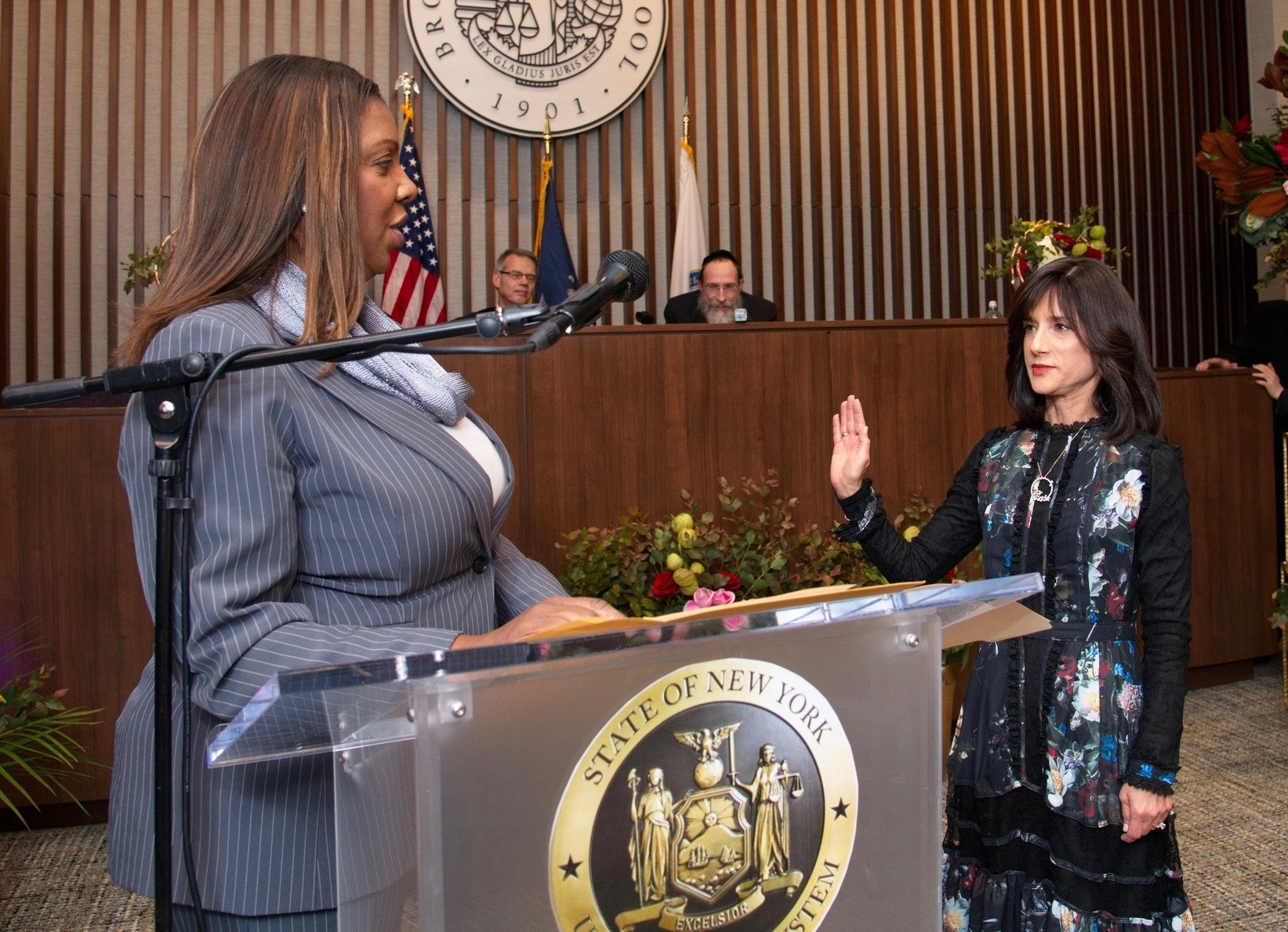
NY Attorney General Letitia James swearing-in Rachel Freier as Supreme Court Justice of NY, at her inauguration in Brooklyn Law School

In December 2017, Megyn Kelly welcomed Freier to the Today Show as the woman The New York Times has called “the Hasidic superwoman of night court”; she was featured in the series “She’s Got Faith,” marking her one-year anniversary on the bench.

In July 2022, Freier announced her candidacy for Supreme Court Judge, running for one of the 10 vacancies on Brooklyn's Supreme Court.

In January 2023, Freier was appointed as acting New York Supreme Court justice by her supervisors to fill a vacancy on the Supreme Court, Religious leaders say she is the first Hasidic woman to hold this role.

In August 2023, Freier was nominated as a Supreme Court Justice candidate for a 14-year term, the vote was conducted by Brooklyn District Leaders at the Judicial Convention. On November 7, 2023, she was elected to the court in her own right in the general election.

On November 15, 2023, Freier was sworn-in by New York Attorney General Letitia James as Supreme Court Justice of NY. Her inauguration ceremony was held at Brooklyn Law School, and it was carried live on TV News 12.

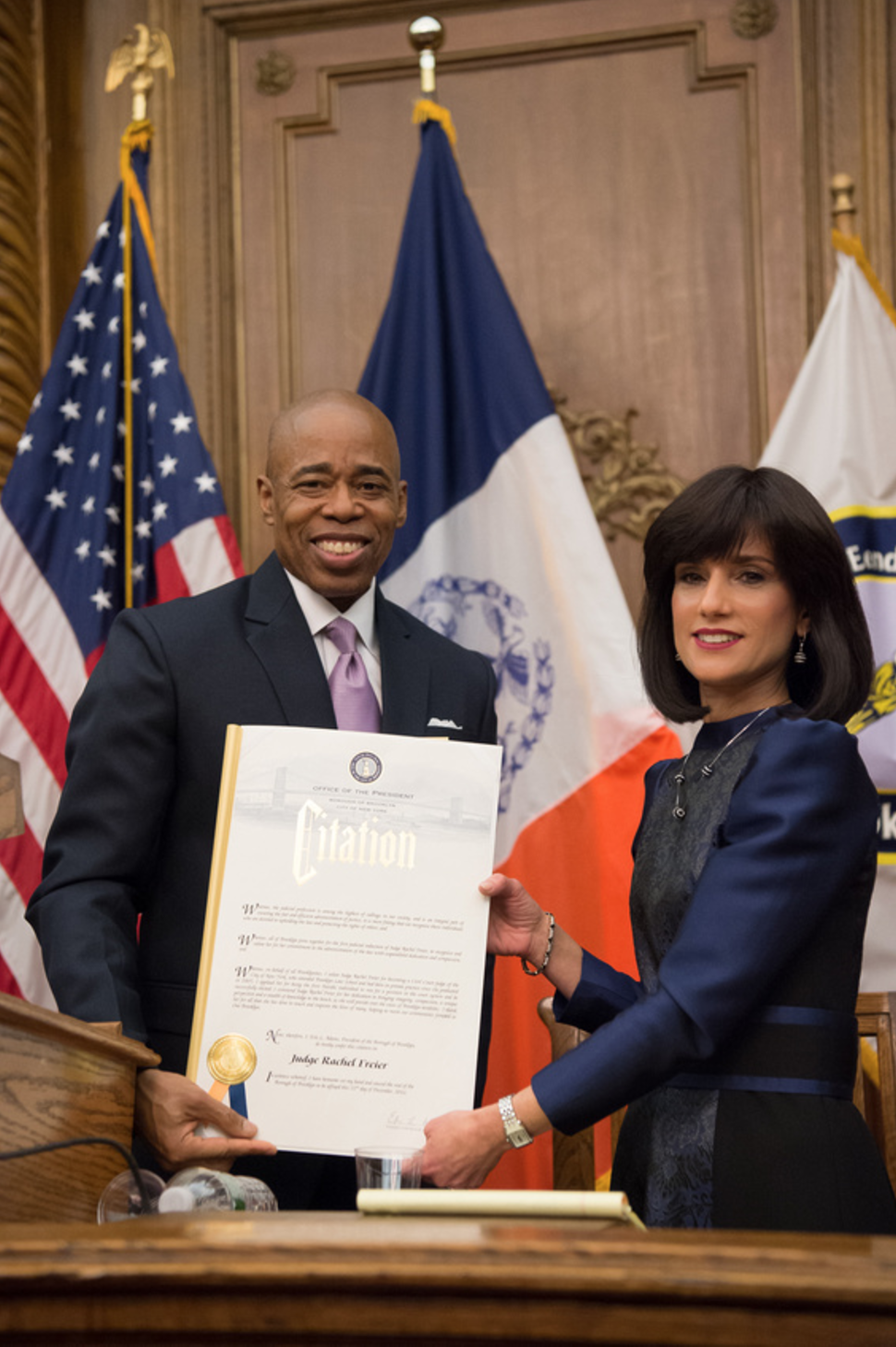
NYC Mayor Eric Adams giving Rachel Freier an award at her inauguration in Brooklyn Borough Hall

Election history
Location	Date	Party	Votes	Results
Brooklyn Civil Court District 5	Sept; 2016	Democratic	4,730; 3,993; 2,835	√ Rachel Freier 40.9% Jill Epstein 34.5% Morton Avigdor 24.5%
Brooklyn Civil Court District 5	Dec; 2016	General	68,088; 23,393	√ Rachel Freier (D) 74.4% Morton Avigdor (R) 25.6%
New York Supreme Court District 2	Nov 7 2023	General	138,498; 135,789; 134,410; 131,223; 128,437; 105,852; 33,377	√ Sharon Clarke (D) 17.1% √ Rachel Freier (D) 16.8% √ Joanne Quinones (D) 16.6% √ Saul Stein (D) 16.3% √ Heela Capell (D) 15.9% √ Caroline Piela Cohen (D) 13.1% Timothy Peterson (R) 4.1%

== Volunteer activities ==
In 2005, Freier established Chasdei Devorah, Inc., a non-profit charity organization to help poor Jewish families, in memory of a young friend.

In 2008, Freier was one of the founders of B'Derech, a GED program for Haredi youth at-risk. The organization also helps troubled teens with therapy and hypnosis.

The program launched in partnership with the New York branch of Bramson ORT College adding a Men's Division and Women’s Division.

In 2010, Freier advocated to save Breslov Yeshiva in Williamsburg, in spite of opposition from some who harassed the students and maligned the Rabbi, Yoel Roth. Freier received threats for defending the yeshiva, but she won the court case.

In 2011, she founded Ezras Nashim, an all-female Orthodox Jewish volunteer EMT ambulance service established with the goal of preserving women's modesty in emergency medical situations, especially childbirth.

== Affiliations ==
Freier is a licensed EMT, and has completed advanced training to qualify as a New York State paramedic. She has served on Borough Park's Community Board 12, and performed pro bono legal services for the New York City Family Court.

Freier appeared in a documentary about Ezras Nashim, entitled 93Queen, which was directed by filmmaker Paula Eiselt. The film premiered on May 1, 2018, at the Hot Docs Canadian International Documentary Festival. The film aired on PBS's POV, marking its television debut, on September 17, 2018.

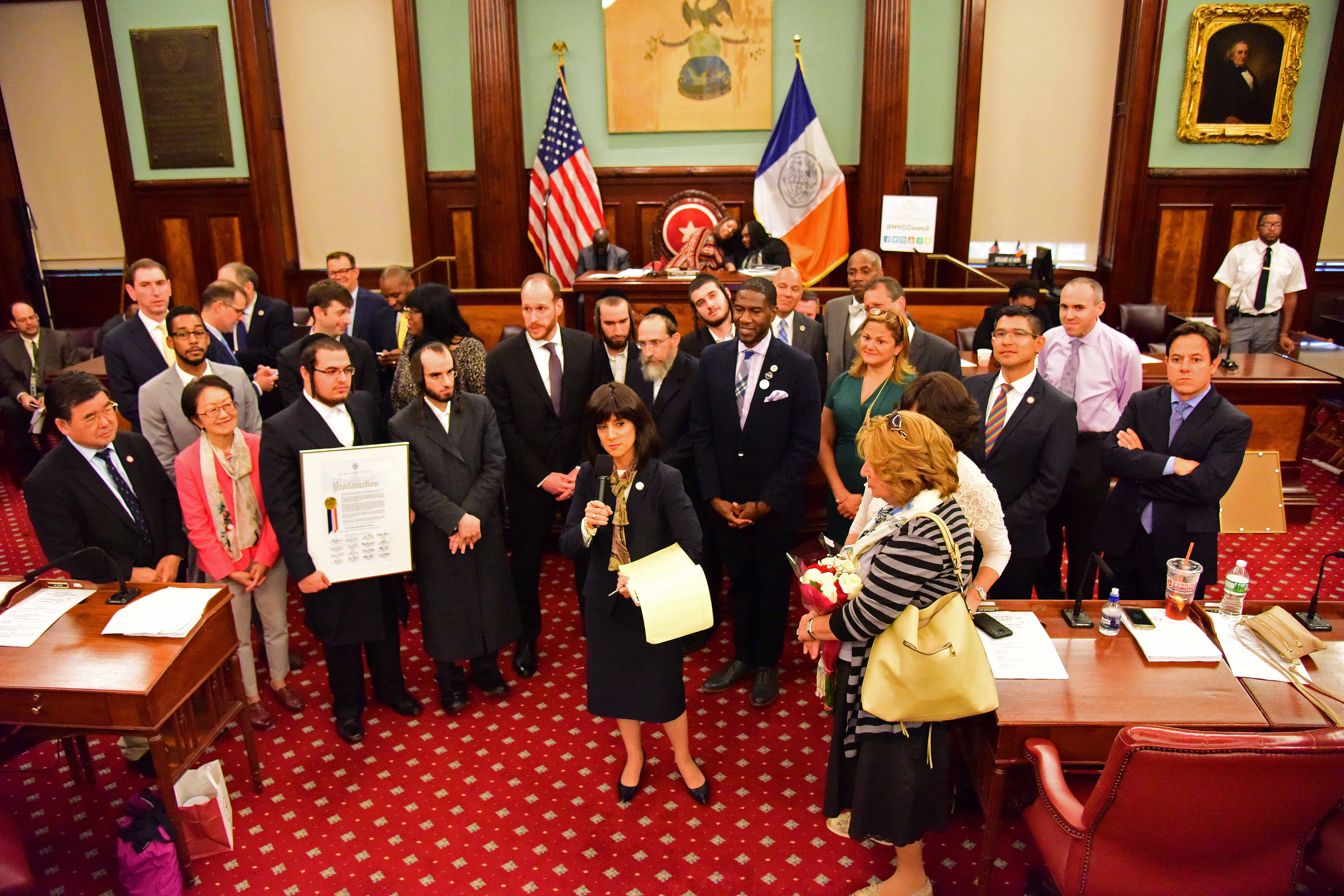
Freier honored at the New York City Council Chambers with a Proclamation Award for being elected as the first Hasidic woman to public office in New York City, September 7, 2017

== Honors and awards ==
In September 2017, Freier was honored at the New York City Hall in the Council Chambers with a "Proclamation Award" presented by the Speaker & Council-members of the Jewish Caucus for her achievement of becoming the First Hasidic Woman elected to Public Office in New York City.

In 2017, Freier was chosen by The Jerusalem Post, an Israeli newspaper, as #40 of the "50 Most Influential Jews" in the world. In 2016, she was named one of the "15 Most Influential Jews" in the world by Makor Rishon, another Israeli newspaper.

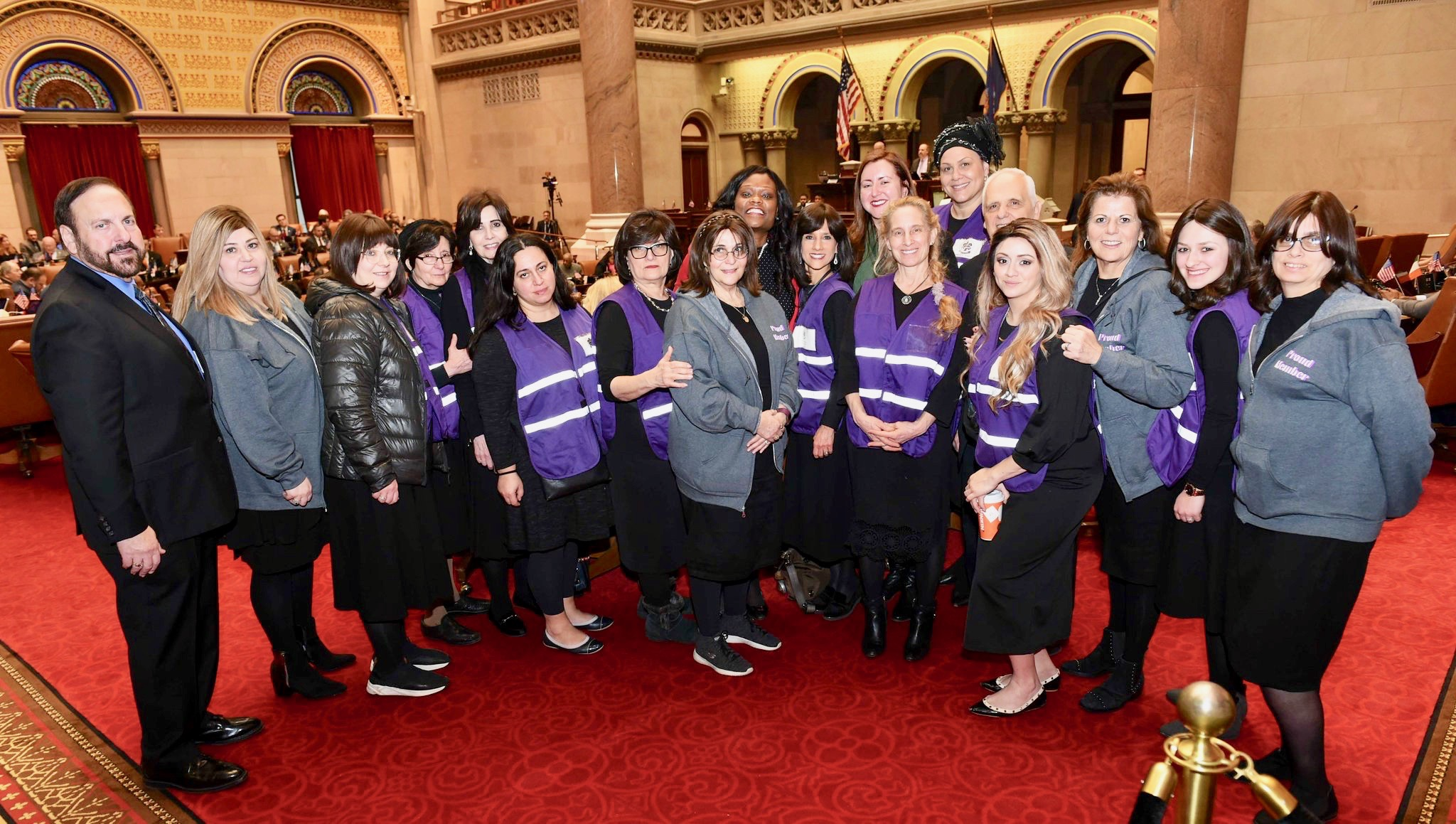
Freier with a delegation of Ezras Nashim members were recognized in the New York State Capitol in Albany

Also in 2016, Freier's judgeship was selected by Kings County Politics as one of the "Top 10 Stories" among political events in New York City that year. She was also listed by City & State magazine as one of the "Winners" among politicians of New York State that year, and was a recipient of Jew in the City's "Orthodox Jewish All Stars Award".

In September 2018, Freier was named by the Algemeiner Journal among the "J100" list of "top 100 people" positively influencing Jewish life. In December 2018, Freier was named in The "Forward 50" list of American Jews who have a profound impact on the American Jewish community. In October 2018, Freier was inducted into the Brooklyn Jewish Hall of Fame; she received an award recognized among the leading Brooklynites.

In May 2019, Freier was awarded by Lufthansa Airlines for saving the life of a passenger who had a medical emergency onboard, when she was able to provide medical care in mid-flight.

In January 2020, Freier along with a delegation of Ezras Nashim members were recognized in front of the entire New York State Assembly in the Assembly Chambers of the New York State Capitol Building in Albany, a resolution was passed recognizing the EMT members for their volunteer efforts of preserving women’s dignity during emergencies, Freier and the delegation had afterwards a private meeting with New York Governor Kathy Hochul in the Capitol Building.

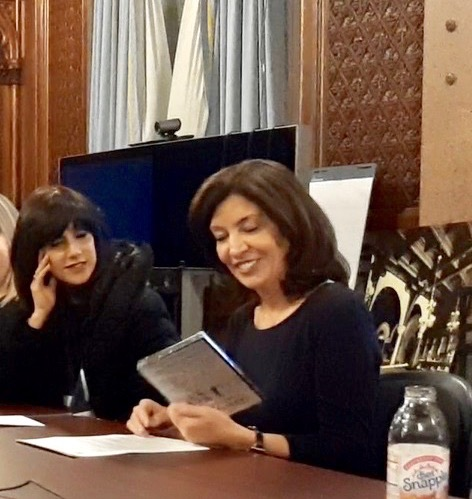
Rachel Freier meets with New York Governor Kathy Hochul in Albany

== Personal life ==
She married David Freier, a Bobover Hasid, with whom she has three sons and three daughters. They reside in the Borough Park Hasidic community of Brooklyn. Freier credits support from family and her husband for success. Freier spends her personal time inspiring Jewish women in Judaism by speaking at Jewish schools, Jewish organizations i.e. OU Kosher Headquarters and Jewish Federations. Freier also speaks at Chabad Centers all over the world, inspiring Jewish woman bringing them closer to Judaism known as the "Kiruv Movement".

== See also ==
- List of first women lawyers and judges in New York
- List of first women lawyers and judges in the United States
- Ezras Nashim
