= Harry Smoler =

American politician

Member of the New York State Assembly from the 42nd district
- In office January 1, 1979 – December 31, 1982
- Preceded by: David P. Greenberg
- Succeeded by: Rhoda S. Jacobs

Personal details
- Born: November 8, 1911 Brooklyn, New York City, New York
- Died: June 12, 1991 (aged 79) Brooklyn, New York City, New York
- Party: Democratic

Harry Smoler (November 8, 1911 – June 12, 1991) was an American politician who served in the New York State Assembly from the 42nd district from 1979 to 1982.

He died of heart disease on June 12, 1991, in Brooklyn, New York City, New York at age 79.
