= Brian A. Cunningham =

American politician

Brian Cunningham
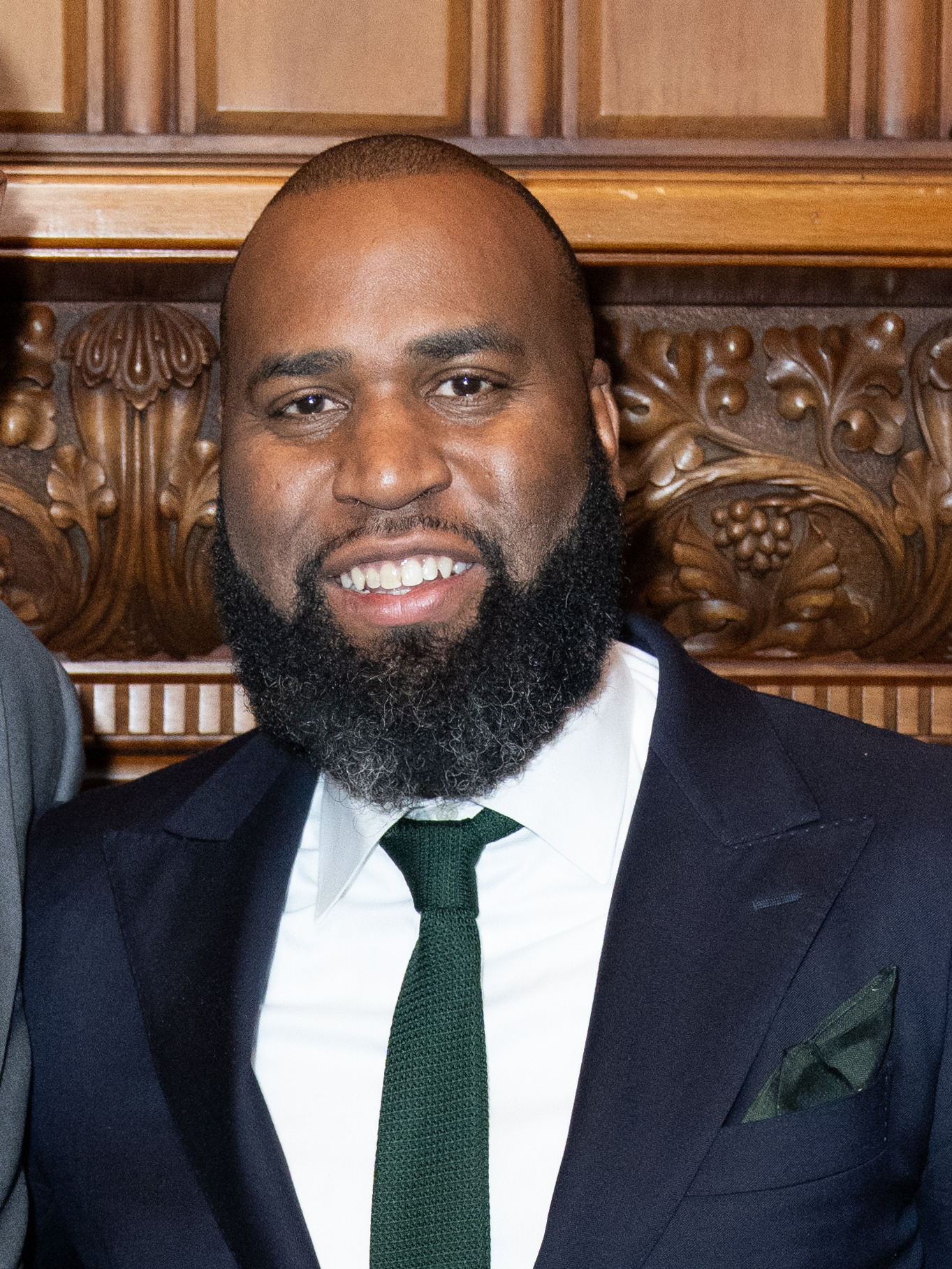
- Cunningham in 2025

Member of the New York State Assembly from the 43rd district
- Incumbent
- Assumed office March 30, 2022
- Preceded by: Diana Richardson

Personal details
- Born: Brian-Christopher Cunningham; December 16, 1984 (age 41) New York City, New York, U.S.
- Party: Democratic
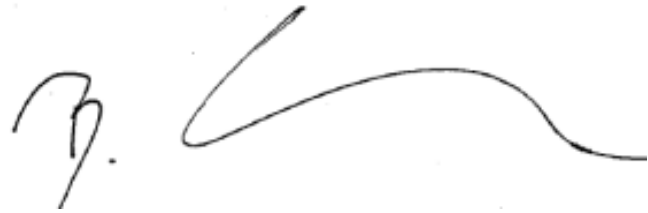
- Signature
- Website: State Assembly website

Brian-Christopher A. Cunningham (born December 16, 1984) is an American politician serving as a member of the New York State Assembly from the 43rd Assembly District, which includes parts of Flatbush, East Flatbush, Prospect Lefferts Gardens, and Crown Heights in Brooklyn, New York City. A Democrat, Cunningham was first elected to the Assembly in 2022 following a special election.

== Early life and education ==
Born in New York City, Cunningham was raised in the Flatbush neighborhood of Brooklyn. The son of immigrants from Jamaica, Cunningham attended public schools growing up. Cunningham lives in Brooklyn with his wife, Stephanie Cunningham, the executive director of Museum Hue. They have one son.

== Career ==
Prior to his election to the Assembly, Cunningham worked in government, nonprofit, and educational sectors that focused on youth development and community engagement. He also served as a senior aide in city, state and federal government, concentrating on constituent services, housing, and education policy.

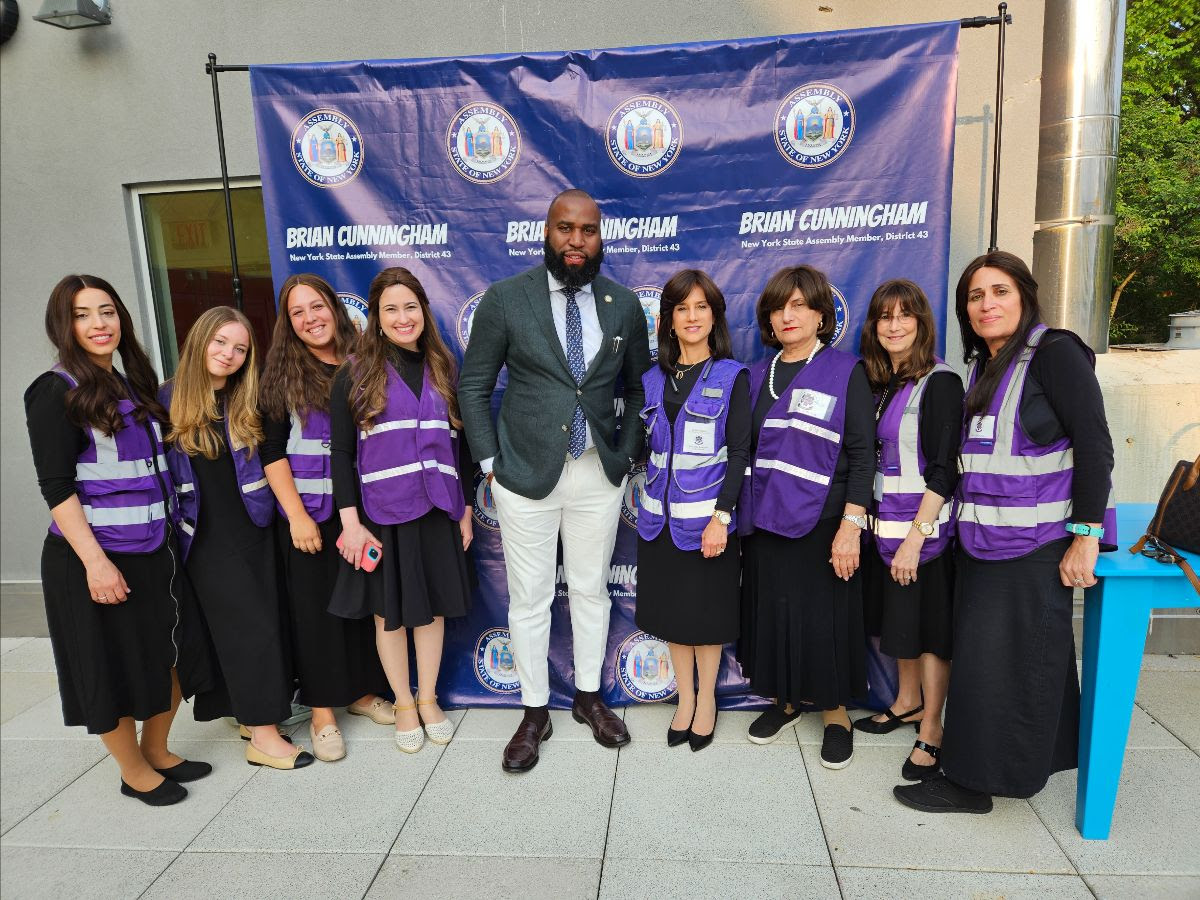
Assemblyman Brian Cunningham honors Ezras Nashim with the “2023 Women of Distinction Award”

Cunningham first sought election in 2017 for the 40th district of the New York City Council. He received second place in the Democratic primary, losing to then-incumbent Mathieu Eugene, before contesting the general election as a third party candidate. He ran as nominee of the Reform Party with the endorsement of the Working Families Party. However, he placed second again to the then-incumbent.

Cunningham was elected to the New York State Assembly in March 2022, succeeding Diana Richardson in a special election. Since taking office, he has championed policies focused on education equity, affordable housing, workforce development, and public safety reform.

In 2022, Cunningham endorsed Yuh-Line Niou for the 2022 election in the 10th congressional district. However, he later rescinded his endorsement following Niou's declaration of support for the Boycott, Divestment and Sanctions (BDS) movement.

In June 2023, Cunningham honored Ezras Nashim with the “2023 Women of Distinction Award” for achieving the first all-female volunteer EMT team.
