= Gerald Garson =

American judge and convict

Justice Gerald Phillip "Gerry" Garson

New York Supreme Court Justice
- In office 1998–2003

Personal details
- Born: August 3, 1932
- Died: February 6, 2016 (age 83)
- Party: Democratic Party
- Spouse(s): Judge Robin Garson, New York State Supreme Court, Kings County
- Relations: Justice Michael J. Garson, New York State Supreme Court (cousin)
- Children: Four
- Education: University of Pennsylvania; University of Pennsylvania Law School (J.D.)
- Profession: Former attorney and judge

Military service
- Branch/service: U.S. Air Force
- Known for: convicted of accepting bribes to manipulate the outcome of divorce proceedings

Gerald Phillip Garson (August 3, 1932 — February 6, 2016) was an American lawyer and New York Supreme Court Justice who heard matrimonial divorce and child custody cases in Brooklyn. He was convicted in 2007 of accepting bribes to manipulate the outcomes of divorce proceedings. Garson was imprisoned from June 2007 until December 2009.

In the bribery scheme, a "fixer" told people divorcing in Brooklyn that for a price he could steer their case to a sympathetic judge. After the fixer received a payment, he would refer the person to a lawyer contact of his, who had given Garson drinks, meals, cigars, and cash—accepting (and receiving) preferential treatment in return. The fixer and the lawyer, Paul Siminovsky (a lawyer for children appointed by Garson), would then bribe court employees to override the court's computer system, which was programmed to ensure that cases were assigned to judges randomly. Instead, they would have the case assigned to Garson. Garson, in turn, would then privately coach the lawyer. He would tell him questions the lawyer should ask of witnesses in the case before Garson, and arguments that the lawyer should make to Garson in court. Garson would then rule in favor of the lawyer.

Garson was indicted in 2003, on the basis of video surveillance of his judicial chambers, and recordings made on a body wire worn by his "favored" lawyer. At his four-week trial in 2007, he was acquitted on four counts, but found guilty on one count of accepting bribes, and on two lesser charges of receiving rewards for official misconduct. He was sentenced in June 2007 to three to ten years in prison. In December 2009, after 30 months in prison, he was released for good behavior at the age of 77.

The New York Times, commenting on Garson's conviction, observed: "It was news that confirmed every sneaking suspicion, every paranoid fantasy of anyone who had ever felt wronged in a divorce court."

== Early career ==
Garson graduated from the University of Pennsylvania in 1954 and from the University of Pennsylvania Law School in 1957. He was a U.S. Air Force veteran.

In 1962 he founded the law firm Gerber & Garson, on Court Street in Brooklyn, with Howard Gerber. The politically connected law firm is now known as Gerber & Gerber. In the 1970s and 1980s, Garson and his law firm had a lucrative practice representing owners of taxi fleets, defending taxi drivers and owners in negligence suits.

In 1984, Garson was censured by the state Appellate Division for "conferring gifts, gratuities and benefits", by giving an improper gift to a judge with whom he had a "long-standing social relationship". Garson and members of his firm regularly appeared before then-New York Civil Court Judge Frank Vaccaro. In 1972, Garson treated Judge Vaccaro and his wife to a weekend vacation at Kutsher's County Club in the Catskills, and falsely registered the judge under an assumed name; later, he lied about the incident to investigators. Vaccaro, by then a New York State Supreme Court Justice, was suspended without pay for six months.

Garson was also Treasurer from the late 1980s until the mid-1990s for a political action committee arm of the Brooklyn Democratic Party, the Brooklyn Democrats. He was appointed by his former law practice colleague, Brooklyn Borough President Howard Golden.

== Justice of the NY Supreme Court (1998–2003) ==
In 1997, Garson was placed on the ballot to be a Democratic Party nominee for the position of Justice of the New York Supreme Court, the highest state court below the appellate level, and the equivalent of county court. He was placed on the ballot by Clarence Norman Jr., a long-time Kings County Democratic Party leader. Garson then won the 1998 general election.

He became a justice of the State Supreme Court, with an annual salary of $136,700. His courtroom was in "Matrimonial Part 5B", in the Municipal Building on Joralemon Street in Brooklyn Heights. In five years as a Justice, Garson handled 1,100 matrimony cases. He made decisions on child custody, and divided families' financial assets.

In an anonymous survey of lawyers, he was described as "always well prepared", and as having "excellent settlement skills". In the 2004–05 edition of New York Judge Reviews and Court Directory, Garson received the following comments in anonymous reviews, under the section "Temperament/Demeanor":

Nearly every interviewee complimented Judge Garson's demeanor. 'He's pleasant, and will let you try your case. He's excellent—a real lawyer's judge.' 'He's easy to get along with.' 'He can be pleasant.' 'He's nice and very competent.' Only one lawyer criticized [him], saying, '[Judge Garson is] tough, and can be aggressive and impatient.'

Garson also received good ratings for his legal knowledge, administration of his courtroom, and handling of trials and settlements. He was rated "approved" by the local bar association. In 2001, he was applauded by feminists for ordering an Orthodox Jewish man to pay his ex-wife $500-a-week for life, because the man refused to grant her a religious divorce, or get.

== Indictment, arrest, and related events (2003–07) ==
=== Sting operation, indictment, and arrest ===
In October 2002, Frieda Hanimov, an Israeli émigré nurse, called a hotline at the District Attorney's (DA's) Office. The mother of three, was at the time embroiled in a bitter child-custody dispute that was being heard by Judge Garson. She complained that she had been told that her husband, Yuri Hanimov, had bribed the judge to fix their case, and that he had done so through Nissim Elmann (reputedly a "fixer", who arranged bribes in divorce and custody cases) and Paul Siminovsky (the divorce lawyer whom Garson had appointed as law guardian for her children). The woman had learned this when she herself met with Elmann, seeking to bribe Garson. Elmann told her that she was too late, inasmuch as her husband had already paid a large bribe to receive a favorable ruling. Within days, the DA's Office had her wearing a wire, meeting with and secretly taping Elmann.

Garson was subsequently indicted and arrested in April 2003 outside of his Upper East Side apartment. He was charged with having accepted cash and other gifts from Siminovsky, as payment for preferential treatment. The treatment included Judge Garson privately coaching Siminovsky as to what questions he should ask, and what arguments he should use. Garson would then rule in Siminovsky's favor. This violated the rules of judicial conduct, which prohibit a judge from speaking privately with an attorney who has a case pending, without the presence or permission of the opposing attorney.

Garson was suspended from the bench without pay on May 22, 2003, by the Court of Appeals of New York. He ultimately resigned and retired.

In 2006, he received, but rejected an offer to plead guilty to two minor felonies, in exchange for a 16-month sentence in a local jail. His trial was delayed as he sought treatment for cancer and underwent surgery, and while pre-trial rulings on the charges against him were litigated.

=== Prosecution of others charged in the scheme ===
Others charged with felonies linked to the Garson bribery scheme were: Siminovsky (who was ultimately sentenced to only one year in prison, as a result of his cooperation and a plea bargain), the "fixer" (sentenced to 16 months to 5½ years in prison), a court officer (sentenced to 1–4½ years in prison), two of Siminovsky's clients who paid what they understood were bribes (sentenced to three months in prison and 150 hours of community service, and to 210 hours of community service), and a former Garson court clerk (acquitted). Two long-time employees in the main court clerk's office, who were not arrested, were suspended without pay.

==== Lawyer ====
Siminovsky, a lawyer who appeared before Garson in divorce cases, was arrested on February 25, 2003. He had a friendship with Garson going back to 2001 and spent an extraordinary amount of time with him outside of court, taking him out and paying for lunches, dinners, and drinks. In a November 18, 2002, in a recorded telephone conversation, he told Elmann (the "fixer") that he had just spent two hours getting Garson drunk, and that "[h]e'll do what we want."

On the morning he was arrested, Siminovsky was taken to the Fort Hamilton army base in Bay Ridge for questioning. He confessed within half an hour, and subsequently confessed to bribery. He made a deal with the investigators, agreeing to cooperate in the investigation of Garson in exchange for a reduced charge (a plea bargain), and the promise of a positive letter from the DA to Siminovsky's sentencing judge. Within hours, he was wearing a hidden body microphone in a sting operation, as he joined Garson for lunch at the Archives Restaurant on Adams Street. He continued to wear the wire for weeks in meetings with Garson.

Siminovsky testified for 13 days at two different trials and ultimately helped prosecutors win convictions for nine people. Siminovsky, himself, as part of his plea bargain, pleaded guilty to a Class A misdemeanor for having given unlawful gratuities. In June 2007, Acting Supreme Court Justice Jeffrey G. Berry, a visiting judge from Orange County, New York, sentenced him to a year in prison, the maximum sentence for the misdemeanor. He also lost his license to practice law, and agreed never to apply for reinstatement.

==== Bribers ====
Ezra Zifrani and his daughter Esther Weitzner pleaded guilty in February 2004 to one misdemeanor conspiracy charge. They admitted having given $5,000 to Elmann (the "fixer"), to influence Garson's handling of a custody dispute between Weitzner and her ex-husband involving their five children. They said that Elman "clearly implied" he was going to bribe Garson. They did not know, however, whether the money was actually paid to Garson. Supreme Court Justice Michael Ambrosio ruled in August 2004 that Weizner was an unfit parent for her children, because she paid the bribe. In exchange for their pleas and their cooperation in the investigation, in August 2007 they were each sentenced to 210 hours of community service and three years of probation.

Avraham Levi pleaded guilty in June 2004 to having given the "fixer" $10,000 in December 2002, to get his case in front of and obtain favorable treatment from Garson (a Class E felony). There was no evidence that the money ever made its way to Garson. Subsequent to the husband's payment to the fixer, Garson awarded him exclusive custody of the couple's two oldest sons. Garson did not have an opportunity to rule on the couple's house, because he was arrested beforehand. In 2005, after the bribery scandal had broken and the case was moved to another judge, 100% of the marital residence was awarded to the wife.

For his role in the corruption scandal, Justice Berry sentenced Levi to three months in jail, 150 hours of community service, and five years' probation following his release.

==== Court officer and court clerk ====
Louis Salerno (a 24-year-veteran court officer, who had been placed on modified duty) and Paul Sarnell (Garson's former senior court clerk, who had retired in 2002) were tried for allegedly accepting bribes to steer Simonivsky's cases to Garson. Their five-week trial ended in August 2004.

Prosecutors charged that Elmann would send potential clients to Siminovsky, who would then in turn enlist Salerno or Sarnell to steer his clients' divorce cases (which were supposed to be assigned randomly) to Garson. Prosecutors said that when Siminovsky needed a case to come before Garson, the defendants would go to an administrative clerk and tell her that Garson wanted the case reassigned to him. According to the prosecutors, the defendants received thousands of dollars in cash, plane tickets, and plastic bags of electronic equipment from Elmann's warehouse for their efforts.

Siminovsky testified at their trial. He said that after Salerno demanded $2,000 in order to have a Siminovsky case assigned to Garson, Siminovsky slipped the money into Salerno's pocket as they stood at adjacent urinals in a public courthouse restroom in Brooklyn. The court officer was also videotaped accepting a DVD player and VCRs from the lawyer in front of the Joralemon Street courthouse on March 27, 2003. Salerno was convicted of two felonies, bribe-receiving and receiving a reward for official misconduct, and sentenced in August 2007 to 1–4½ years in prison.

Sarnell's counsel maintained that anything improper that Sarnell might have done was done on Garson's orders. Sarnell was acquitted.

==== "Fixer" ====
In February 2005, Nissim Elmann, portrayed by prosecutors as a "fixer", pleaded guilty to seven felonies and six misdemeanors. He had been charged with bribery and conspiracy, for accepting bribes in divorce and child custody cases that he steered to Garson.

Elmann was a Crown Heights, Brooklyn, wholesale electronics dealer and salesman, with a business named "DVD Trading" on Brooklyn Avenue. He himself had appeared before Garson as a divorce litigant in 2000. He subsequently boasted in the Orthodox Jewish community in central Brooklyn, beginning in 2001, that for a price he could help parties in divorce cases make sure their case was heard by a sympathetic judge.

Elmann admitted to accepting thousands of dollars of cash (including $24,000 from three divorce litigants), and passing them on to Siminovsky to arrange preferential treatment for litigants in six cases before Garson. Though Elmann had asserted to his potential clients that he had direct contact with Garson (telling one mother, for example: "He will do everything for me. The problem is how much [will] you sacrifice?"), evidence later showed that he only had contact with Siminovsky, and he later admitted he did not know the judge.

Elmann was sentenced in August 2007 to 16 months−5½ years in prison, with Justice Berry saying "Justice is not for sale." Elmann was denied parole in 2008, and was not eligible to try again until July 2010.

=== Other ramifications ===
Fifty motions to reopen divorce cases that had been handled by Garson were received by New York's chief administrative judge for matrimonial cases. Of those, three or four were granted a hearing, and eventually settled. However, even in cases that involved both Garson and Siminovsky, rulings were not necessarily reviewed or overturned. To receive a hearing, parties were required to demonstrate some likelihood that they had not received a fair trial. Criticizing a process that required parties who did not have subpoena powers or wiretaps to prove corruption in each case, the President of the New York State chapter of the National Organization for Women said: "The burden of proof is going to fall on them to show the case is corrupted; and how are they going to do that?"

The system of nominating judges was ruled unconstitutional by New York's Second Circuit. However, upon appeal to the Supreme Court that ruling was reversed. https://www.law.cornell.edu/supct/html/06-766.ZO.html Justice Scalia wrote the opinion. Justice Stevens wrote a concurring opinion in which Justice Souter joined, where he quoted Justice Thurgood Marshall in a scathing criticism of New York State's judicial election laws in that "The Constitution does not prohibit legislatures from enacting stupid laws." https://www.law.cornell.edu/supct/html/06-766.ZC.html Prosecutors also complained of a "culture of corruption" in the court's matrimonial section, and Garson's case led to a widespread political and judicial corruption inquiry in Brooklyn.

The TV show Law and Order aired an episode entitled "Floater" on November 12, 2003, relating to a corruption scandal in Brooklyn Supreme Court in which a judge accepted bribes in return for giving litigants preferential treatment. The episode was "ripped from the headlines" of the Garson matter. Correspondent Lesley Stahl reported the Garson story for CBS's 48 Hours on February 18, 2005. In addition, Frieda Hanimov was compared to whistle-blower Erin Brockovich, and Warner Brothers purchased the rights to a movie entitled The Frieda Hanimov Story.

=== Democratic Party sting cooperation ===
When Garson was arrested, he was confronted with surveillance videotapes from a video camera that the DA's Office had installed in his robing room chambers' ceiling pursuant to a December 9, 2002, warrant. After seeing the videotapes, he agreed to wear a wire to secretly tape conversations with Democratic Party leaders. His goal was to gather evidence that a seat on the bench could be purchased by paying cash to the county Democratic Party and to Norman, the Democratic Party leader who had helped place Garson on the bench. But he was unsuccessful in his effort to tape Democratic Party officials discussing buying and selling judgeships.

Norman was convicted, however, due to information that prosecutors say Garson provided. Norman was sent to prison for extortion, soliciting illegal contributions from a lobbyist, and stealing $5,000 from his re-election committee.

== Trial and conviction (2007) ==
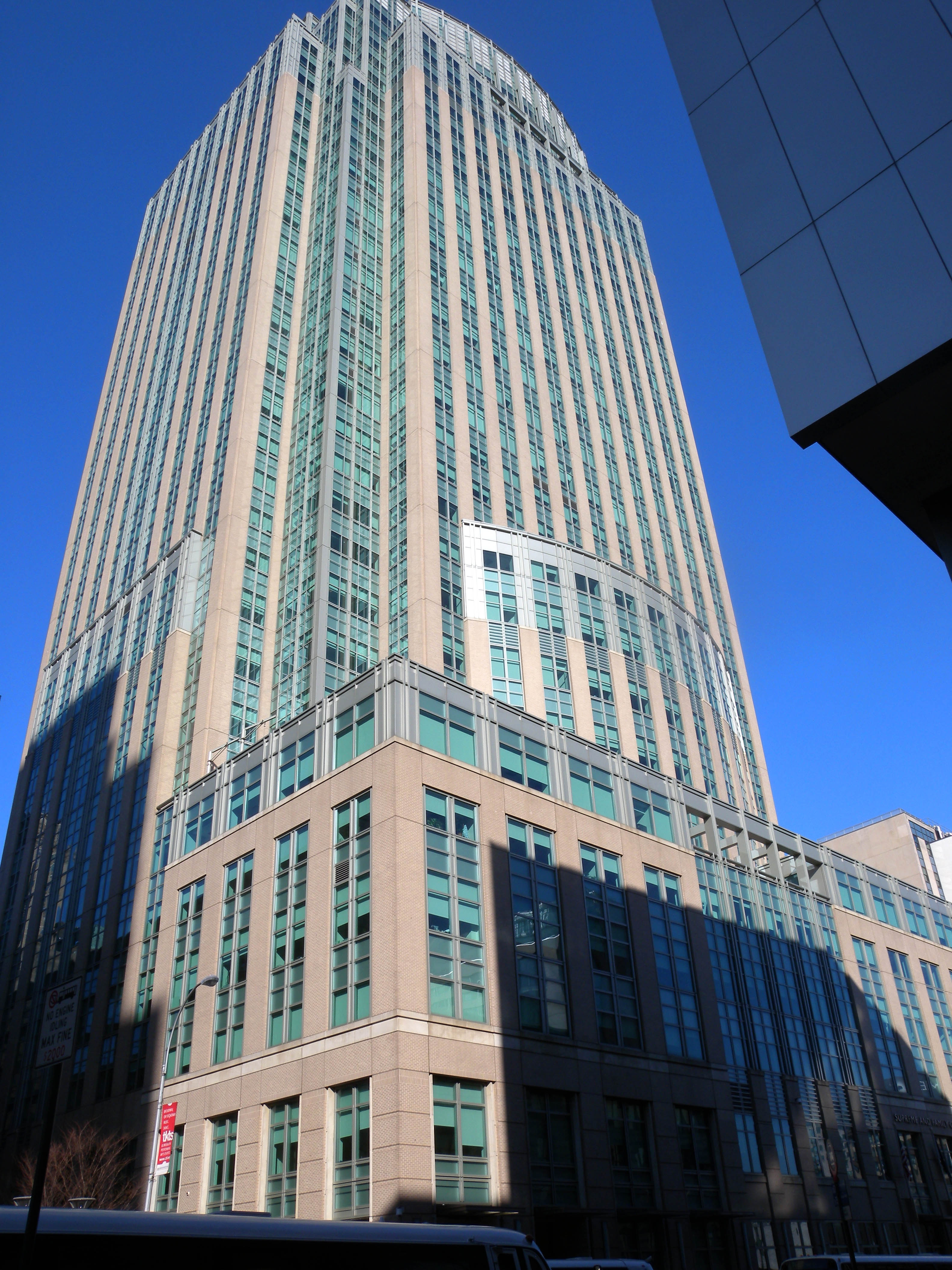
New York Supreme Court, Brooklyn, New York

The audience for Garson's four-week trial "included a good number of displeased divorcées", observed The New York Times. as well as members of various divorce Advocacy groups including The Alliance to Restore Integrity in Divorce and the National Organization of Women, who daily attended the proceedings. The trial took place in New York State Supreme Court, on Jay Street in Downtown Brooklyn. The prosecution alleged that Garson had an agreement with divorce lawyer Siminovsky whereby the lawyer gave Garson cash, drinks, dinners, and cigars in exchange for courtroom assignments and favored treatment.

=== Videotapes ===
The prosecutors entered into evidence secretly taped video surveillance recordings.

In a surveillance videotape made on February 5, 2003, of a private meeting in Garson's chambers, Siminovsky asked Garson if he would award the couple's home to his client, Avraham Levi. Garson responded: "I'll award him exclusive use." He gave Siminovsky detailed instructions as to how to argue the Levi divorce case before him. He assured Siminovsky that if he followed Garson's instructions: "The worst possible scenario is a win ... You're in good shape. You're a winner either way. And your schmuck [Avraham Levi] doesn't deserve it." Garson dictated to Siminovsky the exact language the lawyer should use in a memo to Garson. He urged him to charge his client extra for the memo, saying: "I am telling you, charge for it. This is extra; this was not contemplated; the judge made me do it ... Squeeze the guy." Referring to the estranged wife (Sigal Levi), the judge said: "She's fucked."

Garson also coached Siminovsky as to how to examine a witness regarding the amount of money the wife had earned from a school she operated. He said:

You'll put him on the stand. You go through, 'In evidence is a record book kept by ba ba boom, there's an average of so many students per month. The book indicates the approximate rate of $350–400 a month per student ... '

Garson coached Siminovsky over lunch on February 25, 2003, as to what to have his client say in a case Garson was hearing. With his conversation captured on an audiotape played at the trial, he advised Siminovsky:

Just have [your client] deny a few things. Like, 'Did she give you money every day to deposit?' 'No.' 'Did she go to the bank every day? She said she went to the bank every day. Is that true?' 'No.' 'Did you ever, ever take any cash?' 'Absolutely not.'

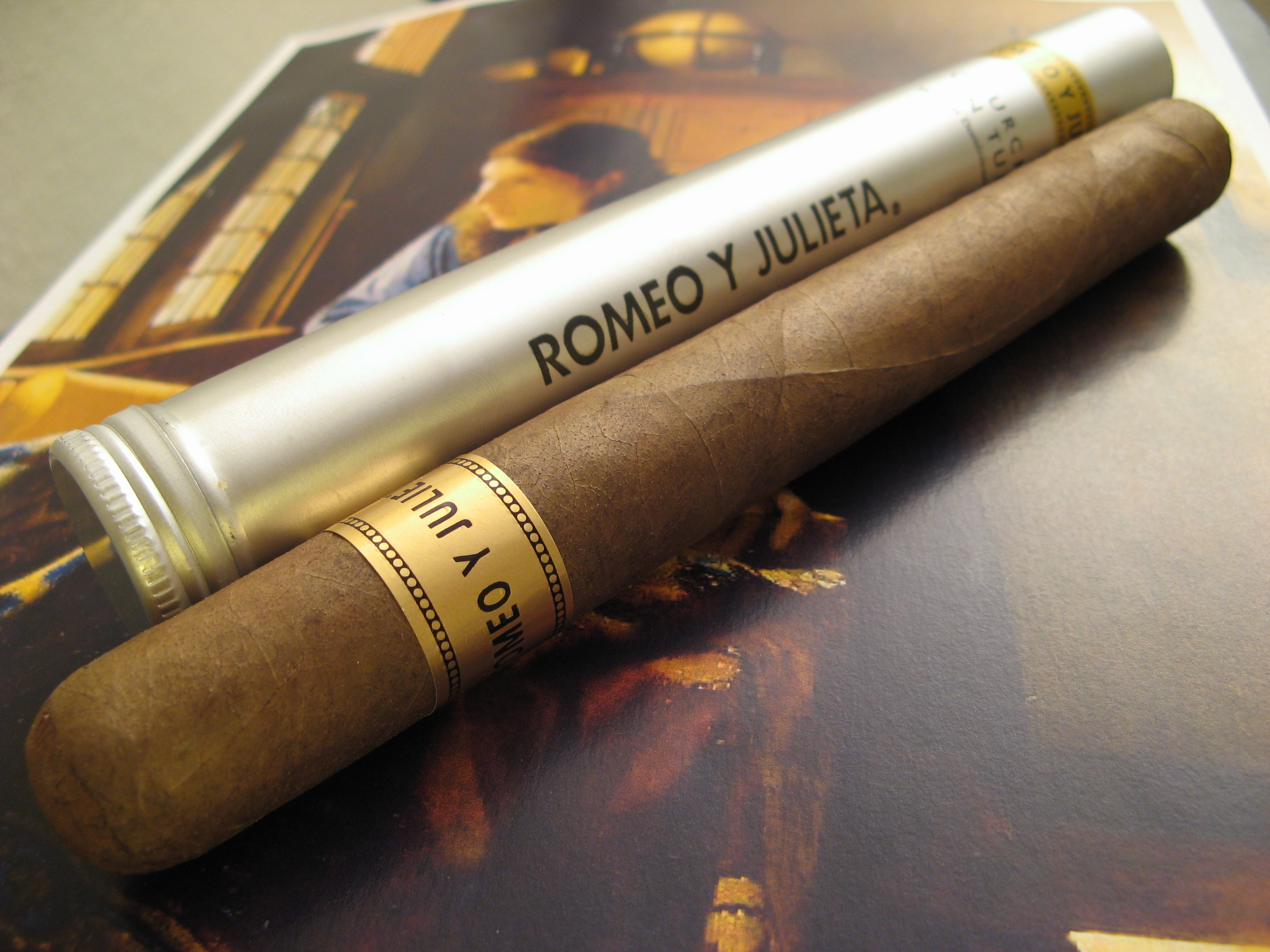
Romeo y Julieta cigar. Siminovsky gave Garson a box of the Dominican cigars.

Another recording showed Siminovsky (at this point, part of a sting operation targeting Garson) giving the judge a $250 box of 25 "Romeo y Julieta" Dominican cigars on March 3, 2010. The cigars were supplied to Siminovsky by the DA's Office.

An additional recording showed Siminovsky in the judge's robing room on March 10, 2003. He handed Garson an envelope containing a $1,000 cash "referral fee". The cash had been supplied to Siminovsky by the DA's Office, as part of the sting operation. Garson initially refused to accept the money. He then tried to return it, suggesting that Siminovsky contribute it to Garson's wife's judicial campaign instead. But Siminovsky threw the money back on the judge's desk, saying he would make a campaign contribution as well, but telling the judge to keep the cash. Garson picked up the money, and tried to hand it to Siminovsky once again, saying "I appreciate it. No, no, no ... No." But then, sighing, he put the money in his desk drawer. Siminovsky was instructed by the DA to duck Garson's repeated calls that day and the next, anticipating Garson's attempts to return the money. When Garson was arrested a few days later on his way to work, the envelope containing the sting money was in his pocket. The box of cigars, purchased by the DA's office as part of the sting operation, had been placed in Garson's desk drawer in his robing room by Siminovsky, where they remained unopened and untouched until months later when the DA asked Garson's attorney to retrieve them. The explanation for this was not revealed in court.

In another videotaped exchange, they improperly discussed the outcome of a divorce case the lawyer had pending before the judge. Garson assured Siminovsky, saying: "You know what? Justice is being done." This was in a case where Garson is heard saying that neither parent was a suitable guardian but that he had no choice. Garson is heard lamenting that Siminovsky's client doesn't deserve it but that the other side didn't have a winning legal position about the shared home. Garson had found that the other side had lied about finances and operation of a daycare center and who had actually paid for the house the family lived in. Segal Levy was a friend of Haminov and had been told about the sting and coached about what to say in court.

=== Other evidence ===
In addition, prosecutors provided financial records as evidence, as well as testimony from Siminovsky. Siminovsky testified that he entertained the judge with lunches, dinners, and drinks, nearly always paying the bill, and gave him money and cigars, in exchange for favorable treatment and 3 more legal assignments than the next highest number of assignments to a lawyer. Siminovsky co-chaired the committee that evaluated and approved attorneys to represent children. The prosecution alleged that before Siminovsky began cooperating with prosecutors, he had already entertained Garson more than 40 times, spending $3,149.

The lead prosecutor said that he had asked Garson: "Why did you do this with Siminovsky? Why did you take care of him?" And that Garson had replied: "I like him. And he kind of reminded me of myself."

=== Conviction ===
Garson was convicted in April 2007 of bribery in the third degree, a Class D felony, in violation of New York Penal Law § 200.10. The jury found that he had accepted thousands of dollars in drinks and meals from Siminovsky in exchange for improperly giving the lawyer advice in a case Siminovsky had before Garson, as well as court-assigned appointments and free access to Garson and "showing Siminovsky more courtesy than he did many other lawyers". Garson was never accused of "fixing" cases.

Garson was also convicted of two lesser charges, relating to his accepting a box of cigars and $1,000 in cash from Siminovsky for having referred two clients. The charges were for receiving a reward for official misconduct in the second degree (a class E felony; the lowest under New York law, in violation of New York Penal Law § 200.25). The jury acquitted him on four other counts of receiving rewards for official misconduct in the second degree. Additionally, Garson was automatically disbarred as an attorney as a result of his felony convictions.

== Sentencing, prison, and release (2007–09) ==
On June 5, 2007, Justice Berry imposed three consecutive sentences on Garson, which resulted in an aggregate sentence of between 3.5 and 10 years in prison. Garson cried in court, and said he was "profoundly sorry" for his actions. His lawyers pleaded for leniency on the basis of his reported alcoholism, bladder cancer, and other medical conditions. Berry rejected Garson's pleas for leniency, saying:

You should have been beyond reproach. The people of Brooklyn deserve more from you. You are not some bum. You're an intelligent man. You went to Penn, and Penn Law School.

His lawyer tried to delay his sentence on account of Garson's granddaughter's death, and so he could care for his mentally disabled grown son. He entered an alcohol detoxification program for six days, after which on June 28, 2007, he surrendered at State Supreme Court in Brooklyn to begin serving his sentence.

Until May 2009, he was isolated in protective custody at the Mid-State Correctional Facility in Marcy, New York, 180 miles from New York City. From then on, he was in the general population at the Mid-Orange Correctional Facility in Warwick, New York, 60 miles from New York City.

Garson was granted an early release from prison, obtaining parole six months before the term of his minimum sentence had run. He was granted parole in his first appearance before the New York State Parole Board, over the DA's Office's strong opposition, and released from a Harlem halfway house on December 23, 2009. He was released early as a result of his completion of a substance abuse program, and good behavior. Conditions of his release included that through June 2017 he abide by curfews set by his probation officer, not associate with any law firms, not drink alcohol, and at the discretion of his parole officer attend an alcohol abuse treatment program and submit to substance abuse testing. A spokesperson for the Parole Board said it was relatively rare for a non-violent felon to receive parole the first time he appeared before the board, as only 21% did so in 2008. If he had been denied parole, he would have had to wait an additional two years before he could re-apply.

Garson had also appealed his conviction. But his appeal was denied on January 5, 2010, by the Supreme Court of the State of New York Appellate Division, Second Judicial Department. It opined that the evidence of his guilt was "overwhelming".

== Family ==
Garson's second wife was Robin Garson. A Brooklyn Law School graduate, and an election lawyer for the Kings County Democratic Committee (helping eliminate party opponents from the ballot and was a member of the legal team representing DA Hynes in 2001.) and chaired or was a member of several state and local bar committees. In 2002, having been nominated by the Democratic Party for a judgeship on the Brooklyn Civil Court (a level below New York Supreme Court), she won her election and became a judge on the court, and was reelected in 2012. In 2011, she was appointed by NY's Chief Administrative Judge to serve as an Acting Justice of the Supreme Court of the State of NY.

Garson and his wife were married for more than two decades. Garson had four children, and a number of grandchildren.
