= 93Queen =

- Directed by: Paula Eiselt
- Release date: 2018
- Running time: 90 minutes
- Country: United States
- Language: English

93Queen is a 2018 American documentary film on Hasidic women in Borough Park, Brooklyn who form Ezras Nashim, an all-female ambulance corps. The film follows Judge Rachel Freier, a Hasidic lawyer running for public office as a New York Judge, and mother of six who is determined to shake up the “boys' club” in her Hasidic community by creating the first all-female ambulance corps in the United States, as she negotiates her community initiative within the context of a male-dominated Hasidic community.

93Queen was filmed in the Hasidic community of Borough Park where emergency medical service corps have long been the province of men. The neighborhood is home to Hatzolah, the largest volunteer ambulance corps in the world known, which refused to hire female EMTs as a matter of policy.

The film followed the formation and launch of Ezras Nashim through the organization’s first year on the ground. Freier and the Hasidic women are taking matters into their own hands to provide dignified emergency medical care to the Hasidic women and girls. The thematic core of the film is the creation of the organization against very difficult odds, in a society where most women don’t drive and a few minutes can mean the difference between life and death, and how female EMTs transport themselves to the scene of an emergency.

The film run time is 90 minutes, and was produced by American Documentary-POV and ITVS. The documentary was directed by film-maker Paula Eiselt. and Co-Produced by Heidi Reinberg, and Marco Williams.

The film made its world premiere on May 1, 2018, at the Hot Docs Canadian International Documentary Festival. The film aired on PBS's POV, marking its television debut, on September 17, 2018.

== See also ==
- Shekinah Rising (2013)
- Punk Jews (2012)
- Hasidic hipsters
