= Rodneyse Bichotte Hermelyn =

American politician

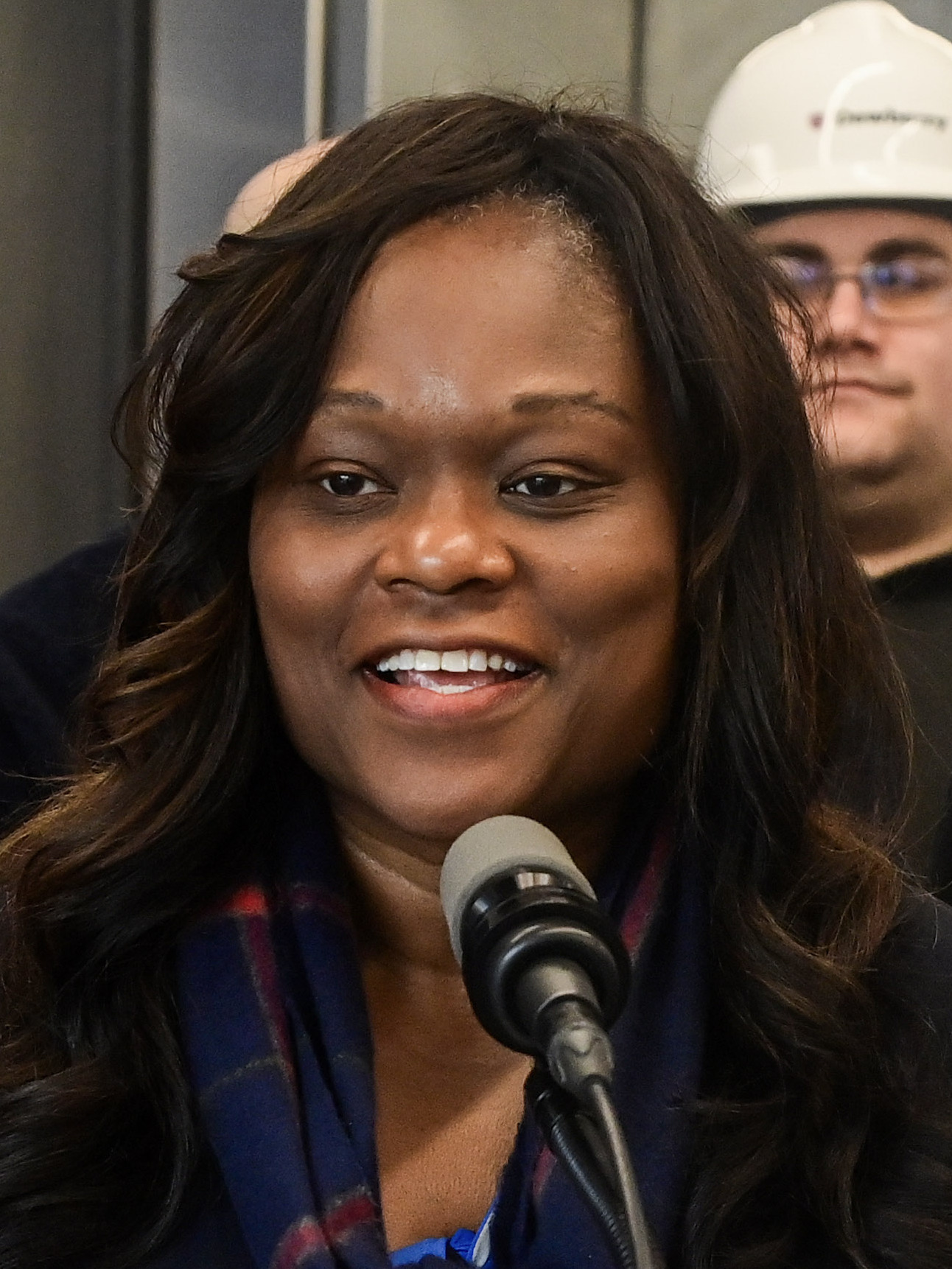
- Hermelyn in 2025

Chair of the Brooklyn Democratic Party
- In office January 20, 2020 – September 23, 2026
- Preceded by: Frank Seddio
- Succeeded by: Nydia Velázquez (acting)

Member of the New York State Assembly from the 42nd district
- Incumbent
- Assumed office January 1, 2015
- Preceded by: Rhoda S. Jacobs

Personal details
- Born: Rodneyse Bichotte; December 2, 1972 (age 53) New York City, New York, U.S.
- Party: Democratic
- Spouse: Edu Hermelyn (m. 2020)
- Education: Buffalo State College (BS); University at Buffalo (BS); Illinois Institute of Technology (MS); Northwestern University (MBA); Brooklyn Law School (JD)
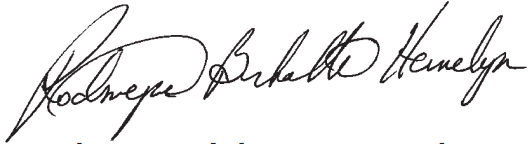
- Signature
- Website: Assembly website

Rodneyse Bichotte Hermelyn (born December 2, 1972) is an American politician who serves as the Assembly Member for the 42nd District of the New York State Assembly. She is a Democrat. The district includes portions of East Flatbush, Flatbush, Ditmas Park, and Midwood, in Brooklyn.

Bichotte Hermelyn was the first Haitian-American to be elected to the State Legislature from New York City, as well as Chair of the Kings County Democratic Committee.

== Early life and education ==
Bichotte Hermelyn was born and raised in Brooklyn, New York to Haitian immigrants, and attended public schools, graduating from LaGuardia High School. She has a B.S. in electrical engineering from SUNY Buffalo, a B.S. in mathematics in secondary education and a B.T. in electrical engineering from Buffalo State College, an M.B.A from Northwestern University, and an M.S. from the Illinois Institute of Technology. She is also an alumna of the White House Project, a leadership program created by Brooklyn College. In 2024, she graduated from Brooklyn Law School and was elected to the school's board of trustees following her graduation.

On January 1, 2020, she married Brooklyn District Leader Edu Hermelyn.

== Career ==
Prior to public service, Bichotte Hermelyn worked as an engineer at Lucent Technologies, as an investment banker at Bank of America and JPMorgan Chase, and as a math teacher in the New York City public school system. She was laid off from her investment banking role after three years in the industry in August 2008 during the 2008 financial crisis. She is known as an avid traveler, and has traveled to seven countries on the continent of Africa, as well as several countries in Asia, Europe, Latin America and the Middle East, including Israel.

Bichotte Hermelyn serves as a Democratic District Leader for her district in Brooklyn.

=== New York Assembly ===
In 2012, Bichotte Hermelyn opted to take on longtime Assemblywoman Rhoda Jacobs, who despite fast-changing demographic shifts had won the 42nd District easily as a white, Jewish woman in an African-American, Caribbean community. Bichotte Hermelyn, who is of Haitian descent, challenged Jacobs in the Democratic primary, but lost to the incumbent 67% to 32%.

The following cycle in 2014, Jacobs decided to retire, and Bichotte Hermelyn announced her campaign for the Assembly. In a four-way primary, Bichotte Hermelyn won the nomination with 48% of the vote. In the safely-Democratic seat, she went on to win the general election with over 90% of the vote.

Bichotte Hermelyn was sworn into office on January 1, 2015, with New York City Mayor Bill de Blasio administering the oath of office. In the Assembly, she serves as Chair of the Subcommittee on Oversight of Minority and Women-Owned Business Enterprises (MWBEs).

In 2023, Bichotte Hermelyn was appointed Majority Whip for the Democratic Caucus of the New York State Assembly.

In December 2020, Governor Andrew Cuomo signed Assemblywoman Hermelyn's bill into a law called Jonah Bichotte Cowan's Law. This statewide law prevents hospital employees from turning away pregnant women with a history of health problems.

=== Brooklyn Democratic Party ===
In January 2020, Bichotte Hermelyn was chosen to succeed Frank Seddio as Brooklyn Democratic Party Chair, making her both the first woman and first African-American woman to lead a county party in New York City.

In 2026, Bichotte Hermelyn faced a challenge from reform-aligned district leaders who had won 22 of Brooklyn's 42 district-leader seats in the June 23 primary. On August 19, Bichotte Hermelyn proposed changes to party rules that would allow additional people to vote in party leadership elections, including county committee officers and former party chairs. The proposed changes drew criticism from Democratic officials across Brooklyn, who argued that they would dilute the influence of newly elected district leaders and preserve Bichotte Hermelyn's position as chair. The proposal was compared in media reports to a similar tactic used by former Brooklyn Democratic Party chair Vito Lopez.

Despite a trial and appellate court striking down the rules, Bichotte Hermelyn pushed forward with a September 23rd meeting of the party including the expanded committee. During the meeting, party leadership failed to advance a candidate for chair and U.S. Representative Nydia Velázquez was declared interim chair of the party by a New York Supreme Court justice in October 2026.
