= New York's 43rd State Assembly district =

American legislative district

Assemblymember
| Brian Cunningham; D–Flatbush |

The 43rd Assembly district of New York is one of the 150 districts in the New York State Assembly. It is currently represented by Democrat Brian Cunningham since 2022.

== Leadership ==
The 43rd State Assembly district of New York is currently represented by Brian Cunningham, following a special election in 2022. He succeeded Assemblywoman Diana Richardson, following her appointment as Brooklyn Deputy Borough President. Richardson was the first candidate to be elected in 2015 on the Working Families Party line. Following that election, her election victories have been on the Democratic Party line.

== Geography ==
=== 2020s ===
The 43rd district is in Brooklyn, centered around Prospect Lefferts Gardens and most of Crown Heights, with portions of Flatbush and East Flatbush.

The district is entirely within New York's 9th congressional district, and overlaps the 20th and 21st districts of the New York State Senate, and the 35th, 36th, 40th and 41st districts of the New York City Council.

=== 2010s ===
The 43rd district is in Brooklyn, comprising the neighborhoods of Prospect Lefferts Gardens and Crown Heights.

== Recent election results ==
=== 2026 ===
2026 New York State Assembly election, District 43
Primary election
| Party | Candidate | Votes | % |
|---|---|---|---|
| Democratic | Brian Cunningham (incumbent) | 10,180 | 80.8 |
| Democratic | Ahron Gluck | 2,325 | 18.5 |
| Write-in | | 88 | 0.7 |
| Total votes | | 12,593 | 100.0 |
General election
| Democratic | Brian Cunningham | | |
| Working Families | Brian Cunningham | | |
| Total | Brian Cunningham (incumbent) | | |
| Republican | Anna Shpilkovskaya | | |
| Write-in | | | |
| Total votes | | | 100.0 |

=== 2024 ===
2024 New York State Assembly election, District 43
| Party | Candidate | Votes | % |
|---|---|---|---|
| Democratic | Brian Cunningham | 37,884 | |
| Working Families | Brian Cunningham | 5,538 | |
| Total | Brian Cunningham (incumbent) | 43,422 | 99.4 |
| Write-in | | 243 | 0.6 |
| Total votes | | 43,665 | 100.0 |
| Democratic hold | | | |

=== 2022 general ===
2022 New York State Assembly election, District 43
Primary election
| Party | Candidate | Votes | % |
|---|---|---|---|
| Democratic | Brian Cunningham (incumbent) | 6,625 | 59.1 |
| Democratic | Jelanie DeShong | 2,186 | 19.5 |
| Democratic | Tim Hunter | 1,491 | 13.3 |
| Democratic | Pierre Albert | 910 | 8.1 |
| Write-in | | 25 | 0.2 |
| Total votes | | 11,237 | 100.0 |
General election
| Democratic | Brian Cunningham | 23,997 | |
| Working Families | Brian Cunningham | 5,515 | |
| Total | Brian Cunningham (incumbent) | 29,512 | 99.5 |
| Write-in | | 156 | 0.5 |
| Total votes | | 29,668 | 100.0 |
| Democratic hold | | | |

=== 2022 special ===
Incumbent Diana Richardson resigned her seat on February 4, 2022 to serve as Deputy Borough President of Brooklyn under Antonio Reynoso, triggering a special election. In special elections for state legislative offices, primaries are usually not held – county committee members and district leaders for each party select nominees.

2022 New York State Assembly special election, District 43
| Party | Candidate | Votes | % |
|---|---|---|---|
| Democratic | Brian Cunningham | 2,074 | 63.2 |
| Working Families | Jelanie DeShong | 1,104 | 33.6 |
| Republican | Mesidor Azor | 68 | |
| Conservative | Mesidor Azor | 27 | |
| Total | Mesidor Azor | 95 | 2.9 |
| Write-in | | 9 | 0.3 |
| Total votes | | 3,283 | 100.0 |
| Democratic hold | | | |

=== 2020 ===
2020 New York State Assembly election, District 43
Primary election
| Party | Candidate | Votes | % |
|---|---|---|---|
| Democratic | Diana Richardson (incumbent) | 14,536 | 74.7 |
| Democratic | Jesse Hamilton | 4,882 | 25.1 |
| Write-in | | 45 | 0.2 |
| Total votes | | 19,463 | 100.0 |
General election
| Democratic | Diana Richardson (incumbent) | 43,629 | 89.1 |
| Republican | Menachem Raitport | 5,277 | 10.8 |
| Write-in | | 54 | 0.1 |
| Total votes | | 48,960 | 100.0 |
| Democratic gain from Working Families | | | |

=== 2018 ===
2018 New York State Assembly election, District 43
| Party | Candidate | Votes | % |
|---|---|---|---|
| Democratic | Diana Richardson | 32,610 | |
| Working Families | Diana Richardson | 2,985 | |
| Total | Diana Richardson (incumbent) | 35,595 | 99.6 |
| Write-in | | 131 | 0.4 |
| Total votes | | 35,726 | 100.0 |
| Working Families hold | | | |

=== 2016 ===
2016 New York State Assembly election, District 43
| Party | Candidate | Votes | % |
|---|---|---|---|
| Democratic | Diana Richardson | 36,724 | |
| Working Families | Diana Richardson | 2,750 | |
| Total | Diana Richardson (incumbent) | 39,474 | 99.5 |
| Write-in | | 198 | 0.5 |
| Total votes | | 39,672 | 100.0 |
| Working Families hold | | | |

=== 2015 special ===
Incumbent Karim Camara resigned his seat on February 20, 2015 to serve as Executive Director of the Governor’s Office of Faith Based Community Development Services under then-Governor Andrew Cuomo, triggering a special election. In special elections for state legislative offices, primaries are usually not held – county committee members and district leaders for each party select nominees. Guillermo Philpotts, a member of the district's county committee, was chosen as the Democratic nominee by an "unusually small county committee" made up mostly of his own friends and family, whom he had nominated. However, Guillermo Philpotts failed to file the proper paperwork, leaving the Democratic ballot line empty.

2015 New York State Assembly special election, District 43
| Party | Candidate | Votes | % |
|---|---|---|---|
| Working Families | Diana Richardson | 4,284 | 49.7 |
| Independence | Shirley Patterson | 2,160 | 25.1 |
| Republican | Menachem Raitport | 1,370 | |
| Conservative | Menachem Raitport | 448 | |
| Total | Menachem Raitport | 1,818 | 21.1 |
| Love Yourself | Geoffrey Davis | 333 | 3.9 |
| Write-in | | 17 | 0.2 |
| Total votes | | 8,612 | 100.0 |
| Working Families gain from Democratic | | | |

=== 2014 ===
2014 New York State Assembly election, District 43
| Party | Candidate | Votes | % |
|---|---|---|---|
| Democratic | Karim Camara | 13,631 | |
| Working Families | Karim Camara | 1,359 | |
| Total | Karim Camara (incumbent) | 15,170 | 95.8 |
| Conservative | Cartrell Gore | 654 | 4.1 |
| Write-in | | 12 | 0.1 |
| Total votes | | 15,836 | 100.0 |
| Democratic hold | | | |

=== 2012 ===
2012 New York State Assembly election, District 43
| Party | Candidate | Votes | % |
|---|---|---|---|
| Democratic | Karim Camara | 33,460 | |
| Working Families | Karim Camara | 1,101 | |
| Total | Karim Camara (incumbent) | 34,561 | 94.9 |
| Republican | Stuart Balberg | 1,391 | |
| Conservative | Stuart Balberg | 449 | |
| Total | Stuart Balberg | 1,840 | 5.1 |
| Write-in | | 12 | 0.0 |
| Total votes | | 36,413 | 100.0 |
| Democratic hold | | | |

=== 2010 ===
2010 New York State Assembly election, District 43
| Party | Candidate | Votes | % |
|---|---|---|---|
| Democratic | Karim Camara | 16,501 | |
| Working Families | Karim Camara | 1,422 | |
| Total | Karim Camara (incumbent) | 17,923 | 92.1 |
| Republican | Menachem Raitport | 1,248 | |
| Conservative | Menachem Raitport | 290 | |
| Total | Menachem Raitport | 1,538 | 7.9 |
| Write-in | | 5 | 0.0 |
| Total votes | | 19,466 | 100.0 |
| Democratic hold | | | |

=== Federal results in Assembly District 43 ===
| Year | Office | Results |
|---|---|---|
| 2024 | President | Harris 82.2 - 15.4% |
| 2024 | Senate | Gillibrand 87.7 - 11.1% |
| 2022 | Senate | Schumer 86.0 - 13.4% |
| 2020 | President | Biden 88.0 - 11.1% |
| 2018 | Senate | Gillibrand 93.9 - 6.0% |
| 2016 | President | Clinton 89.0 - 8.1% |
| 2016 | Senate | Schumer 90.9 - 5.8% |
| 2012 | President | Obama 92.7 - 6.7% |
| 2012 | Senate | Gillibrand 94.1 - 5.1% |
