= Little Caribbean, Brooklyn =

Little Caribbean
- Neighborhood in Brooklyn
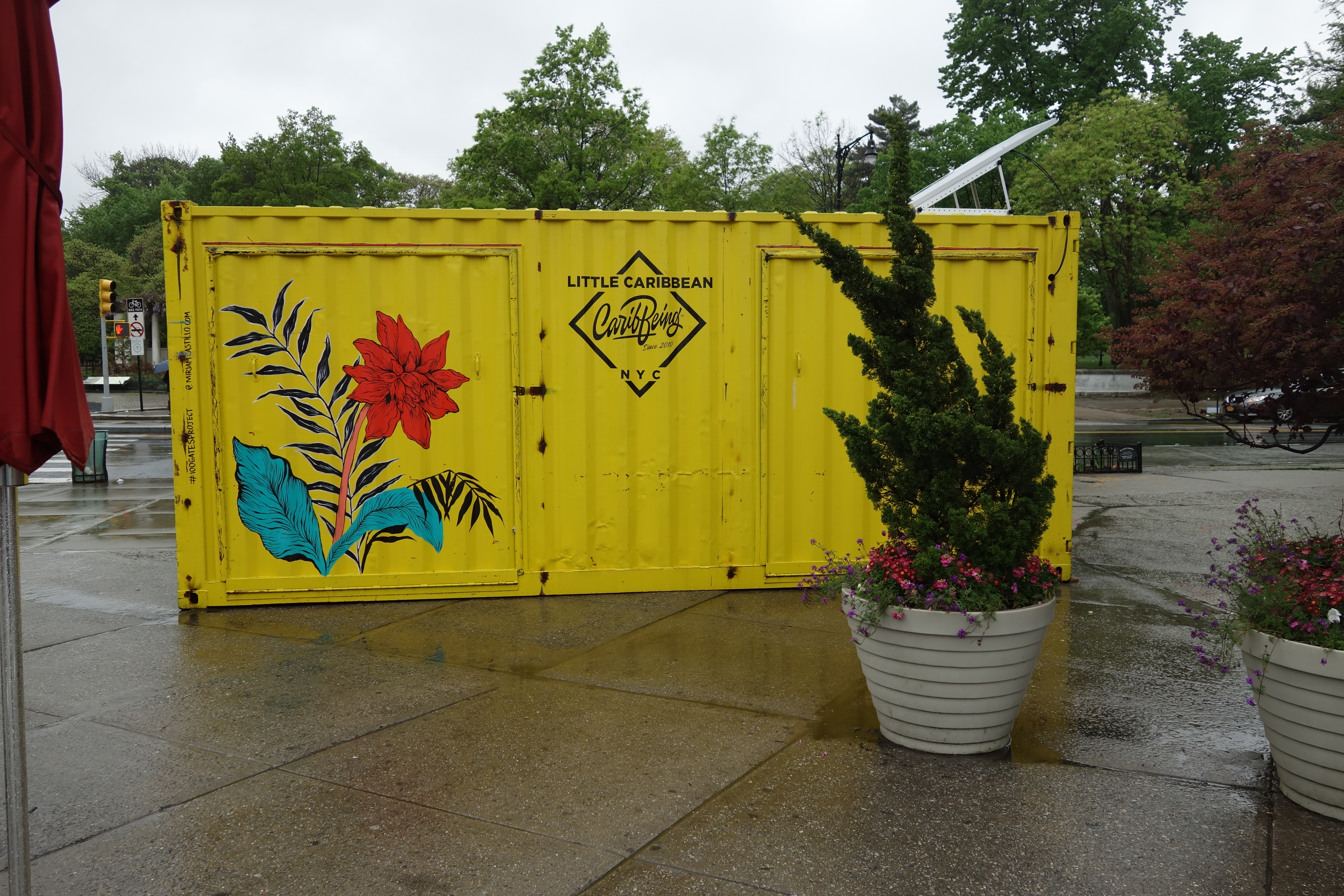
- The caribBEING House, an upcycled shipping container used as a mobile art, culture, and market space that hosts exhibitions, cultural happenings and curated pop-up shops. Photo taken at Parkside Plaza.

- Location in New York City
- Coordinates: 40.6505°N 73.9668°W
- Country: United States
- State: New York
- City: New York City
- Borough: Brooklyn
- Community District: Brooklyn 17

Little Caribbean is a cultural district in central Brooklyn, New York City, encompassing portions of the neighborhoods of Flatbush, Prospect Lefferts Gardens, and East Flatbush. Located along the commercial corridors of Flatbush Avenue, Church Avenue, Nostrand Avenue, and Utica Avenue, it is home to the largest and most diverse Caribbean diaspora community outside of the West Indies. The district was officially designated in September 2017 through efforts led by Shelley Worrell and the organization I AM caribBEING, making it the first and only officially recognized Little Caribbean in the world.

== Geography ==
Little Caribbean is situated south and east of Prospect Park in central Brooklyn. The district's boundaries are not precisely defined but are generally understood to encompass the commercial corridors along Flatbush Avenue from Empire Boulevard south to Brooklyn College, Church Avenue (co-named Bob Marley Boulevard), Nostrand Avenue, and Utica Avenue. The neighborhood overlaps with portions of Community District 9, Community District 14, and Community District 17.

The area is served by several New York City Subway lines, including the B and Q trains on the Brighton Line, the 2 and 5 trains on the IRT Nostrand Avenue Line, and various bus routes operated by MTA Regional Bus Operations.

== History ==
=== Early settlement and demographic shifts ===
The area encompassing present-day Little Caribbean was originally part of the Dutch colonial town of Flatbush, one of the six original European settlements on Long Island. Following consolidation into Greater New York in 1898 and the extension of the subway system in the early 20th century, the area developed into middle-class neighborhoods populated largely by Jewish and Italian American families.

=== First wave (1880s-1920s) ===
The first large-scale wave of immigration from Caribbean countries took place between the 1880s and 1920s. Immigrants formed mutual aid organizations such as the West Indian Benevolent Association, which provided job and housing assistance, rotating lines of credit, help with naturalization, and support for members during illness and for burial expenses. These institutions became spaces for discussion of Caribbean American life and fostered collective identity among migrants from different islands, contributing to early Pan-Africanist organizing. Female leaders played significant roles, including Elizabeth Hendrickson, co-founder of the American West Indian Ladies' Aid Society and the Harlem Tenants' League.

=== Second wave (post-1965) ===
Beginning in the 1960s, the demographic composition of the area underwent significant change. The Immigration and Nationality Act of 1965, which eliminated national-origin quotas, facilitated a wave of immigration from Caribbean nations including Jamaica, Trinidad and Tobago, Barbados, Grenada, Guyana, Haiti, and Panama. Many new immigrants settled in Flatbush and East Flatbush during the late 1960s and 1970s, drawn by the availability of affordable housing as white residents relocated to the suburbs in a process sometimes described as white flight. Sociologist Roy Bryce-Laporte characterized this period as "the new Caribbean immigration," noting the distinctive patterns of settlement in New York City. Caribbean immigrants established ethnic enclaves, transforming commercial corridors with restaurants, bakeries, markets, churches, and cultural institutions that catered to their communities.

By the 1970s and 1980s, the Caribbean community had established a substantial presence in central Brooklyn. Caribbean immigrants in New York reached half a million by the late 1980s, and the core of the community shifted during the 1970s from Harlem and Bedford-Stuyvesant to central Brooklyn. By 1980, over half of New York's West Indian population, and almost one-fourth of the nation's, lived in Brooklyn. Political scientist Philip Kasinitz documented how West Indian immigrants in Brooklyn navigated questions of racial solidarity and ethnic distinctiveness, forming a community that was both part of and distinct from African American Brooklyn. The population of the neighborhood shifted significantly, with Afro-Caribbean immigrants and African Americans comprising an increasing share of residents.

== Demographics ==
Little Caribbean is home to one of the largest concentrations of Caribbean-descended people outside of the West Indies. According to the Migration Policy Institute, more than half of Barbadian, Guyanese, Haitian, Jamaican, and Trinidadian immigrants in the United States have settled in New York, especially Brooklyn and Queens. For over 100 years, Caribbean immigrants have been settling in Brooklyn, making the borough home to one of the largest and most diverse communities of Caribbean people in the world.

The NYC Mayor's Office of Immigrant Affairs' 2024 Annual Report noted that the Caribbean remains a significant source of immigration to New York City. Non-Hispanic Caribbean immigrants historically have had the highest naturalization rate among all immigrant groups in New York City. According to the NYC Department of City Planning's 2013 report "The Newest New Yorkers," 62.9 percent of non-Hispanic Caribbean immigrants held U.S. citizenship, and the report noted that "Jamaican, Haitian, and other non-Hispanic Caribbean immigrants settled primarily in central Brooklyn."

== Culture ==
Little Caribbean is known for its concentration of Caribbean-owned restaurants, bakeries, and markets. Establishments serve cuisine from across the Caribbean, including Jamaican jerk chicken, Trinidadian roti, Haitian griot and pikliz, Guyanese pepperpot, Barbadian cou-cou, and other traditional dishes. The commercial corridors also feature music shops, hair salons, dollar vans providing informal transit service, and stores selling Caribbean imports.

=== Music and arts ===
The neighborhood has strong connections to Caribbean musical traditions. Drummer's Grove in Prospect Park hosts a weekly gathering of drummers performing African and Caribbean rhythms on Sundays between April and October, continuing a tradition that dates back approximately 50 years. The tradition pays homage to African ancestors who brought their musical traditions to the West Indies in the 17th century.

Street art and murals throughout the neighborhood celebrate Caribbean culture. At the Church Avenue station on the IRT Nostrand Avenue Line, artist Louis Delsarte's 2001 installation "Transitions" features stained glass and glass mosaic murals depicting cultural scenes from the neighborhood, including participants in the West Indian American Day Parade.

The artist Jean-Michel Basquiat, whose father was born in Haiti and whose mother was of Puerto Rican descent, was born in Brooklyn in 1960 and lived on East 35th Street in East Flatbush during his childhood.

==== West Indian Day Parade ====
Little Caribbean is closely associated with the West Indian Day Parade, held annually on Labor Day on Eastern Parkway in nearby Crown Heights. Organized by the West Indian American Day Carnival Association, the parade is one of New York City's largest annual events, drawing between one and three million participants and spectators. The parade traces its origins to carnival celebrations organized by Trinidadian immigrant Jessie Waddell in Harlem in the 1920s and moved to Brooklyn in 1969.

== Landmarks ==
The Historic Districts Council's Six to Celebrate cultural survey identified several long-standing businesses and cultural sites as significant to Little Caribbean's heritage.

Allan's Bakery in Prospect Lefferts Gardens is one of the longest-standing Caribbean businesses in Little Caribbean, serving Caribbean and West Indian products since 1961. Founded by Allan Smith, a native of St. Vincent, and his wife Gloria, who grew up in Panama, the bakery is known for its currant rolls, hard dough bread, coconut bakes, and cassava pone. The African Record Centre on Nostrand Avenue has been a neighborhood institution since 1969. The store specializes in Afrobeat, Zouk, and Calypso records, along with Caribbean crafts including handwoven baskets, sculptures, masks, and instruments. It remains one of the oldest continuously operating Caribbean cultural businesses in the neighborhood.

Scoops, opened in 1984 by Trinidadian Tony Fongyit, is an ice cream parlor and vegetarian restaurant on Flatbush Avenue. The menu reflects Fongyit's adherence to Rastafarianism and an Ital diet emphasizing natural foods. Labay Market is owned by a man known as "Mack," who imports produce from a 60-acre farm he owns in Grenada, including breadfruit, jackfruit, callaloo, and hard-to-find items such as dasheen bush (taro leaves) and eddoe root. Labay is also known for its fresh coconut water. Conrad's Famous Bakery was founded in 1981 by Conrad Ifill, who was born in Trinidad and Tobago. Ifill died in 2019 during the COVID-19 pandemic.

=== Street co-namings ===
Several streets in Little Caribbean have been co-named to honor Caribbean figures.

In 2006, a section of Church Avenue from Remsen Avenue to East 98th Street in Little Caribbean was co-named Bob Marley Boulevard in honor of the Jamaican reggae musician. The designation was championed by then-City Councilwoman Yvette D. Clarke and extended to the intersection of Church and Nostrand Avenues in 2009, coinciding with what would have been Marley's 64th birthday.

Jean-Jacques Dessalines Boulevard and Toussaint L'Ouverture Boulevard, honoring Haitian revolutionary leaders, were designated in 2018 on Newkirk Avenue at Rogers Avenue and Nostrand Avenue at Newkirk Avenue, respectively. Dr. Lamuel A. Stanislaus Way, named for the Grenadian dentist and diplomat who helped establish the West Indian Day Parade, was designated in 2019 at Flatbush Avenue and Rutland Road. Dr. Roy A. Hastick Sr. Way, honoring the founder of the Caribbean American Chamber of Commerce and Industry, was designated in 2021 at Caton Avenue and Flatbush Avenue.

In 2021, the Newkirk Avenue subway station on the 2 and 5 trains was renamed Newkirk Avenue–Little Haiti in recognition of the neighborhood's Haitian community.

== Recognition and preservation ==
In 2022, the Historic Districts Council named Little Caribbean one of its "Six to Celebrate" neighborhoods, highlighting its cultural and historical significance. Pratt Institute's Graduate Center for Planning and the Environment has partnered with the Historic Districts Council and caribBEING to conduct a cultural survey of the neighborhood as part of an effort to document culturally significant sites. In 2024, I AM caribBEING received an Excellence in Historic Preservation Award from the Preservation League of New York State for its work sustaining and promoting Little Caribbean. In September 2024, Time Out magazine named Flatbush the coolest neighborhood in New York City and the "17th coolest in the world", citing its Black-owned businesses, cultural vibrancy, and proximity to Prospect Park.

=== Official designation ===
The effort to officially designate the neighborhood as Little Caribbean was initiated by Shelley Worrell, a Flatbush native of Trinidadian descent and founder of I AM caribBEING, a cultural organization established in 2010 to promote Caribbean culture, community, and commerce in Brooklyn. Worrell began advocating for the designation around 2015, viewing it as an opportunity to support existing Caribbean-owned businesses and position the area as a cultural destination.

The designation campaign received support from the Office of the Brooklyn Borough President, the Caribbean Tourism Organization, and local elected officials including then-City Councilman Jumaane Williams and Assemblymember Rodneyse Bichotte. On September 28, 2017, following the 50th annual West Indian American Day Parade, the neighborhood was officially designated as Little Caribbean. Borough President Eric Adams, who participated in the designation ceremony, stated that "Brooklyn is the epicenter of the Caribbean Diaspora, and this branding promises to have an incalculable value on the economic development and cultural pride of Flatbush and East Flatbush."

The designation of Little Caribbean was followed in 2018 by the creation of the adjacent Little Haiti Cultural and Business District, encompassing parts of Ditmas Park, Flatbush, East Flatbush, and Midwood, recognizing the substantial Haitian population in the area.

=== Gentrification ===
Like many historically Black neighborhoods in Brooklyn, Little Caribbean faces pressures from gentrification and rising housing costs. Brooklyn's Black population declined by nearly 70,000 between 2010 and 2020. Scholars have examined how displacement has affected the area's long-standing Caribbean community and the ways residents have organized to preserve their neighborhood. Community organizations such as Equality for Flatbush have organized around issues of housing affordability and displacement, advocating for the preservation of the neighborhood's Caribbean character.

== See also ==
- Little Haiti, Brooklyn
- East Flatbush, Brooklyn
- Caribbean immigration to New York City
