= East Flatbush, Brooklyn =

Neighborhood in New York City

East Flatbush
- Neighborhood of Brooklyn
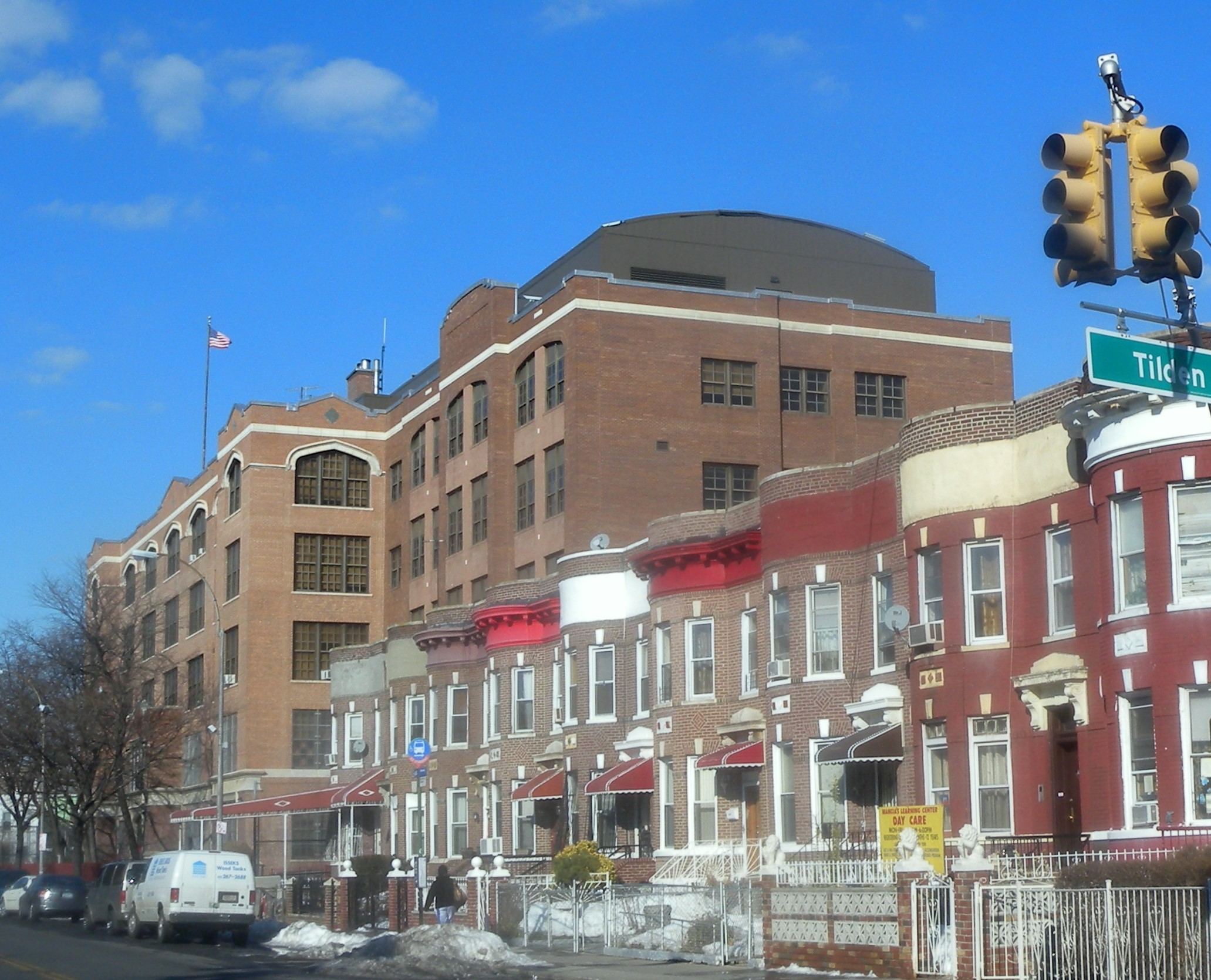
- PS 181, Tilden and New York Avenues
- Location in New York City
- Coordinates: 40.644°N 73.930°W
- Country: United States
- State: New York
- City: New York City
- Borough: Brooklyn
- Community District: Brooklyn 17

Area
  - Total: 7.5737 km^{2} (2.9242 sq mi)

Population (2010)
  - Total: 135,619
  - Density: 17,907/km^{2} (46,378/sq mi)

Ethnicity
  - Black: 88.7%
  - Hispanic: 6.6
  - Two or more races: 1.6
  - White: 1.3
  - Other: 1.8
- Time zone: UTC−5 (Eastern)
  - Summer (DST): UTC−4 (EDT)
- ZIP Code: 11203
- Area codes: 718, 347, 929, and 917

East Flatbush is a residential neighborhood in the New York City borough of Brooklyn. East Flatbush is bounded by Crown Heights and Empire Boulevard to the north; Brownsville and East 98th Street to the east; Flatlands, Canarsie and the Long Island Rail Road's Bay Ridge Branch to the south; and the neighborhood of Flatbush and New York Avenue to the west. East Flatbush is a predominantly black neighborhood of African American and Afro-Caribbean persons and has a population of 135,619 as of the 2010 United States census.

East Flatbush is part of Brooklyn Community District 17, and its primary ZIP Code is 11203. It is patrolled by the 67th Precinct of the New York City Police Department. Politically it is represented by the New York City Council's 40th, 41st, and 45th Districts.

== Geography ==
As with many neighborhoods in Brooklyn, the borders of East Flatbush are subjective/porous, but its northern border is roughly at Empire Boulevard and East New York Avenue east of East 91st Street, its southern border is in the vicinity of the Long Island Rail Road Bay Ridge Branch, its eastern border is roughly at East 98th Street and its western border is roughly at New York/Brooklyn Avenues.

East Flatbush is split up into three subsections. From west to east they are Erasmus, Farragut, and Remsen Village/Rugby.

=== Farragut ===
The central section of East Flatbush is called Farragut. Farragut is roughly bounded by Cortelyou Road and Holy Cross Cemetery to the north, Kings Highway to the east, Brooklyn Avenue on the west, and the LIRR Bay Ridge Branch to the south. Farragut was originally part of the colonial Town of Flatbush, and was named for American Civil War Admiral David Farragut. The area was largely populated by Jews and Italians before 1950. By the 1990s, African Americans became a majority, along with many immigrants from the West Indies.

Farragut is adjacent to Paerdegat Woods, a formerly wooded area near Paerdegat Basin where real-estate developer Fred Trump constructed housing in the 1940s. Farragut also contains Flatbush Gardens (formerly named Vanderveer Estates), a 59-building complex erected in 1949. Vanderveer Estates was built on the site of the old Flatbush Water Works. The complex is one of the largest privately held working-class housing complexes in New York City, and owned in part by David Bistricer. Notable people who once lived in Vanderveer Estates include Barbra Streisand and Michael K. Williams.

=== Remsen Village ===
Remsen Village has been described as a "subsection of the larger East Flatbush neighborhood," with an estimated 60,000 residents. but is also sometimes considered its own neighborhood and also as "Rugby-Remsen Village". The origin of using the name Remsen Village seems to be in the mid-1990s. Remsen Village's population is over one third of that of Brooklyn Community Board 17, which consists entirely of East Flatbush and its subsections.

The name "Rugby" was described in 2016 by The New York Times as "the old name for the area." It persists as the name of a road in East Flatbush, as well as a library branch in eastern East Flatbush. The name "Rugby" was chosen by developers in the 1890s.

== Demographics ==
East Flatbush is divided into three neighborhood tabulation areas (Erasmus, Farragut, and Remsen Village), which collectively comprise the population of the area. Based on data from the 2010 United States census, the combined population of East Flatbush's neighborhood tabulation areas was 135,619, a change of −9,740 (−7.2%) from the 145,359 counted in 2000. Covering an area of 1,871.5 acres (757.4 ha), the neighborhood had a population density of 72.5 inhabitants per acre (46,400/sq mi; 17,900/km^{2}).

The racial makeup of the neighborhood was 1.3% (1,816) White, 88.7% (120,231) African American, 0.3% (366) Native American, 1.1% (1,480) Asian, 0% (45) Pacific Islander, 0.4% (523) from other races, and 1.6% (2,140) from two or more races. Hispanic or Latino of any race were 6.6% (9,018) of the population.

The entirety of Community Board 17 had 154,575 inhabitants as of NYC Health's 2018 Community Health Profile, with an average life expectancy of 82.6 years. This is higher than the median life expectancy of 81.2 for all New York City neighborhoods. Most inhabitants are middle-aged adults and youth: 21% are between the ages of 0 and 17, 28% between 25 and 44, and 28% between 45 and 64. The ratio of college-aged and elderly residents was lower, at 9% and 15%, respectively.

As of 2016, the median household income in Community District 17 was $49,349. In 2018, an estimated 19% of East Flatbush residents lived in poverty, compared to 21% in all of Brooklyn and 20% in all of New York City. One in eleven residents (9%) were unemployed, compared to 9% in the rest of both Brooklyn and New York City. Rent burden, or the percentage of residents who have difficulty paying their rent, is 54% in East Flatbush, higher than the citywide and boroughwide rates of 52% and 51%, respectively. Based on this calculation, as of 2018, East Flatbush is considered to be high-income and not gentrifying, relative to the rest of the city.

=== Ethnic groups and subsections ===
East Flatbush generally is very similar in nature to neighboring Flatbush, as both are predominantly West Indian and working class; however, Flatbush has a higher percentage of White and Asian residents than East Flatbush. The area was populated after World War II predominantly by immigrant Jews and Italians, then in the 1960s by African Americans, but most recently has seen many West Indian immigrants such as Guyanese, Haitians, Jamaicans, Saint Lucians, Trinidadians, Grenadians, Vincentians, Bajans, Panamanians and Dominicans groups coming to the area. Within its confines is the Holy Cross Cemetery, Brooklyn, which is located at 3620 Tilden Avenue. While some residents are affluent, East Flatbush is mostly populated by working and middle-class Brooklynites. Similar to other eastern Brooklyn neighborhoods, Blacks predominate East Flatbush. The area is 91.4% Black or African-American and 51% foreign born, the majority of whom are from the Caribbean. Considering this data, East Flatbush has been noted as being the single largest West Indian neighborhood in all of New York City and America as a whole.

According to the 2020 census data from New York City Department of City Planning, East Flatbush has been given three different names for three different sections, which are East Flatbush Erasmus to the west, East Flatbush Farragut to the east, and East Flatbush Rugby to the north. The Erasmus portion had between 30,000 and 39,999 Black residents and between 5,000 and 9,999 Hispanic residents, meanwhile each the White and Asian populations were fewer than 5,000 residents. The Rugby portion had 30,000 to 39,999 Black residents while each the Hispanic, White, and Asian populations were all fewer than 5,000 residents. The Farragut portion had 20,000 to 29,999 Black residents while each the Hispanic, White, and Asian population were also all fewer than 5,000 residents.

=== Little Caribbean and Little Haiti ===
Since the 1960s and especially through the 1970s, Caribbean immigrants have largely settled into East Flatbush, as well as in other surrounding areas such as Flatbush and Crown Heights. Since 2017, the areas surrounding Nostrand and Church Avenues have been given the nickname Little Caribbean. In addition to Little Caribbean, the south tip of the neighborhood has been given the name Little Haiti due to the high concentration of Haitians. Additionally, the Newkirk Avenue–Little Haiti station of the New York City Subway's 2 and 5 trains was formally renamed from Newkirk Avenue in 2021.

== Police and crime ==
The NYPD's 67th Precinct (known internally by NYPD officers as Fort Jah) is located at 2820 Snyder Avenue. The 67th Precinct ranked 40th safest out of 69 patrol areas for per-capita crime in 2010. As of 2018, with a non-fatal assault rate of 80 per 100,000 people, East Flatbush's rate of violent crimes per capita is greater than that of the city as a whole. The incarceration rate of 597 per 100,000 people is higher than that of the city as a whole. The Precinct has a lower crime rate than in the 1990s, with crimes across all categories having decreased by 79.9% between 1990 and 2018. The precinct reported 6 murders, 43 rapes, 246 robberies, 601 felony assaults, 225 burglaries, 586 grand larcenies, and 98 grand larcenies auto in 2018.

A drug epidemic ravaged East Flatbush during the late 1970s, 1980s and early 1990s, mostly in Vanderveer Estates. The intersection of Foster Avenue and Nostrand Avenues was nicknamed "the Front Page" because of media attention to drug murders there. The intersection of Foster between New York Avenue and Brooklyn Avenue area to the south was called "the Back Page" because its many murders went unnoticed. The area around the Nostrand playground had various gangs: Crips, Gangster Disciples, Jamaicans (Shower Posse), Trinidadians and Grenadians particularly notorious for turf wars, shootouts, and pitbull fights. Crime is still somewhat of a problem in the neighborhood today as well.

== Fire safety ==
The firehouse for the New York City Fire Department (FDNY)'s Engine Co. 310/Ladder Co. 174 is located at 5105 Snyder Avenue.

== Health ==
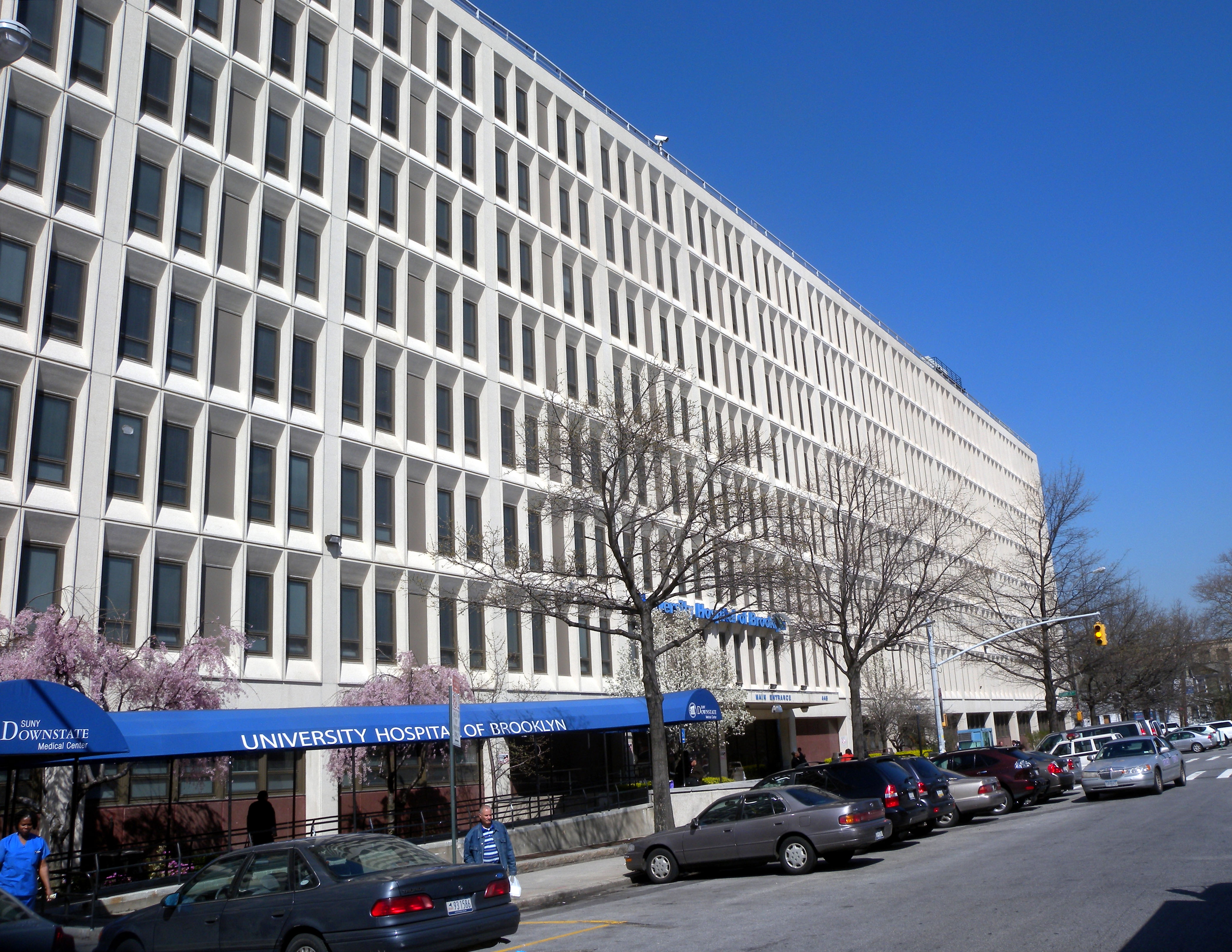
SUNY Downstate Medical Center

As of 2018, preterm births and births to teenage mothers are more common in East Flatbush than in other places citywide. In East Flatbush, there were 126 preterm births per 1,000 live births (compared to 87 per 1,000 citywide), and 20.6 births to teenage mothers per 1,000 live births (compared to 19.3 per 1,000 citywide). East Flatbush has a high population of residents who are uninsured, or who receive healthcare through Medicaid. In 2018, this population of uninsured residents was estimated to be 15%, which is higher than the citywide rate of 12%.

The concentration of fine particulate matter, the deadliest type of air pollutant, in East Flatbush is 0.0078 milligrams per cubic metre (7.8×10^{−9} oz/ft^{3}), lower than the citywide and boroughwide averages. Eight percent of East Flatbush residents are smokers, which is lower the city average of 14% of residents being smokers. In East Flatbush, 34% of residents are obese, 15% are diabetic, and 36% have high blood pressure—compared to the citywide averages of 24%, 11%, and 28%, respectively. In addition, 22% of children are obese, compared to the citywide average of 20%.

Eighty percent of residents eat some fruits and vegetables every day, which is lower than the city's average of 87%. In 2018, 83% of residents described their health as "good", "very good", or "excellent", higher than the city's average of 78%. For every supermarket in East Flatbush, there are 21 bodegas.

East Flatbush is home to three major hospitals, Kings County Hospital, SUNY Downstate Medical Center, and Kingsbrook Jewish Medical Center.

== Transportation ==
East Flatbush does not have as much access to the New York City Subway as Flatbush. However, the IRT Nostrand Avenue Line (2 and 5 trains) has some stops located near the western border of East Flatbush, particularly Newkirk Avenue–Little Haiti, Beverly Road, and Church Avenue. Additionally, along the neighborhood's eastern border with Brownsville, the IRT New Lots Line (2, 3, 4, and 5 trains) has a station at the intersection of Sutter Avenue, Rutland Road, and East 98th Street.

MTA Regional Bus Operations' B44, B44 SBS, B46 and B46 SBS routes run north–south through East Flatbush, while the B6, B8 and B35 run east–west. The B12 bus takes a serpentine route at the north end of the neighborhood as well as the B43, and the B7 runs on Kings Highway at the southeast edge of East Flatbush. The B6 runs via Bay Pkwy, Avenue J, and Flatlands Av and although passing through several neighborhoods, makes a few stops in East Flatbush. The B103 and BM2 also makes a few stops in the area on Avenue H, by the border with Flatlands.

== Education ==
East Flatbush generally has a lower ratio of college-educated residents than the rest of the city as of 2018. While 30% of residents age 25 and older have a college education or higher, 15% have less than a high school education and 55% are high school graduates or have some college education. By contrast, 40% of Brooklynites and 38% of city residents have a college education or higher. The percentage of East Flatbush students excelling in math has been increasing, with math achievement rising from 32 percent in 2000 to 51 percent in 2011, though reading achievement within the same time period stayed steady at 42%.

East Flatbush's rate of elementary school student absenteeism is slightly higher than the rest of New York City. In East Flatbush, 23% of elementary school students missed twenty or more days per school year, compared to the citywide average of 20% of students. Additionally, 78% of high school students in East Flatbush graduate on time, higher than the citywide average of 75% of students.

=== Schools ===
Schools located in East Flatbush include:

- Cristo Rey High School, a Catholic college preparatory high school located at East 37 Street and Foster Avenue
- Cultural Academy for the Arts and Sciences (CAAS)
- Kurt Hahn Expeditionary Learning School
- It Takes A Village Academy (ITAVA)
- Nazareth Regional High School, a co-educational private Catholic high school located at East 57th Street and Avenue D
- St. Francis of Assisi School
- The School for Human Rights
- The School for Democracy and Leadership
- High School for Public Service: Heroes of Tomorrow
- P.S. 208K (Elsa Ebeling School), a public elementary school, located at East 48th Street and Avenue D
- St. Catherine of Genoa/St. Therese of Lisieux Catholic Academy
- Meyer Levin Junior High School
- SUNY Downstate Medical Center
- PS 135 Sheldon A Brookner
- Phyl's Academy

The neighborhood was the home of the former General George W. Wingate and Gov. Samuel J. Tilden High Schools.

=== Libraries ===
The Brooklyn Public Library (BPL) has two branches in East Flatbush. The Rugby branch is located at 1000 Utica Avenue and opened in 1957. It was closed for renovations in 2017 and reopened in 2021.

The East Flatbush Library is located at 9612 Church Avenue, between East 96th Street and Rockaway Parkway, and was opened in 1945. In September 2018, this library was also closed for renovations; it reopened in June 2023.

== Notable places ==
In summer 2006, the New York City Department of Transportation co-named a portion of Church Avenue from Remsen Avenue to East 98th Street in East Flatbush as "Bob Marley Boulevard".

The former Congregation Beth Israel, now known as Mt. Zion Church of God 7th Day, was listed on the National Register of Historic Places in 2009.

In addition, the neighborhood has a 74,000-square-foot (6,900 m^{2}) recreation center, Shirley Chisholm Recreation Center, which opened in 2026.

== Notable people ==
Notable current and former residents of East Flatbush include:

- Roosevelt Chapman (born 1962), basketball player
- Edwidge Danticat (born 1969), writer
- Flatbush Zombies, hip-hop group
- Fu-Schnickens, hip-hop group
- Rudy Giuliani (born 1944), former mayor of New York City
- Ira Glasser (born 1938), civil liberties defender and author
- Jamie Hector (born 1975), actor
- Jidenna (born 1985), "Wondaland Records" rapper/singer
- Joey Badass (born 1995), rapper
- Ivan Lee (born 1981), Olympic saber fencer
- MC Lyte (born 1970), rapper
- Romona Moore, murdered college student
- James P. O'Neill (born 1958), NYC Police Commissioner
- Rowdy Rebel (born 1991), rapper
- Busta Rhymes (born 1972), rapper
- Bobby Shmurda (born 1994), rapper
- Shyne (born 1978 as Jamal Michael Barrow), rapper and politician
- Barbra Streisand (born 1942), singer and actress
- The Underachievers, rappers
- Frankie Light (born 1994), Polyglot and Entrepreneur
- Unlocking the Truth, heavy metal group
- Michael K. Williams (born 1966), actor
