= Church Avenue station =

Church Avenue station may refer to:

- Church Avenue station (BMT Brighton Line), a subway station near East 18th Street in Brooklyn
- Church Avenue station (IND Culver Line), a subway station at McDonald Avenue in Brooklyn
- Church Avenue station (IRT Nostrand Avenue Line), a subway station at Nostrand Avenues in Brooklyn
