= Church Avenue Line =

Church Avenue Line may refer to the following transit lines in Brooklyn, New York:

- Church Avenue Line (surface) (bus, formerly streetcar), a public transit line running mainly along 39th Street and Church Avenue between Sunset Park and Brownsville
- Church Avenue Line, one of several names for IND Church Avenue Line's subway portion, running south from Jay Street to Church Avenue
