= St. Blaise's Church (Brooklyn) =

Coordinates: 40.661°N 73.950°W

The Church of St. Blaise
- Interactive map of the The Church of St. Blaise area

General information
- Location: East Flatbush, Brooklyn, New York City, New York, United States of America
- Completed: 1908
- Client: Roman Catholic Archdiocese of New York

The Church of St. Blaise is a former Roman Catholic parish church in the Diocese of Brooklyn, located at East Flatbush, Brooklyn, New York City, New York.

== Description ==
The parish was established in 1905 out of the Holy Cross parish for the burgeoning Italian community, who had—since 1897—been administered to by Father Ludeke and Father Malone. The parish was merged with that of St. Francis of Assisi's Church (Brooklyn, New York), which had been established in 1898, to form the parish of St. Francis of Assisi / St. Blaise. The combined parish is located at 319 Maple Street, Brooklyn, New York 11225, the premises of the Church of St. Francis of Assisi. Effective January 31, 2011, the merged parish of St. Francis of Assisi - St. Blaise absorbed the territorial boundaries of the former Parish of Saint Ignatius, wherein "all the assets and obligations [including the parochial registers and the seals] currently belonging to the former Parish of Saint Ignatius are by this canonical decree transferred to the Parish of Saint Francis of Assisi – Saint Blaise." The Church of Saint Ignatius remains open as a chapel of ease within the merged parish.

== Buildings ==
The St. Blaise's Church building was dedicated October 18, 1908, and the Rev. Joseph Bonaventure was given charge until the appointment of a pastor. The first pastor was Rev. Vincent A. Di Giovanni; he was appointed June 20, 1911.

== Pastors ==
- Rev. [Francis] Ludeke of Holy Cross Church (1897-1898)
- Rev. Malone of Holy Cross Church (1898-1905)
- Rev. Joseph Bonaventure, temporary pastor, (1905-?)
- Rev. Simonetti, temporary pastor, (?-June 20, 1911)
- Rev. Vincent A. Di Giovanni, first official pastor, (June 20, 1911-?)
