= Beverley Road (disambiguation) =

Beverley Road may refer to:

- Beverley Road, a major road that runs out of Hull in the East Riding of Yorkshire, England

== New York City Subway ==
- Beverley Road (BMT Brighton Line), serving the Q train
- Beverly Road (IRT Nostrand Avenue Line), misspelled, serving the 2 and 5 trains
