= B70 (New York City bus) =

Bus line in Brooklyn, New York City

b70
- Eighth Avenue Line
- 2011 New Flyer Industries C40LF CNG (278) on the B70 to VA Hospital at 8th Avenue & 58th Street in April 2026

Overview
- System: MTA Regional Bus Operations
- Operator: New York City Transit Authority
- Garage: Jackie Gleason Depot
- Vehicle: New Flyer C40LF CNG; New Flyer Xcelsior XN40
- Began service: December 1, 1916 (streetcar); May 15, 1949 (bus)
- Ended service: May 15, 1949 (streetcar)

Route
- Locale: Brooklyn, New York, U.S.
- Start: Sunset Park – 3rd Avenue and 39th Street
- Via: 39th Street, 8th Avenue, Fort Hamilton Parkway
- End: Dyker Heights – V.A. Medical Center
- Length: 4.9 miles (7.9 km)

Service
- Operates: All times except late nights
- Annual patronage: 1,606,346 (2025)
- Transfers: Yes
- Timetable: B70

The B70 bus route is a public transit line in Brooklyn in New York City, running mostly on 8th Avenue and 39th Street between Sunset Park and Dyker Heights. The route was originally a streetcar line known as the Eighth Avenue Line, and is currently operated by MTA New York City Bus.

== Route description ==
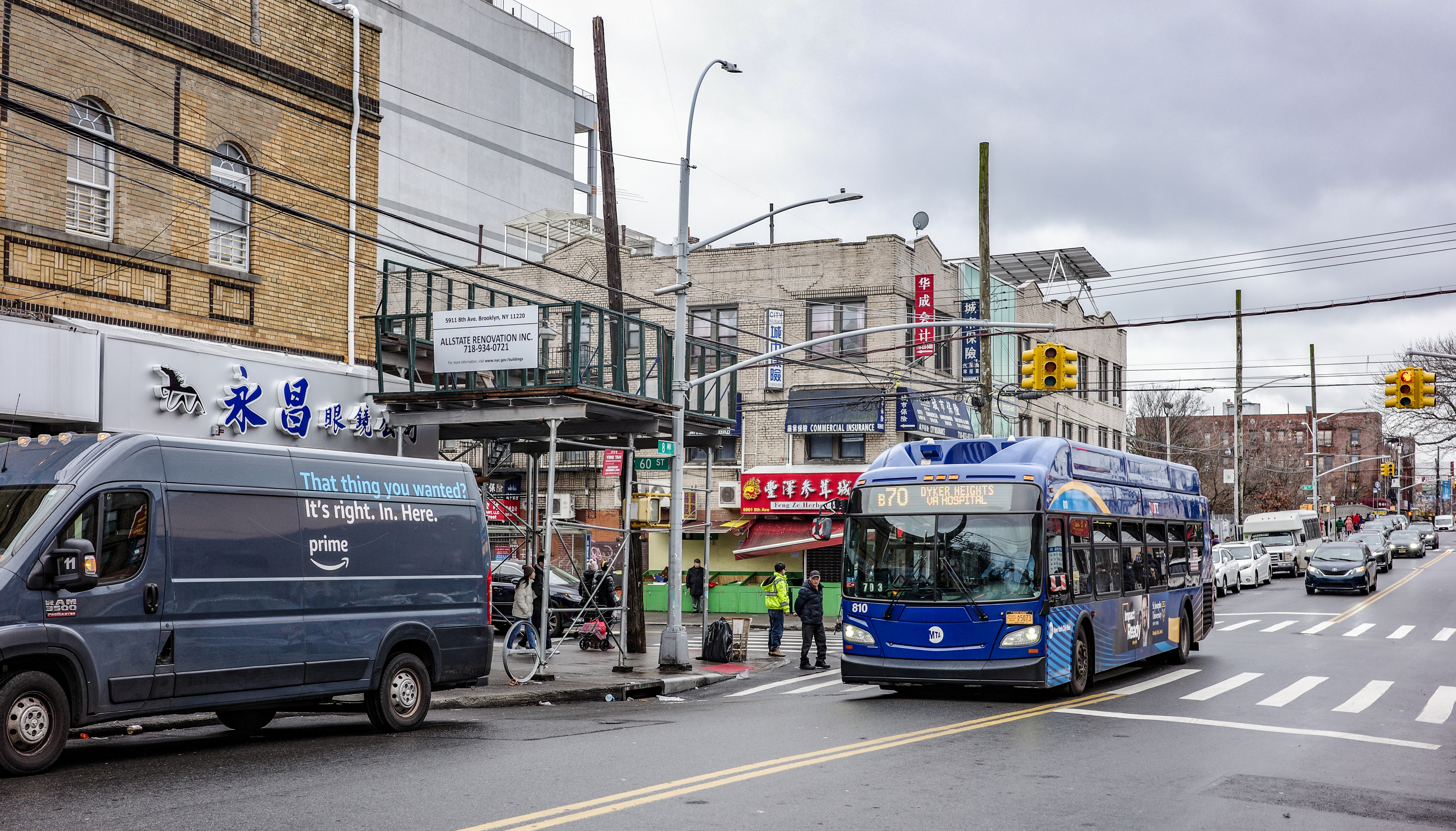
A 2017 XN40 (810) on the Dyker Heights-bound B70 at 8th Avenue/60th Street

=== Towards Dyker Heights ===
It begins at 2nd Avenue and 37th Street, similar to the B35 bus. It then turns right at 37th Street. Afterwards, it makes another right onto 4th Avenue and left at 39th Street. It continues until it turns right at 8th Avenue. It travels on 8th Avenue down the whole way. It then turns right onto 70th Street / Ovington Avenue and then makes a left on 7th Avenue. It goes the whole length, merging with Fort Hamilton Parkway at 79th Street, before making a left onto 92nd Street. It then turns onto 7th Avenue, following Poly Place to the VA Hospital, where it ends.

=== Towards 3rd Avenue & 39th Street ===
It begins at VA Hospital at Bay 3. It follows Poly Place & 7th Avenue, then makes a left onto 92nd Street. From there, it turns right at Fort Hamilton Parkway, following the eastern portion. It then makes a left on Bay Ridge Parkway, then right onto 7th Avenue briefly before merging onto 8th Avenue. It continues down 8th Avenue, then turns left at 39th Street. It then turns right at 4th Avenue, then left at 36th Street until 3rd Avenue. It then turns left at Third Avenue and then turns right back onto 39th Street, terminating at the 39th Street & 3rd Avenue stop, the same terminus as the B35 bus. Buses do not keep passengers on the stretch back to the starting point on 2nd Avenue.

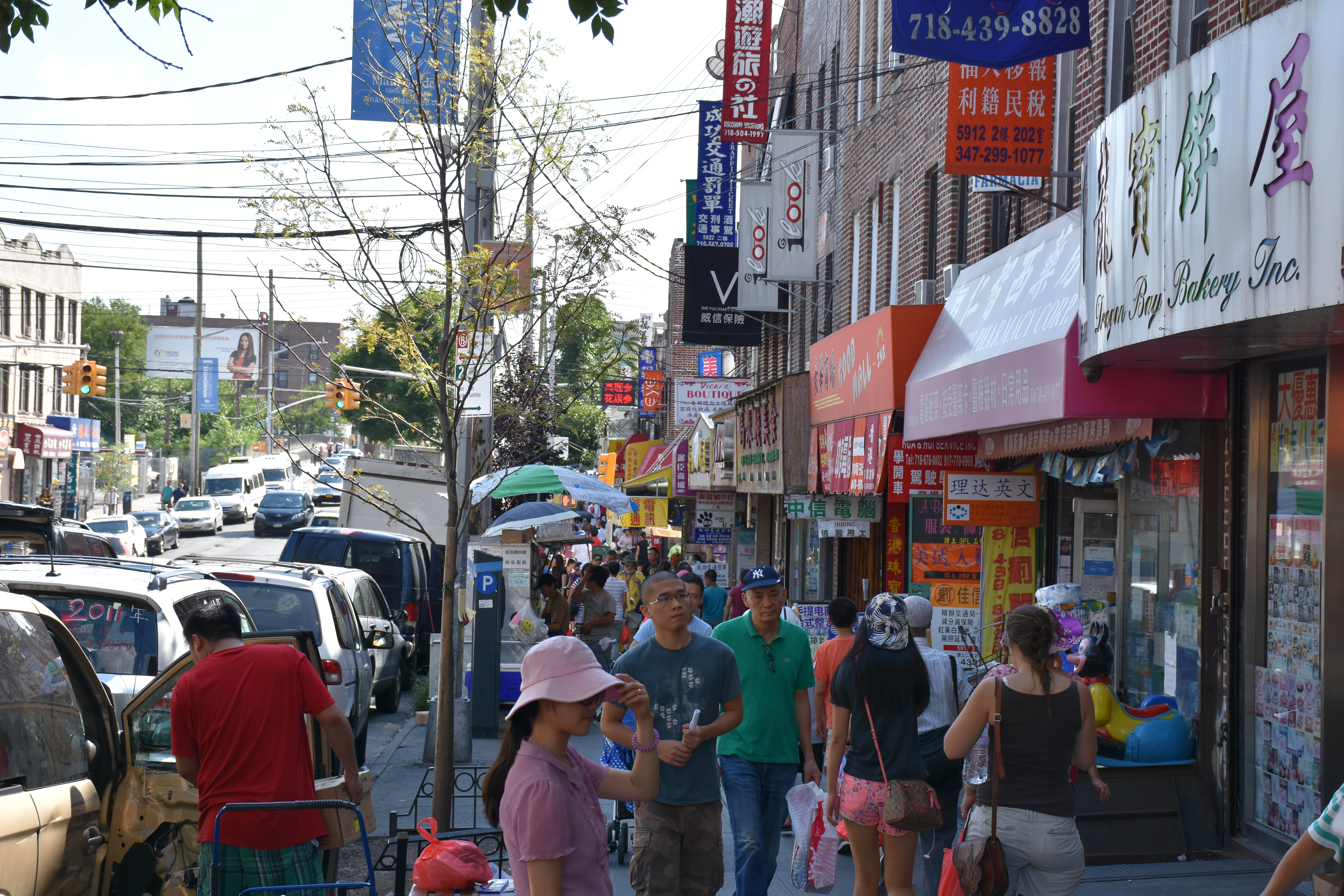
Past the Chinese businesses at 57th Street is a B70 Sunset Park bus stop hidden in this photo, located at 8th Avenue/62nd Street

== History ==
The Eighth Avenue streetcar line was built and opened on December 1, 1916. It was the last streetcar line built in Brooklyn. It ran on Eighth Avenue, from its terminus at Bay Ridge Avenue, through what is now Sunset Park. Streetcars continued to run until May 15, 1949, when it was converted to bus operation.

In April 2001, the MTA Board announced that it planned to reroute the B70 to run along 92nd Street and Fort Hamilton Parkway instead of Seventh Avenue and 86th Street in Fort Hamilton. The change would eliminate difficult turns at Fort Hamilton Parkway and 86th Street, and to improve connections with the S53 and S79 bus routes. The change was to be implemented in June 2001.

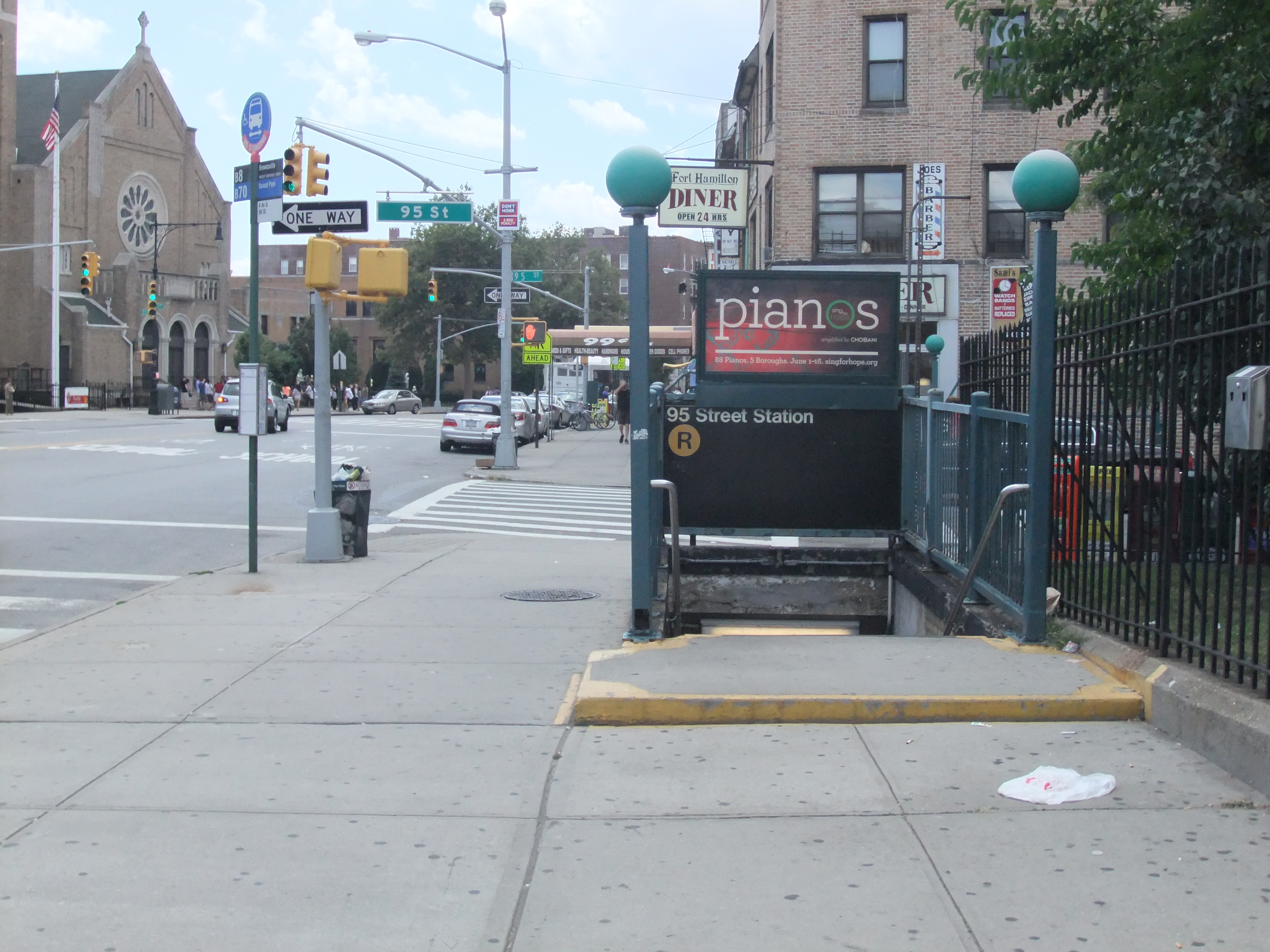
A B8 Brownsville/B70 Sunset Park bus stop at 4th Avenue/95th Street, next to the 95th Street subway station, during the B70's 3rd Avenue era from 2010 to 2014

On June 27, 2010, due to budget cuts, the B37 bus was discontinued and the B70 bus was rerouted from 7th Avenue to 3rd Avenue in Bay Ridge. When the B37 bus was restored on June 29, 2014, the B70 bus was rerouted back from 3rd Avenue to 7th Avenue in Bay Ridge.

On December 1, 2022, the MTA released a draft redesign of the Brooklyn bus network. As part of the redesign, B70 service would be slightly extended to 3rd Avenue and 30th Street at its northern end to serve Industry City. Closely spaced stops would also be eliminated.

Starting from 2023, the B35 and B70 had its terminal changed in Sunset Park due to NYCDEP sewer work. Rather than terminating at 39th Street and 1st Avenue, instead it would make a right onto 2nd Avenue, then terminate and start at 37th Street. However, due to the lot buses used to turn around at Sunset Park being repurposed after NYCDEP work, this became a permanent service pattern, starting January 11, 2026.
