= B35 (New York City bus) =

Bus route in Brooklyn, New York

b35 b35
- Church Avenue Line
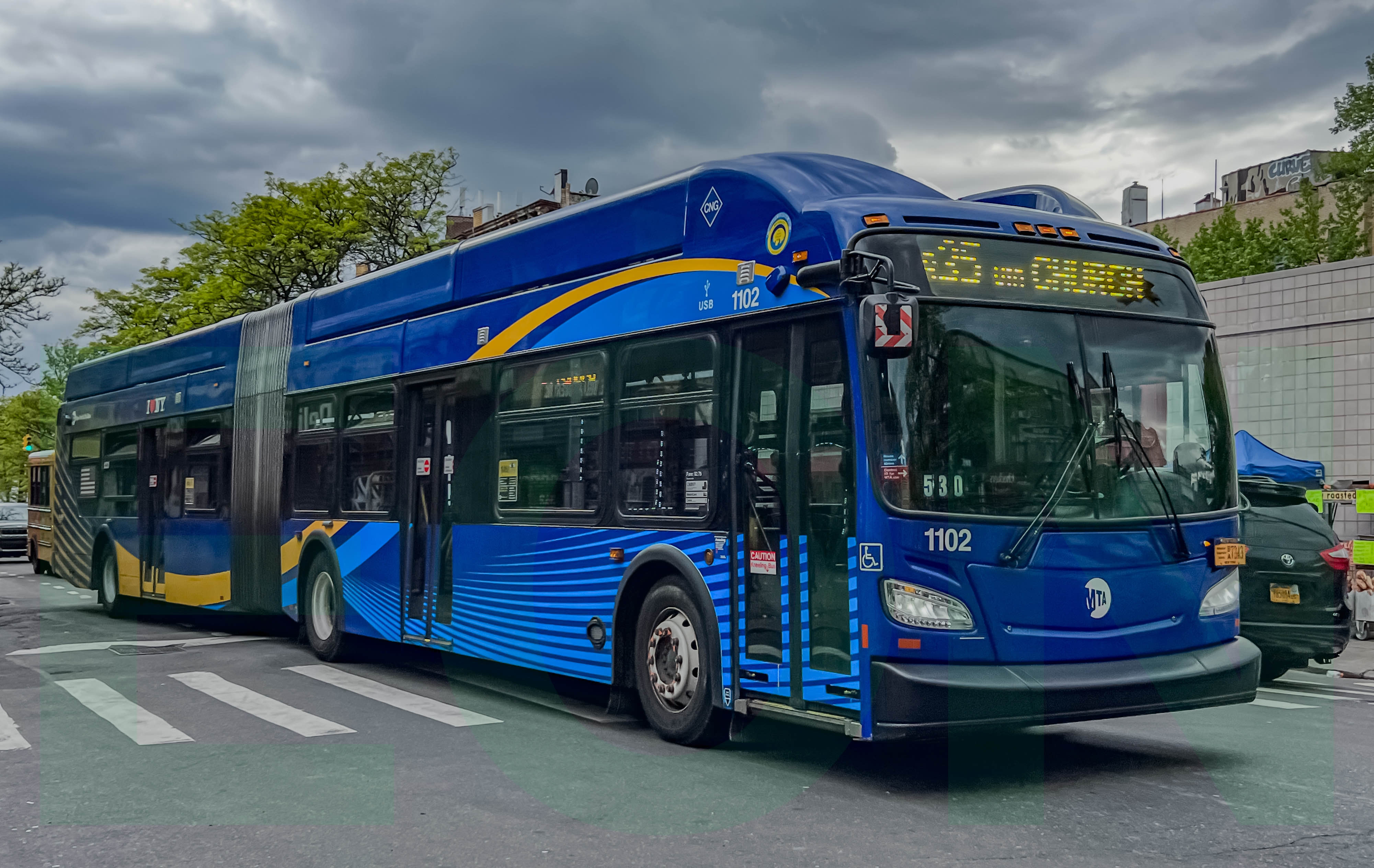
- A 2018 XN60 (1102) on the Brownsville-bound B35 in May 2023

Overview
- System: MTA Regional Bus Operations
- Operator: New York City Transit Authority
- Garage: Jackie Gleason Depot
- Vehicle: New Flyer Xcelsior XN60 (main vehicle); New Flyer C40LF CNG; New Flyer Xcelsior XN40 (supplemental service)
- Began service: 1897 (trolley line); October 30, 1956 (bus service); September 2005 (limited-stop service)

Route
- Locale: Brooklyn, New York, U.S.
- Communities served: Sunset Park, Borough Park, Kensington, Flatbush, East Flatbush, Remsen Village, Brownsville
- Start: Sunset Park – 3rd Avenue and 39th Street
- Via: 39th Street, Church Avenue
- End: Brownsville – Mother Gaston Boulevard
- Length: 6.7 miles (10.8 km) (eastbound)

Service
- Operates: All times
- Annual patronage: 4,247,629 (2025)
- Transfers: Yes
- Timetable: B35

The Church Avenue Line is a public transit line in Brooklyn, New York City, running mainly along 39th Street and Church Avenue between Sunset Park and Brownsville. Originally a streetcar line, it is now the B35 bus route, operated by MTA New York City Bus' Jackie Gleason Depot in Sunset Park.

== Route description ==
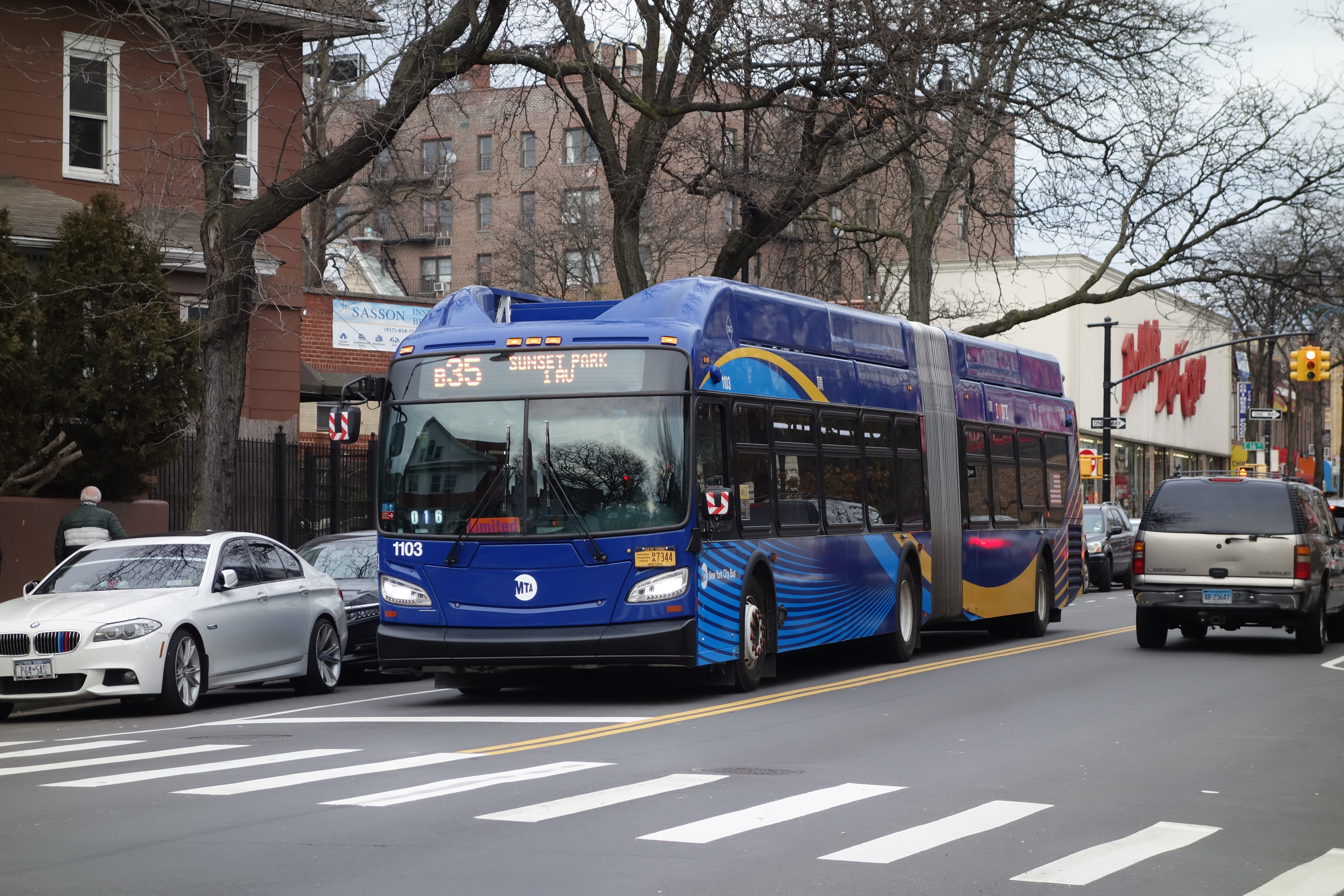
A 2018 XN60 (1103) on the Sunset Park-bound B35 at Church Avenue/Marlborough Road in January 2019

The B35 bus route starts on 2nd Avenue at 37th Street in Sunset Park, near Industry City and the South Brooklyn Marine Terminal. This terminus is shared with the B70. The B35 and B70 then turn right on 37th Street until 4th Avenue, serving the 36th Street (BMT Fourth Avenue Line) station. At 4th Avenue, both routes goes back to 39th Street. The B70 continues east on 39th Street until 8th Avenue. Here, the B70 heads south along 8th Avenue to Dyker Heights while the B35 continues east on 39th Street to 13th Avenue and 14th Avenues, where it switches to Church Avenue. Westbound B35 buses, however, continue on 39th Street, terminating at 3rd Avenue before turning onto 2nd Avenue to the starting point at 37th Street.

Once on Church Avenue, the B35 continues east along that street, serving multiple neighborhoods and interchanges with multiple bus and subway lines along the way. The line continues along the length of Church Avenue until East 98th Street, where buses turn south along East 98th Street and on Hegeman Avenue to the terminal at New Lots Avenue and Mother Gaston Boulevard in Brownsville.

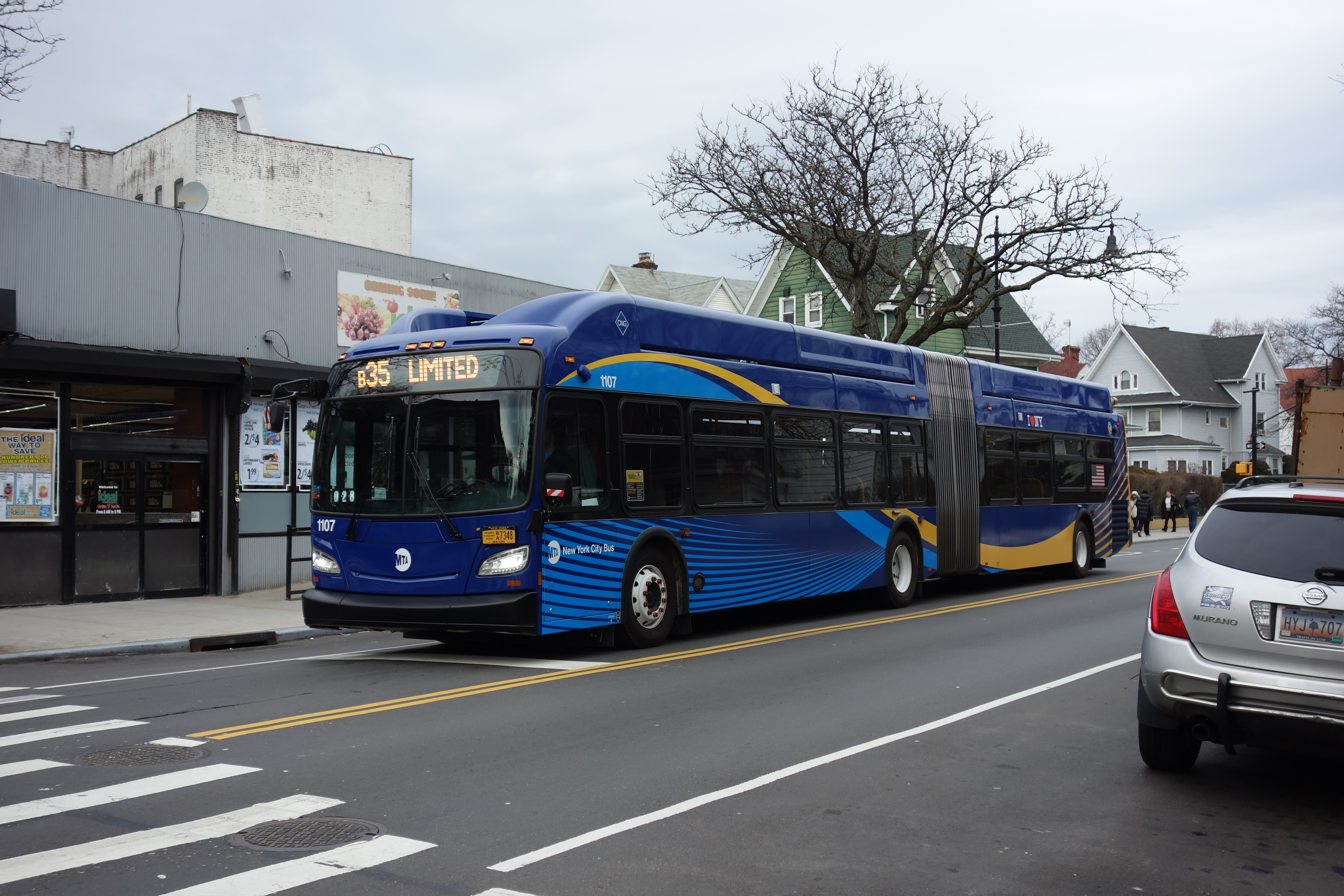
A 2018 XN60 (1107) on the B35 Limited at Church Avenue/Argyle Road in January 2019

The B35 also offers daily Limited-stop service (instituted in September 2005) between McDonald Avenue in Kensington and the route's Brownsville terminus at Mother Gaston Boulevard throughout the day. Limited-stop buses, however, make all stops between 3rd Avenue and McDonald Avenue, and local service east of McDonald Avenue is provided by B35 local buses which only go to McDonald Avenue while Limited-stop service is running. Some local trips from McDonald Avenue short-turn at Kings Highway. During PM rush hours, some local trips to Kings Highway originate at the Church Avenue subway station served by the 2 and 5 trains.

== History ==
The line was built in 1895, connecting the 39th Street Ferry to the Canarsie Depot at Hegeman Avenue and Rockaway Avenue and a tunnel under Ocean Parkway. The streetcars continued to operate until October 30, 1956 when buses were substituted.

The Gravesend and Church Avenues Line ("13-Gravesend-Church") was physically a branch from the main line though it operated as a separate service, starting from the 16th Avenue loop at Gravesend Avenue (present-day McDonald Avenue) in Kensington heading north along Gravesend Avenue and joining the main line at Gravesend Avenue and Church Avenue. The operation as a separate line ended on June 1, 1949 though the same physical service was continued as a branch of the newly renumbered "35-Church Avenue Line" (renumbered from the "8-Church Avenue Line") until the end of Brooklyn streetcar operations.

Service on the McDonald Avenue portion of the line immediately after its demise was covered by a free transfer to the then-extended B69 Prospect Park West, 8th Avenue, and Vanderbilt Avenue bus route (the line has since been truncated at Windsor Terrace, then rerouted via 7th Avenue and extended back to Kensington-Cortelyou Road). After the truncation of the B69, the B67 McDonald Avenue and 7th Avenue bus route was extended to Cortelyou Road (which is slightly north of the old 16th Avenue Loop) which remains the same presently.

In 1975, the New York City Transit Authority began offering free transfers to it from the subway as a replacement for the Culver Shuttle.

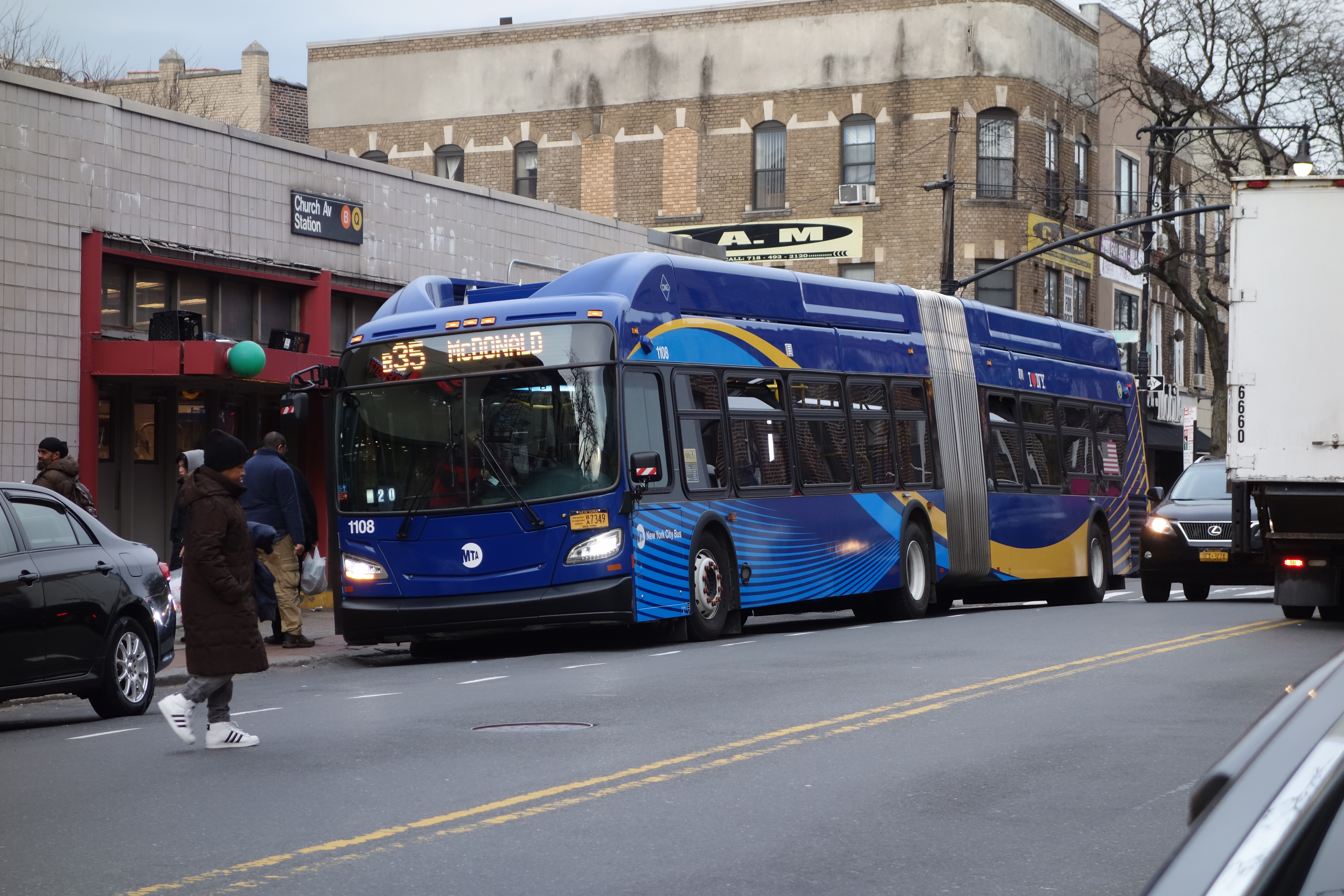
A 2018 XN60 (1108) on the B35 local at Flatbush’s Church Avenue/East 18th Street in January 2019, set to short-turn at McDonald Avenue.

In 2018, the B35 was considered for conversion from 40 ft (12 m) buses to articulated buses (or 60 ft (18 m) buses). 3 New Flyer XN60 buses were delivered for clearance testing by the beginning of summer 2018, with full operation of artics beginning September 2, 2018. The XN60s are the first CNG powered articulated buses in New York City, being assigned to Jackie Gleason Depot. The B35 Limited is also being considered for conversion to Select Bus Service, a bus rapid transit system operated by NYC Bus.

Bus lanes for the B35 on Church Avenue between East 7th Street and Marlborough Road were put into effect in October 2019.

On December 1, 2022, the MTA released a draft redesign of the Brooklyn bus network. As part of the redesign, all B35 local buses would operate to Sunset Park at all times, and closely-spaced stops would be removed. The B35 Limited would be replaced by the B55, a new Crosstown or Select Bus Service route running from Kensington to John F. Kennedy International Airport via Church Avenue, New Lots Avenue, Linden Boulevard, and North and South Conduit Avenue.

Starting from 2023, the B35 and B70 had its terminal changed in Sunset Park due to NYCDEP sewer work. Rather than terminating at 39th Street and 1st Avenue, instead it would make a right onto 2nd Avenue, then terminate and start at 37th Street. B35 buses also made an extra stop at 37 Street and 4th Avenue, serving the 36th Street (BMT Fourth Avenue Line) during this time. However, due to the lot buses used to turn around at Sunset Park being repurposed after NYCDEP work, this became a permanent service pattern, starting January 11, 2026.

== Incidents ==
On March 19, 2021, two buses (#1103 and #1107) nearly collided into each other and caused a gridlock, intersecting 13th Avenue and 39th Street. Both drivers exited their buses and instructed each other to back their buses up, where their quarrel was filmed. As one of the pedestrians was filming the commotion, one of the bus drivers attempted to snatch the phone from the pedestrian who was approaching him, but failed. A third bus driver in league with MTA, who was a passenger on one of the buses, helped guide traffic so that one of the buses could go through. Both MTA drivers involved in this incident were temporarily suspended due to operational, conduct, and mask violations. It was later revealed that a minivan and a shipping container were illegally parked on one side of the street.

== See also ==
=== Connecting bus routes ===
- B37 (at Third Avenue)
- B63 (at Fifth Avenue)
- B70 (at Eighth Avenue)
- B16 (at 13th/14th Avenues)
- B67, B69 (at McDonald Avenue)
- B103, BM3, BM4 (at Ocean Parkway)
- B68 (at Coney Island Avenue)
- B41 (at Flatbush Avenue)
- B49 (at Bedford/Rogers Avenues)
- B44 SBS (at Rogers/Nostrand Avenues)
- B44 (at Nostrand/New York Avenues)
- B46, B46 SBS (at Utica Avenue)
- B7 (at Kings Highway)
- B8, B17, B47 (at Ralph/Remsen Avenues)
- B60 (at Rockaway Avenue)
- B15 (at East 98th Street/Mother Gaston Boulevard)
