= Beverly Road station =

New York City Subway station in Brooklyn

Beverly Road
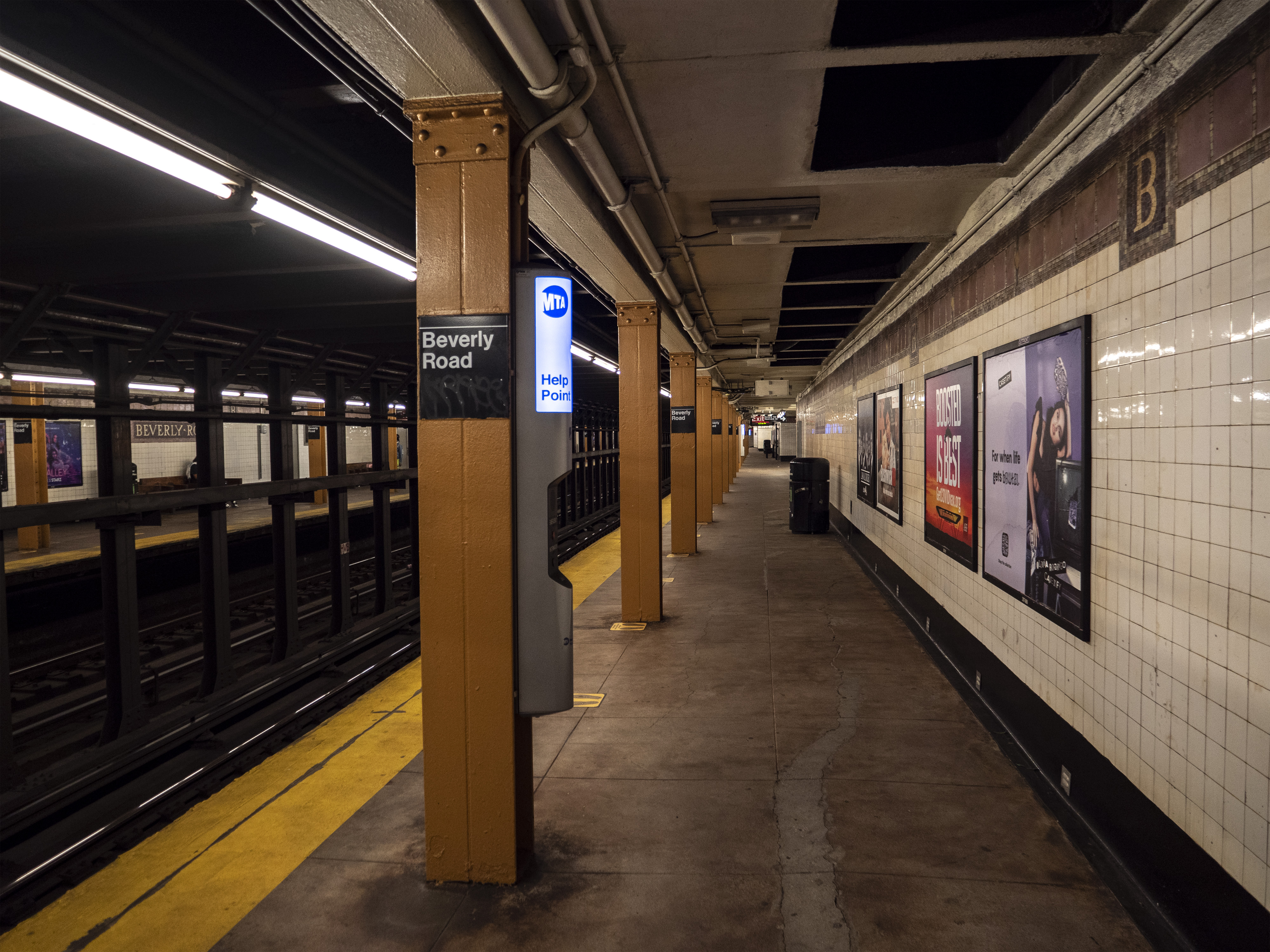
- View from southbound platform

Station statistics
- Address: Beverley Road & Nostrand Avenue; Brooklyn, New York
- Borough: Brooklyn
- Locale: Flatbush, East Flatbush
- Coordinates: 40.645122°N 73.94906°W
- Division: A (IRT)
- Line: IRT Nostrand Avenue Line
- Services: 2 (all times); 5 (weekdays only)
- Transit: NYCT Bus: B44
- Structure: Underground
- Platforms: 2 side platforms
- Tracks: 2

Other information
- Opened: August 23, 1920; 106 years ago

Traffic
- 2025: 1,056,211 ▲9.5%
- Rank: 300 out of 423
Services
| Preceding station | New York City Subway | Following station |
|---|---|---|
| Church Avenue 2 5 via Franklin Avenue–Medgar Evers College | 2 (New York City Subway service) 5 (New York City Subway service) | Newkirk Avenue–Little Haiti 2 5 toward Flatbush Avenue–Brooklyn College |
Location
Location within New York City Subway
Location within New York City
Location within New York
Track layout
Street map
Station service legend
| Symbol | Description |
| Stops all times | Stops all times |
| Stops weekdays during the day | Stops weekdays during the day |
| Stops weekdays and weekday late nights | Stops weekdays and weekday late nights |
| Stops all times except late nights | Stops all times except late nights |

The Beverly Road station is a station on the IRT Nostrand Avenue Line of the New York City Subway. It is located at the intersection of Beverley Road and Nostrand Avenue straddling the East Flatbush and Flatbush communities. The station is served by the 2 train at all times and the 5 train on weekdays.

== History ==
The Dual Contracts, which were signed on March 19, 1913, were contracts for the construction and/or rehabilitation and operation of rapid transit lines in the City of New York. The Dual Contracts promised the construction of several lines in Brooklyn. As part of Contract 4, the IRT agreed to build a subway line along Nostrand Avenue in Brooklyn. The construction of the subway along Nostrand Avenue spurred real estate development in the surrounding areas. The Nostrand Avenue Line opened on August 23, 1920, and the Beverly Road station opened along with it.

During the 1950s the platforms were lengthened at their southern ends, so that the platforms could be 510 feet long and as a result they were then able to accommodate 10-car trains.

== Station layout ==
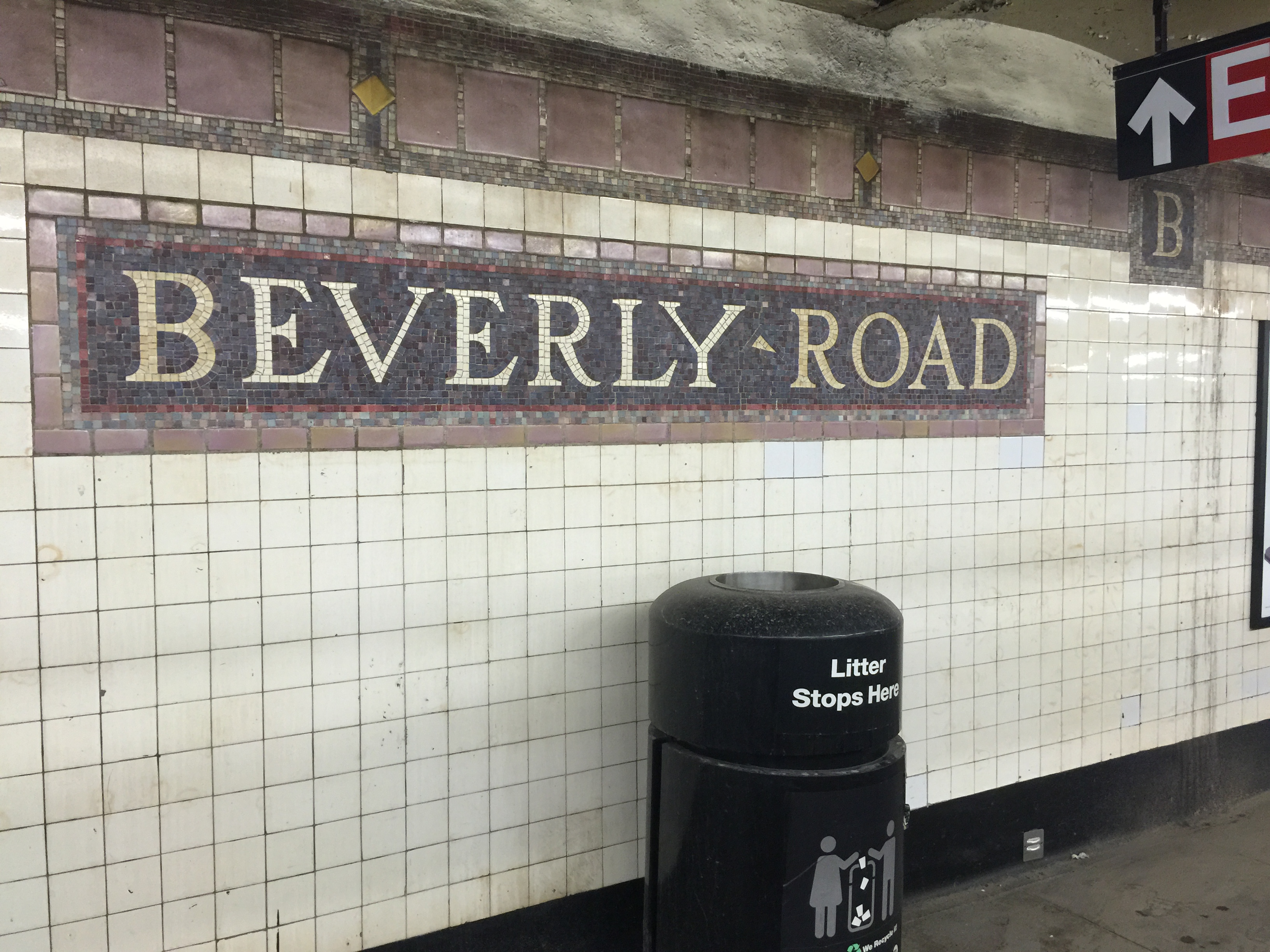
Station name tilework

This underground station has two tracks and two side platforms. The station is served by the 2 train at all times and by the 5 train on weekdays during the day. It is between Newkirk Avenue to the south and Church Avenue to the north. Fixed platform barriers, which are intended to prevent commuters falling to the tracks, are positioned near the platform edges. Both platforms have their original IRT style trim line and name tablets. The trim line is pink with a brown border and "B" tablets for "Beverly" running at regular intervals. The name tablets read "BEVERLY ROAD" in a serif font on a brown background and pink border. The platforms only have I-beam columns near fare control in the center and these are painted yellow. The platforms are narrower and have cinder-block tiles at either ends, where they were extended in the 1950s to accommodate the current standard "A" Division train length of 510 feet. Here, there are signs reading "BEVERLY ROAD" in white arial font on a gray background.

This station's name is spelled with two "e"s while the Beverley Road station on the BMT Brighton Line on the same street is spelled with three "e"s. That is because the street is split in half at Flatbush Avenue. To the west, it is spelled with three "e"s and to the east, formerly with two; the Nostrand Avenue Line station serves the eastern half of Beverley (formerly Beverly) Road.

=== Exits ===
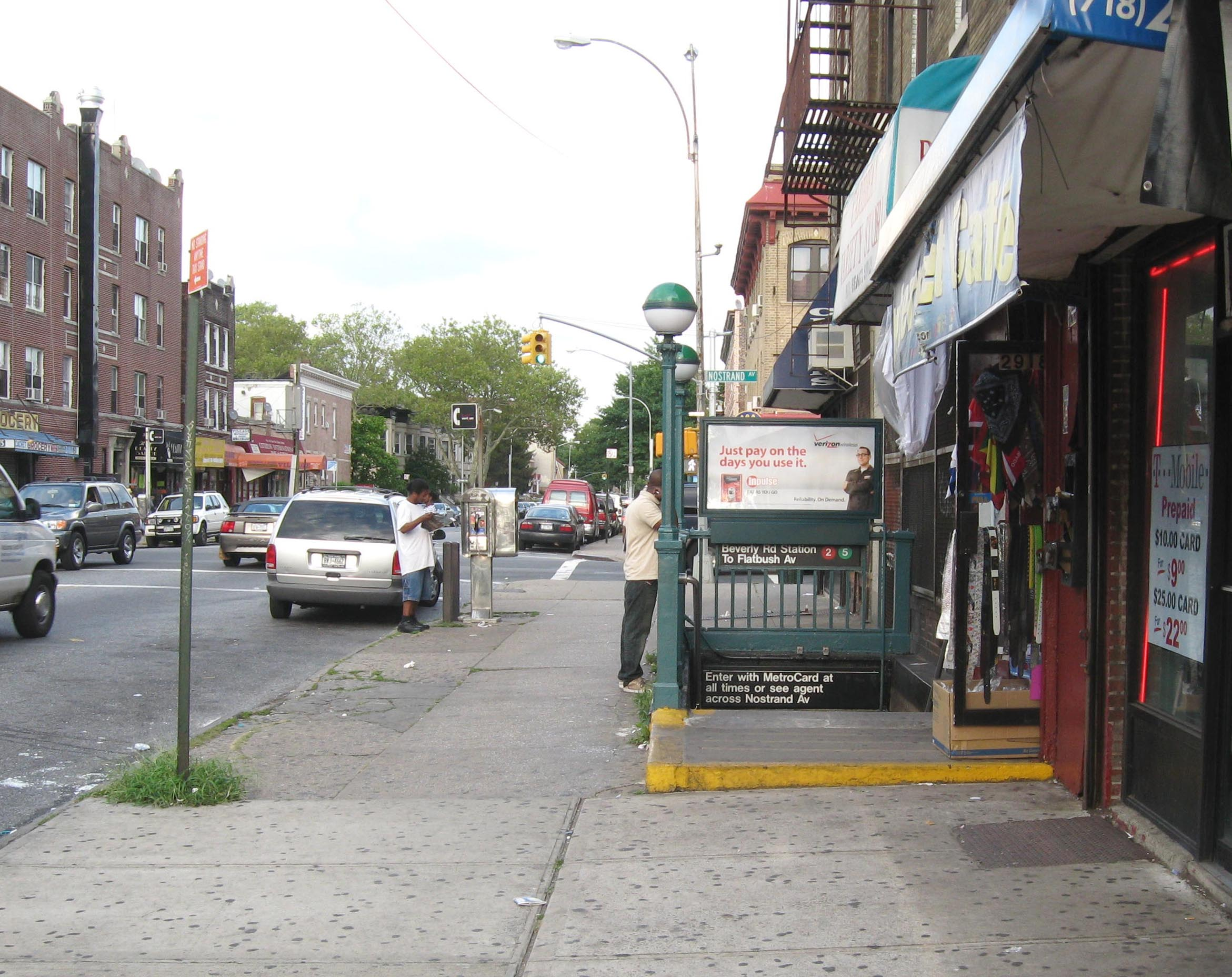
Southbound street stair

Each platform has one fare control area on the same level and there are no crossovers or crossunders to allow free transfers between directions. The Manhattan-bound one has a small turnstile bank, token booth, and one staircase going up to the southeast corner of Beverly Road and Nostrand Avenue. The Flatbush Avenue-bound platform's fare control is unstaffed, containing two exit-only turnstiles, one High Entry/Exit Turnstile, and one staircase going up to the southwest corner of Beverly Road and Nostrand Avenue.
