= Church of St. Francis of Assisi and St. Blaise (Brooklyn) =

Church in Brooklyn, New York

Coordinates: 40°39′40.6″N 73°57′1″W

The Church of Saint Francis of Assisi and Saint Blaise
- Interactive map of the The Church of Saint Francis of Assisi and Saint Blaise area

General information
- Architectural style: Italian Renaissance (for present church)
- Location: Prospect Lefferts Gardens, Brooklyn, New York City, New York, United States
- Construction started: August 28, 1898 (cornerstone for first church laid); 1913 (for present church)
- Completed: 1909 (for first school, now chapel and parish hall); 1914 (for present church); 1937 (for present school)
- Demolished: 1913 (for first church)
- Cost: $100,000 (for present church)
- Client: Roman Catholic Archdiocese of New York

Technical details
- Structural system: Bluff brick and limestone masonry (for present church); Red brick masonry (for assorted other structures)

Design and construction
- Architect: William J. Ryan

The Church of Saint Francis of Assisi and Saint Blaise is a Roman Catholic parish church in the Roman Catholic Diocese of Brooklyn, located at Nostrand Avenue and Lincoln Road, in Prospect Lefferts Gardens, Brooklyn, New York City, New York 11225.

== Parish history ==
The parish of Saint Francis of Assisi was established in 1898.

The parish of Saint Francis of Assisi merged with that of Saint Blaise, which had been established in 1905 out of the Holy Cross parish. Effective January 31, 2011, the merged parish of St. Francis of Assisi - St. Blaise absorbed the territorial boundaries of the former Parish of Saint Ignatius Loyola (established 1908), wherein "all the assets and obligations [including the parochial registers and the seals] currently belonging to the former Parish of Saint Ignatius are by this canonical decree transferred to the Parish of Saint Francis of Assisi – Saint Blaise." The Church of Saint Ignatius, Nostrand Ave and Carroll Street, Crown Heights, Brooklyn was used as a chapel of ease within the merged parish. The Church of St. Ignatius was finally closed and DiMarzio authorized the future sale of the land in 2013. The combined parish church is run by the Marist Brothers (Marists in the U.S. / the Society of Mary).

== Buildings ==
The cornerstone for the first church of St. Francis of Assisi was laid August 28, 1898 by Bishop McDonnell. The structure was small "on a lot 205 feet by 320 feet, [Rev. Ludeke] built a church and a rectory, and later a parish hall and young men's lyceum. In 1909, he erected a red brick school, with frontage of 62 feet and a depth of 130 feet, which accommodates about 1,000 children, in 16 classrooms thoroughly equipped with all modern improvements [as stated in 1914]." "The convent for the Sisters of St. Joseph is also a red brick building with a chapel. The old church was removed and a new church in Italian Renaissance style was commenced in 1913, which is to be ready for dedication in September 1914. William J. Ryan is the architect. The new church is to cost $100,000, have an inclined floor and altars of Carrara marble and a dome of copper. It will be built of bluff brick and limestone, and seat 1,025." The Rectory of St. Francis of Assisi/St. Blaise Parish (formerly the rectory of St. Francis of Assisi) is located around the corner from the church and school at 319 Maple Street. "The first school building, located on Maple Street, was constructed in 1909 and is now the Parish Center and Chapel. The current school building, located on Lincoln Road, was constructed in 1937." It has "15 classrooms, a technology lab, an art room, a library, 5 offices, two bookrooms, a faculty room and a large auditorium/gymnasium."

== Musical Instruments ==
The 18 tubular bells in the church were made by the J.C. Deagan Company of Chicago, which was a widely respected manufacturer of tuned percussion instruments ranging from church bells to vibraphones, and are controlled by an electrical keyboard and possibly paper rolls. They were installed by C.J. Lustig in 1924. Deagan's design was considered a "radical improvement in carillons for churches and public buildings, consisting of massive tubular bells, equipped with dampers to eliminate tone intermingling, controlled electrically, and playable both manually from keyboard and automatically from perforated paper rolls, under clock control." The church's pipe organ was built by Reuben Midmer & Sons in 1917, and was rebuilt by the successor Midmer-Losh Organ Company in 1932.

== Pastors of St. Blaise ==
- Rev. Francis Ludeke of Holy Cross Church (1897-1898)
- Rev. Malone of Holy Cross Church (1898-1905)
- Rev. Joseph Bonaventure, temporary pastor, (1905-?)
- Rev. Simonetti, temporary pastor, (?-June 20, 1911)
- Rev. Vincent A. Di Giovanni, first official pastor, (June 20, 1911-?)

== Pastors of St. Ignatius Loyola (1908-2011) ==
- Rev. Thomas E. Murphy, S.J. (1908-?)

== Pastors of St. Francis of Assisi / St. Blaise ==
- Rev. Juan Gonzalez (-2016).
- Very Rev. Msgr. Paul W. Jervis (2016)

== St. Francis of Assisi Parish School ==
The school building, located on the corner of Nostrand Avenue and Lincoln Road, is adjacent to the parish church of St. Francis of Assisi/St. Blaise Church. The school was established in 1909 and offers instructions from Pre-Kindergarten through 8th grade. The school administrators are Sr. Theresa Scanlon, CSJ and Sr. Barbara Yander, CSJ.
