= Little Haiti, Brooklyn =

Neighborhood in New York City

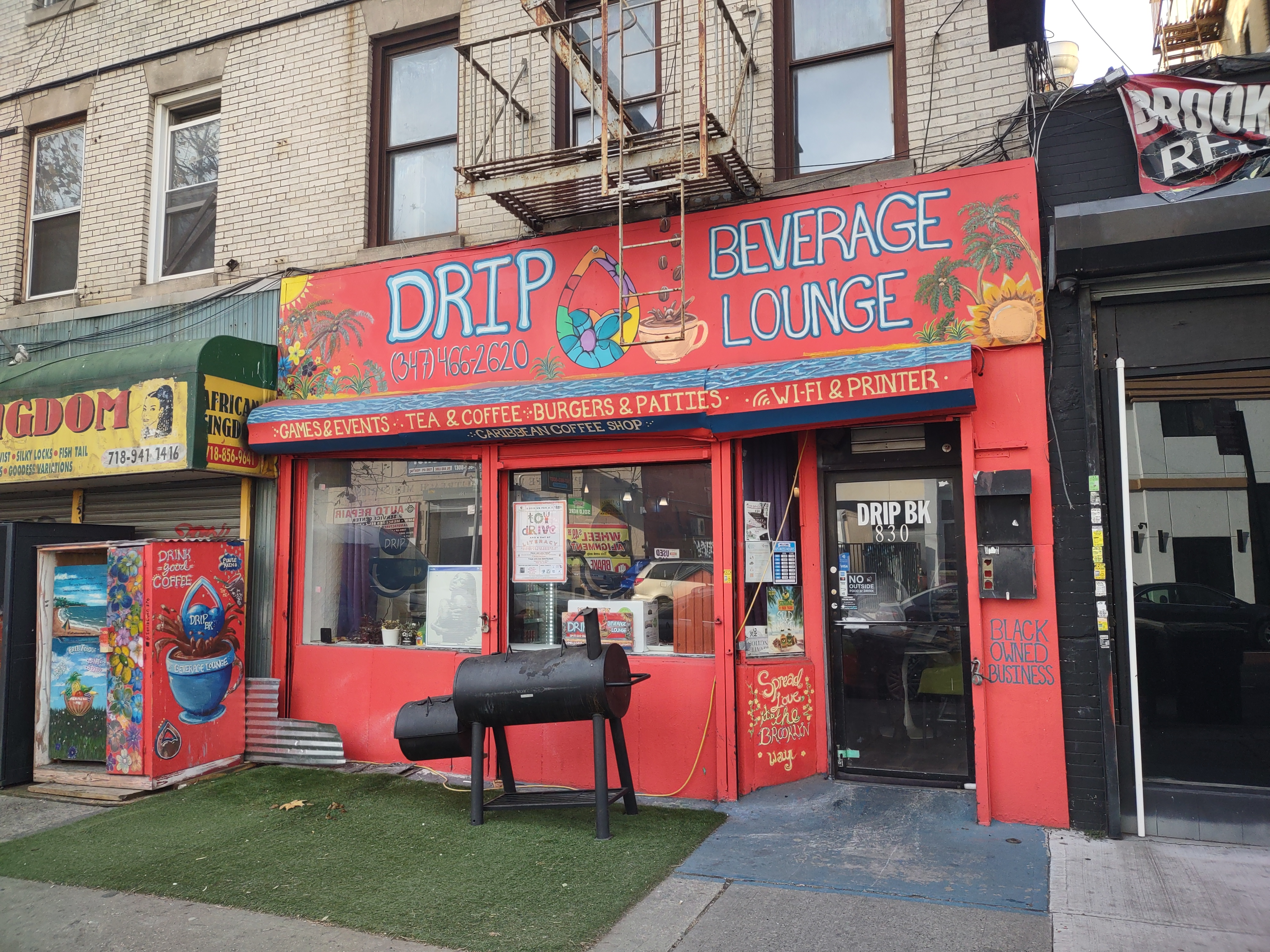
Drip Beverage Lounge in Little Haiti

Little Haiti is a neighborhood in the Flatbush section of the New York City borough of Brooklyn. Designated by city government in 2018, its boundaries are East 16th Street to the west, Church Avenue to the north, Avenue H and Parkside Avenue to the south, and Brooklyn Avenue to the east.

Little Haiti has the highest concentration of Haitian-owned businesses in the city including a café.

== Characteristics ==
Churches in the area hold services in Haitian Creole, one of New York City's top ten languages.

In addition to having Toussaint Louverture Boulevard and Little Haiti Cultural Center, the neighborhood hosts the Annual Haitian Cultural Day Parade and Festival, which started in 2019.

== History ==
Haitian immigrants began settling in the area in the 1960s and 1970s. Little Haiti has the highest concentration of Haitian-owned businesses in New York City.

== 21st century ==
In early 2021, the New York State Assembly passed a bill presented by State Assemblywoman Rodneyse Bichotte Hermelyn providing funding for renaming the New York City Subway's Newkirk Avenue station to Newkirk Avenue–Little Haiti station. The proposed name was meant to recognize the recent designation of the area due to the large Haitian community in the vicinity around the station. On November 15, 2021, the station was renamed with a formal rededicatation on November 18, 2021, the 203rd anniversary of the Battle of Vertières (the last major battle of the Haitian Revolution).

Haitian-owned businesses in the neighborhood include Sweet Sundays Café on Beverly Road which was opened in May 2024 and features Cremas Latte.

In February 2025 after the Trump administration announced an end to Temporary Protected Status for over 500,000 people, Haitian immigrants, even those with legal status, reacted by staying home. People of Haitian descent continued to be targeted that summer.

== See also ==
- Little Caribbean, Brooklyn
