= Newkirk Avenue–Little Haiti station =

New York City Subway station in Brooklyn

Newkirk Avenue–Little Haiti
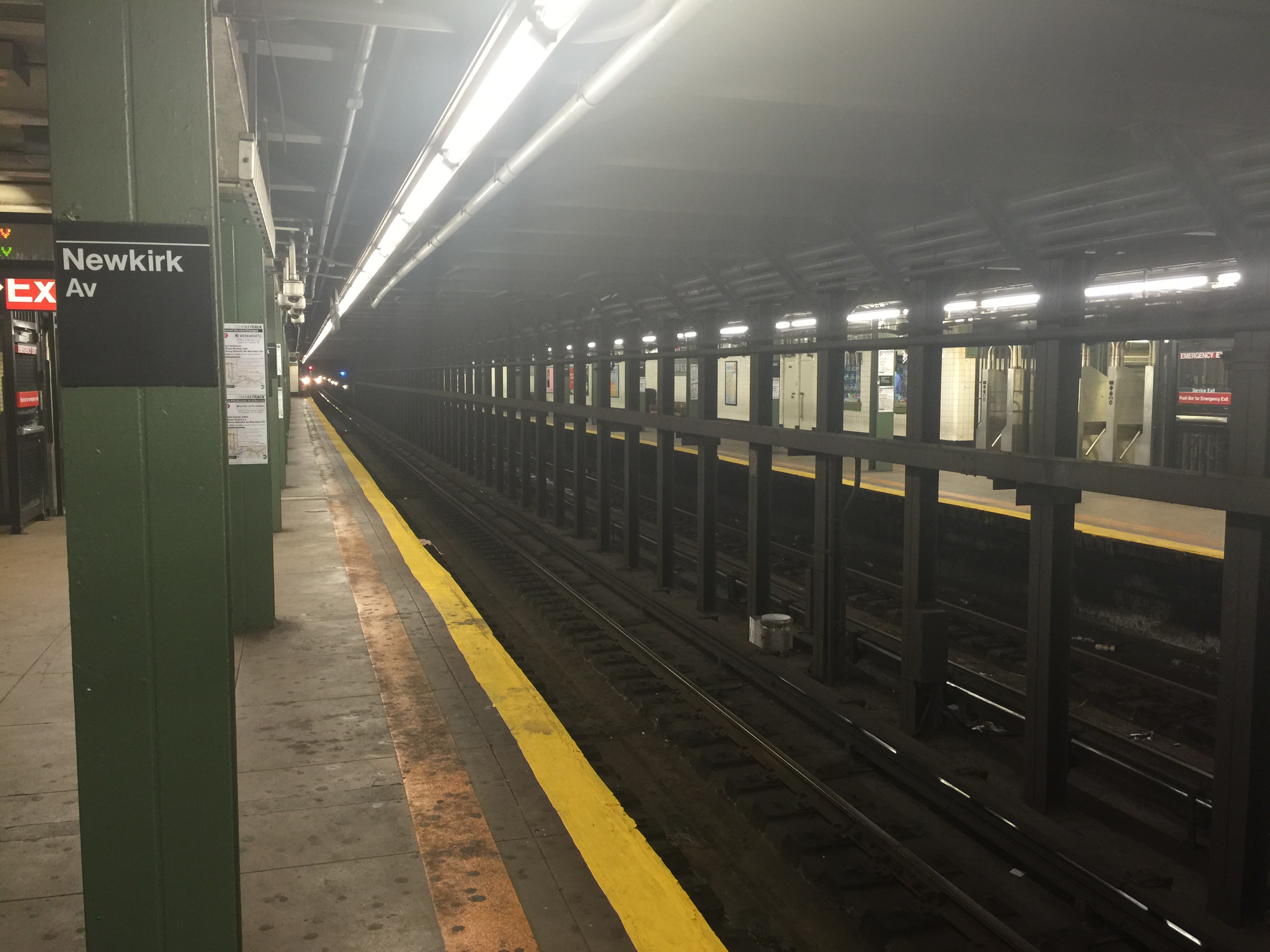
- View from the northbound platform, with R142 5 train arriving in the distance

Station statistics
- Address: Newkirk Avenue & Nostrand Avenue; Brooklyn, New York
- Borough: Brooklyn
- Locale: Flatbush, East Flatbush
- Coordinates: 40.639912°N 73.94846°W
- Division: A (IRT)
- Line: IRT Nostrand Avenue Line
- Services: 2 (all times); 5 (weekdays only)
- Transit: NYCT Bus: B8, B44, B44 SBS
- Structure: Underground
- Platforms: 2 side platforms
- Tracks: 2

Other information
- Opened: August 23, 1920; 106 years ago
- Former/other names: Newkirk Ave (1920-2021)

Traffic
- 2025: 1,607,635 ▲11.3%
- Rank: 218 out of 423
Services
Preceding station	New York City Subway	Following station
Beverly Road 2 5 via Franklin Avenue–Medgar Evers College	2 (New York City Subway service) 5 (New York City Subway service)	Flatbush Avenue–Brooklyn College 2 5 Terminus
Location
Location within New York City Subway
Location within New York City
Location within New York
Track layout
Street map
Station service legend
Symbol	Description
Stops all times	Stops all times
Stops weekdays during the day	Stops weekdays during the day
Stops weekdays and weekday late nights	Stops weekdays and weekday late nights
Stops all times except late nights	Stops all times except late nights

The Newkirk Avenue–Little Haiti station (originally Newkirk Avenue) is a station on the IRT Nostrand Avenue Line of the New York City Subway. Located at the intersection of Newkirk and Nostrand Avenues in Brooklyn, the station is served by the 2 train at all times and the 5 train on weekdays.

== History ==
The Dual Contracts, which were signed on March 19, 1913, were contracts for the construction and/or rehabilitation and operation of rapid transit lines in the City of New York. The Dual Contracts promised the construction of several lines in Brooklyn. As part of Contract 3, the IRT agreed to build a subway line along Nostrand Avenue in Brooklyn. The construction of the subway along Nostrand Avenue spurred real estate development in the surrounding areas. The Nostrand Avenue Line opened on August 23, 1920, and the Beverly Road station opened along with it.

In the 1950s, an additional exit-only was constructed on the Flatbush Avenue–bound platform that leads to the west side of Nostrand Avenue just south of Avenue D.

During the 1960s platform extensions were constructed at the southern ends of the platforms. They lengthened the platforms to 514 feet (157 m) long and allowed them to accommodate 10-car trains.

In early 2021, the New York State Assembly passed a bill presented by state assemblywoman Rodneyse Bichotte Hermelyn. The legislation provides funding for renaming the Newkirk Avenue station to Newkirk Avenue–Little Haiti station. The proposed name was meant to recognize the large Haitian community in the area around the station, a neighborhood known as Little Haiti. On November 15, 2021, the Newkirk Avenue station was renamed. The station was formally rededicated on November 18, 2021, the 203rd anniversary of the Battle of Vertières (the last major battle of the Haitian Revolution). The northbound platform at this station was closed for station rehabilitation at all times from February 23, 2026 until to the mid-March 2026. The southbound platform at this station was closed for station rehabilitation at all times from mid-March 2026 to early-April 2026.

== Station layout ==
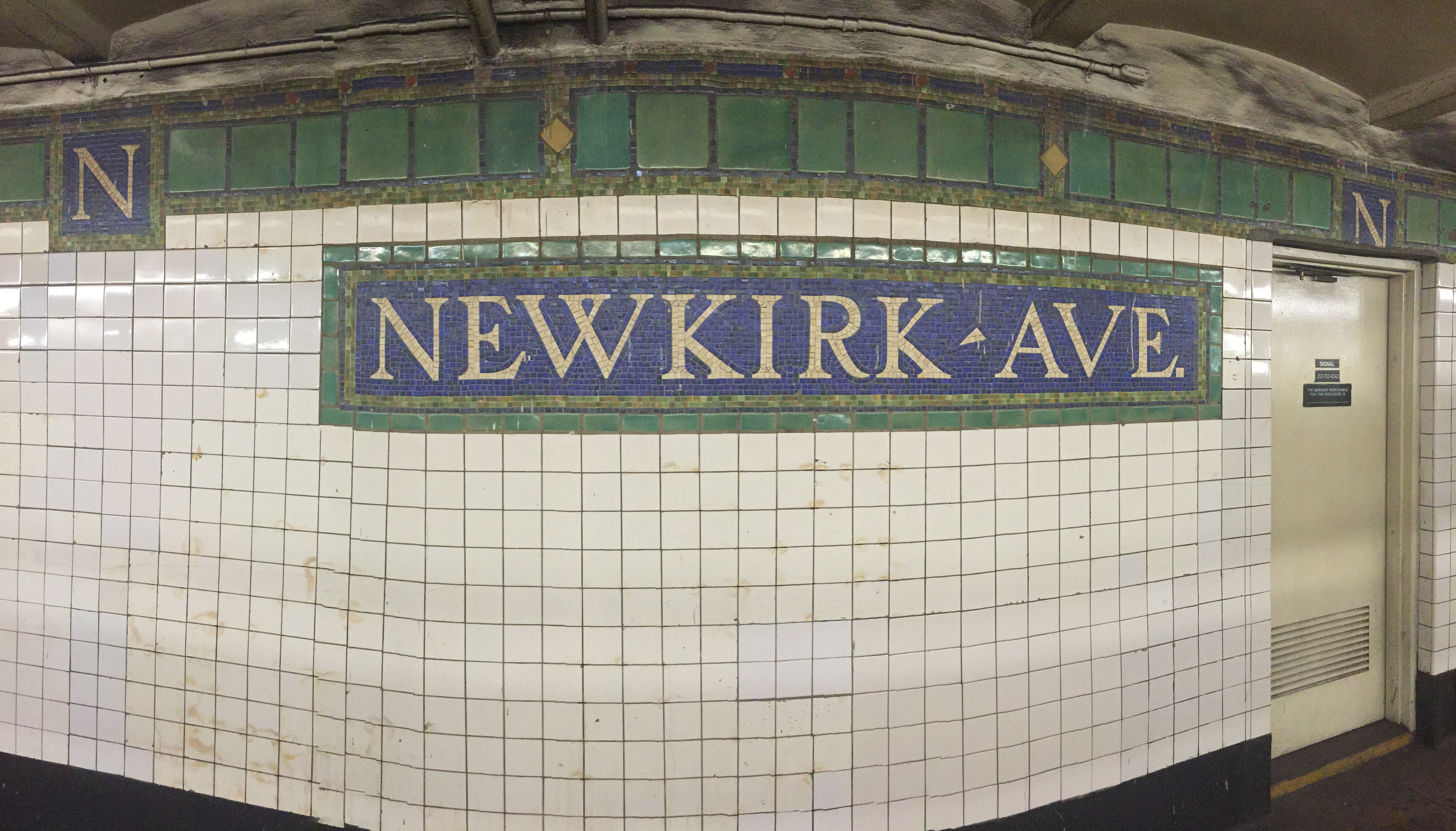
Station tilework

This underground station has two tracks and two side platforms. The station is served by the 2 train at all times and by the 5 train on weekdays during the day. It is between Flatbush Avenue–Brooklyn College to the south and Beverly Road to the north. Each platform has its own fare control with no crossovers or crossunders to allow free transfers between directions, though there is evidence of a closed crossunder at the south end of the station.

The platforms have their original 1920s tiling from the Dual Contracts era. The "NEWKIRK AVE" name tablets are on a blue background with a green border. The station's trim line is nearly fully green with accents of several other colors. "N"s for "Newkirk" run along the trim line at regular intervals. The platform columns run at regular intervals and are painted green to match the station's tiling. They are wider in the middle of each platform where the station exits and fare control are. They get narrower as they run toward either end of the platform, especially at the extreme ends where the 1960s extension refrigerator-block style tiling is used. The columns have "Newkirk" written in white on a blue plate.

=== Exits ===
The Manhattan-bound platform has the station's only bank of regular turnstiles and token booth. Its street stair leads to the southeast corner of Newkirk and Nostrand Avenues. The fare control for the Flatbush Avenue-bound platform is normally unstaffed, containing one High Entry Exit Turnstile and one exit-only turnstile. A Customer Service Agent Booth and bank of regular turnstiles is sometimes open during rush hours. This exit's street stair leads to the southwest corner of Newkirk and Nostrand Avenues.

The Flatbush Avenue-bound platform has an additional exit-only on the extreme north end. This exit has two high turnstiles and its single street stair leads to the west side of Nostrand Avenue just south of Avenue D. This exit was added in the 1950s.
