= Church Avenue station (IRT Nostrand Avenue Line) =

New York City Subway station in Brooklyn

Church Avenue
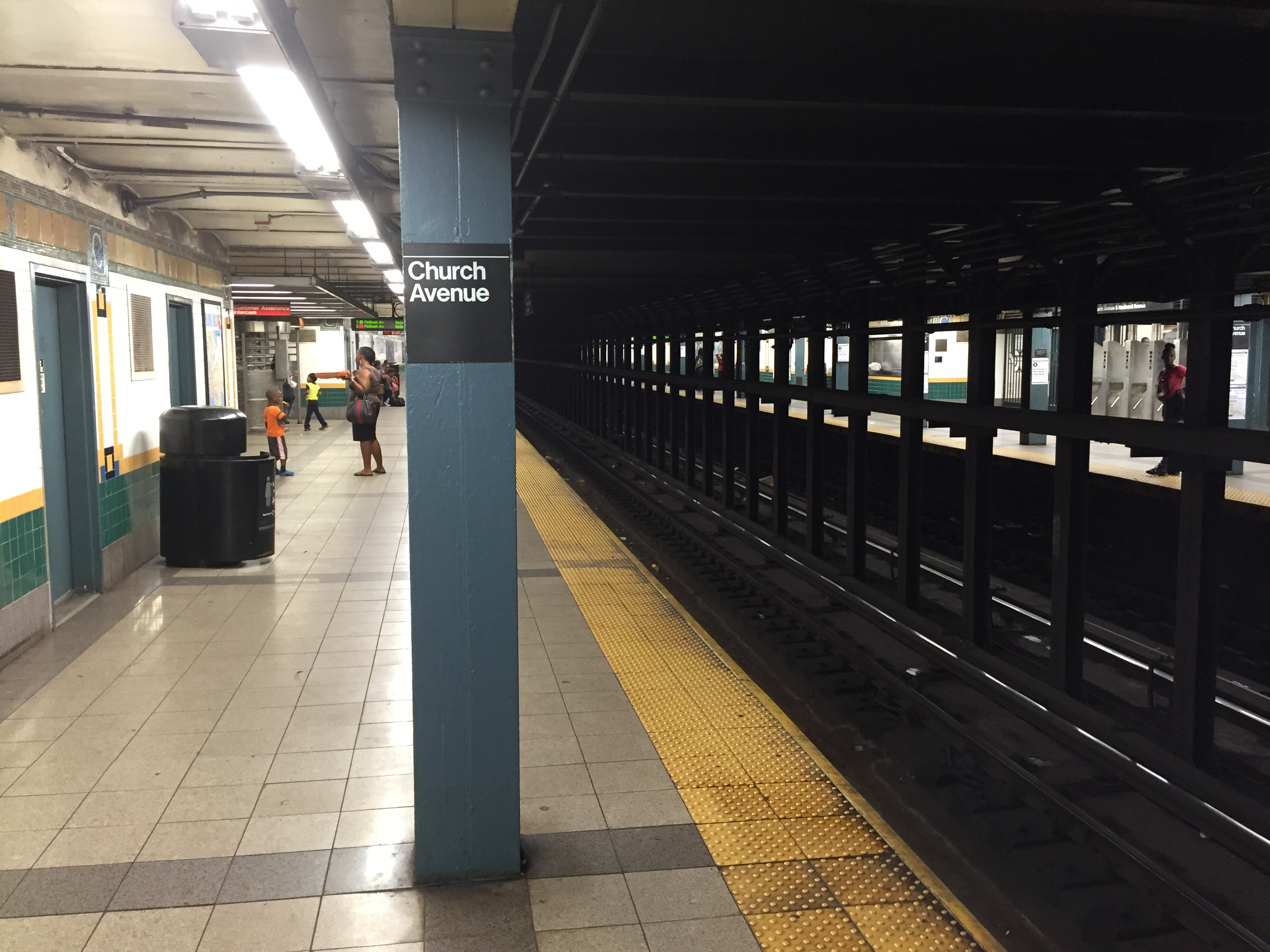
- Southbound platform

Station statistics
- Address: Church Avenue & Nostrand Avenue; Brooklyn, New York
- Borough: Brooklyn
- Locale: East Flatbush, Flatbush
- Coordinates: 40.650755°N 73.950005°W
- Division: A (IRT)
- Line: IRT Nostrand Avenue Line
- Services: 2 (all times); 5 (weekdays only)
- Transit: NYCT Bus: B35, B44, B44 SBS
- Structure: Underground
- Platforms: 2 side platforms
- Tracks: 2

Other information
- Opened: August 23, 1920; 106 years ago
- Accessible: Yes

Traffic
- 2025: 2,165,428 ▲14.7%
- Rank: 171 out of 423
Services
Preceding station	New York City Subway	Following station
Winthrop Street 2 5 via Franklin Avenue–Medgar Evers College	2 (New York City Subway service) 5 (New York City Subway service)	Beverly Road 2 5 toward Flatbush Avenue–Brooklyn College
Location
Location within New York City Subway
Location within New York City
Location within New York
Track layout
Street map
Station service legend
Symbol	Description
Stops all times	Stops all times
Stops weekdays during the day	Stops weekdays during the day
Stops weekdays and weekday late nights	Stops weekdays and weekday late nights
Stops all times except late nights	Stops all times except late nights

The Church Avenue station is a station on the IRT Nostrand Avenue Line of the New York City Subway. Located at the intersection of Church and Nostrand Avenues straddling the East Flatbush and Flatbush communities, the station is served by the 2 train at all times and the 5 train on weekdays.

== History ==
The Dual Contracts, which were signed on March 19, 1913, were contracts for the construction and/or rehabilitation and operation of rapid transit lines in the City of New York. The Dual Contracts promised the construction of several lines in Brooklyn. As part of Contract 4, the IRT agreed to build a subway line along Nostrand Avenue in Brooklyn. The construction of the subway along Nostrand Avenue spurred real estate development in the surrounding areas. The Nostrand Avenue Line opened on August 23, 1920, and the Church Avenue station opened along with it.

The station was renovated in 1997. In Spring 1999, elevators were installed to make the station fully ADA-accessible.

== Station layout ==
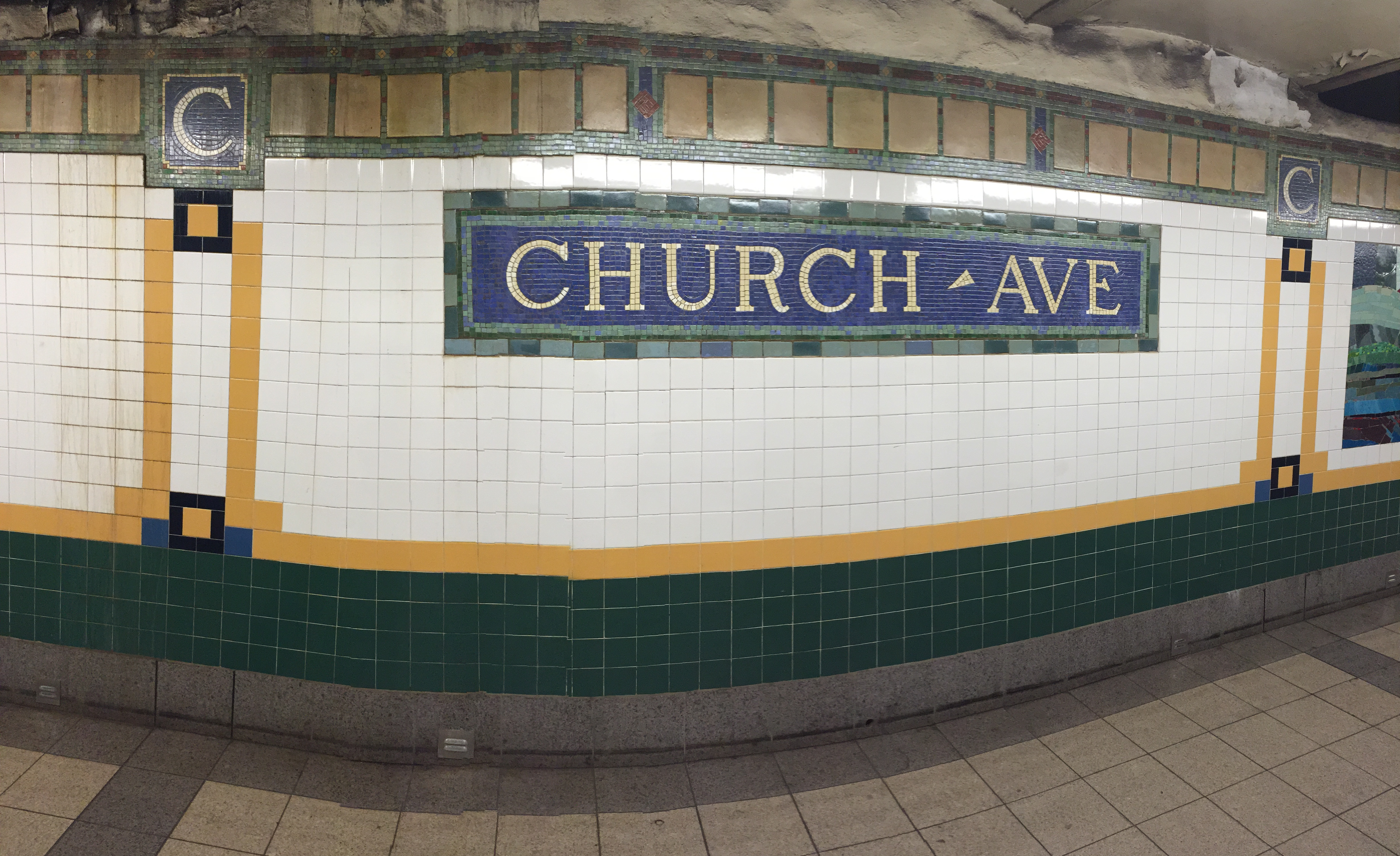
Tilework

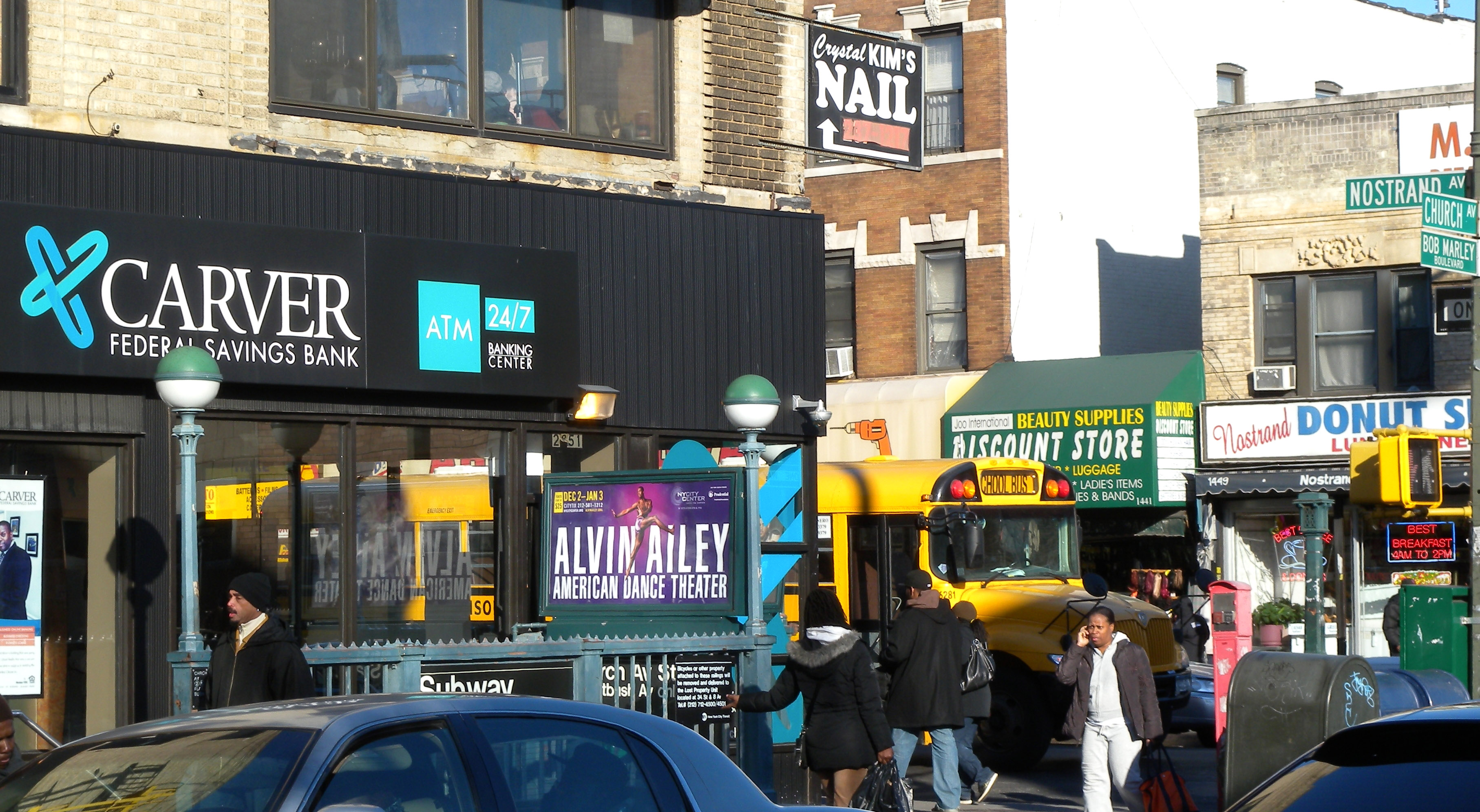
Southbound staircase at Church and Nostrand Avenues

This underground station has two tracks and two side platforms. South of the station, there are double crossovers that can allow trains to switch between either track. These crossovers can allow trains to terminate here. The station is served by the 2 train at all times and by the 5 train on weekdays during the day. It is between Beverly Road to the south and Winthrop Street to the north.

Each platform was re-tiled during a 1997 renovation with a reproduction of its original 1920 Dual Contracts era tiling. The name tablets contain "CHURCH AVE" in serif font on a blue background and green border. The station's trim line consists of light brown color with a mostly green border and "C" tablets (for "Church") at regular intervals.

Beneath the original trim line along the platform walls are streaks of many colors that were added during the 1997 renovation. There are green tiles for about the first two feet of the platform walls from the bottom up and single lines of yellow above them go up to form accent lines to the "C" tablets in the station's trim line.

The platforms are narrower at either ends than in the middle, where the station's exits are on the same level and the station columns are. The columns are dark blue colored I-beams and every other column has the standard black and white name tablet.

The Manhattan-bound platform has a newsstand and a plaque commemorating the station's 1997 renovation.

The 2001 artwork here is called Transitions by Louis Delsarte. It contains stained glass and glass mosaic murals depicting neighborhood and ethnic scenes.

=== Exits ===
The fare control area on the Manhattan-bound side has a full-time turnstile bank, token booth, and two perpendicular staircases to the northeast corner of Church and Nostrand Avenues and one staircase and one elevator to the southeast corner. The Flatbush Avenue-bound platform's fare control is unstaffed, containing three exit-only turnstiles and one HEET turnstile. This exit has two perpendicular staircases to the northwest corner of Church and Nostrand Avenues and one staircase and one elevator to the southwest corner. Both elevators, installed in Spring 1999, make this station fully ADA-accessible.

== See also ==
- Church Avenue (IND Culver Line)
- Church Avenue (BMT Brighton Line)
- Church Avenue Line (surface)
- IND Church Avenue Line
