= Louis Delsarte =

African-American artist (1944–2020)

Louis J. Delsarte
- Born: September 1, 1944; Brooklyn, New York
- Died: May 2, 2020 (aged 75); Atlanta, Georgia
- Education: Brooklyn College, Pratt Institute
- Known for: painter, muralist
- Website: www.louisdelsarte.net

Louis Jessup Delsarte III (September 1, 1944 – May 2, 2020) was an African-American artist known for what has sometimes been called his "illusionistic" style. He was a painter, muralist, printmaker, and illustrator.

When Delsarte was growing up, he was surrounded by music including jazz, opera, musicals, and the blues. From this experience, as well as from his knowledge of African history and culture, he has drawn much of the inspiration for his art. Delsarte was a professor of Fine Arts at Morehouse College in Atlanta, Georgia. For the past 13 years his work has been exhibited around the United States.

== Education, exhibitions, and critical recognition ==
Louise J. Desarte III was born in Brooklyn, New York, to Louis Desarte II and Llewellyn (Johnston) Delsarte, both educators. Delsarte went to Wingate High School in Brooklyn's Flatbush neighborhood, received a certificate in Fine Arts Education from Brooklyn College, earned his bachelor's degree in Fine Arts at New York City's Pratt Institute, and obtained a master's degree in Fine Arts at the University of Arizona.

Delsarte's work has been featured in solo and group exhibitions at museums, galleries, and other venues throughout the United States, including the Studio Museum in Harlem, the Metropolitan Museum of Art in New York, the Schomburg Center for Research in Black Culture in New York, the Bodley Gallery (also in New York), the California Afro-American Museum, the Camille Hanks Cosby Museum at Spelman College in Atlanta, Georgia, and the Howard University fine arts gallery. In 2001, Delsarte's work was included as part of a national traveling exhibition entitled "When the Spirit Moves: African-American Dance in History and Art". The traveling exhibition was sponsored by the Smithsonian Institution, having originated as a 1999-2000 exhibition at Spelman College (entitled "When the Spirit Moves: African American Art Inspired by Dance".

In 2001, Delsarte completed a large public mural commissioned by the city of New York. The monumental work, entitled "Transitions", is located at the Church Avenue station, on the Brooklyn IRT line.

Delsarte received further national recognition in August 2005 when the United States Postal Service issued a stamp featuring a Delsarte painting. The stamp depicts the march from Selma to Montgomery, Alabama, taken from a Delsarte painting created in 2000.

Also in 2005, Delsarte completed another monumental public mural, this one entitled "Spirit of Harlem". The 30 ft X 11 ft glass mosaic was assembled in Munich, Germany, and is located at North Fork Bank on 125th Street in[New York City.

In January 2010, Delsarte's 125-foot-long Martin Luther King Jr. Memorial Mural was dedicated at Peace Plaza in Atlanta, Georgia.

Significant critical recognition of Delsarte's contribution to American art has included discussion of his work in Samella Lewis's African American Art & Artists: a history of African American art from the seventeenth-century to the 1990s

His painting "Greenwood Lake", inspired by summers spent at Greenwood Forest Farms, where Langston Hughes also lived for a time, was made into an oversized 6'6" square panel for inclusion in the Greenwood Lake Mural Project by curator Melanie Gold. It can be viewed by the general public at 673 Jersey Ave in Greenwood Lake. The project also includes works by other artists, and was featured in a New York Times article

== Style and technique: a synthesis of chaotic abstraction and disciplined figuration ==
Delsarte's paintings are generally figurative and notable for their complex, layered look, enlivened with rapidly executed strokes in strong colors, as Adrienne Klein notes in an interview with the artist available online at the Union College website. Delsarte describes how he often creates a painting "over 10 to 12 sessions", sometimes laying the canvas on the floor and applying colors from every direction, "without even looking at the drawn image." Next, he allows the paint to dry and then works on the canvas vertically again for another phase of "disciplined drawing" — often going back to the floor for yet more work "when they [the images] have become too literal". Thus, Delsarte's technique reflects a concern for synthesizing the chaotic, unpredictable, irrational aspects of art-making with the tradition of making disciplined, representational images.

Klein draws a connection between these stylistic and technical features, taken together, and the influence of music on the artist's work: "In his paintings, the relationship between the figure and ground – the painted space outside of the figure – shifts and alters. The patterned liveliness of this space draws our eye and suggests the enveloping sound of music. The figures are woven into this vibrant atmosphere."

He died on 2 May 2020, in Atlanta, Georgia, at the age of 75.

== Monographs and solo shows ==
[Main sources for this list: (1) Worldcat; and (2) African American Visual Artists Database

- Atlanta (GA). Modern Primitive Gallery. LOUIS DELSARTE. 2001. Solo exhibition.
- Brooklyn (NY). Dorsey Gallery. LOUIS DELSARTE: Recent Works. 1993. Solo exhibition.
- Harris, Michael D.. The Spiritual and Mystical World of LOUIS DELSARTE, 1998.
- Los Angeles (CA). California Afro-American Museum. LOUIS DELSARTE: Gallery of Greats. 1991. Solo exhibition.
- Miami (FL). Frances Wolfson Art Center, Miami-Dade Community College. The Art of LOUIS DELSARTE. February 12 - March 13, 1987. Solo exhibition. [Smithsonian Archives of American Art].
- New Orleans (LA). Amistad Research Center. LOUIS DELSARTE. 1999. Solo exhibition.
- New Orleans (LA). Stella Jones Gallery. LOUIS DELSARTE: Reflections. 1998. Solo exhibition.
- New York (NY). Bodley Gallery. LOUIS DELSARTE. 1980.
- New York (NY). Gallery 62, National Urban League. LOUIS DELSARTE: New Visions. February 7-March 11, 1982. Solo exhibition.
- New York (NY). Gallery 62, National Urban League. LOUIS DELSARTE: No Place Like Home. 1991. Solo exhibition.
- New York (NY). NoHo Gallery. LOUIS DELSARTE: Between Heaven and Earth. 1990. Solo exhibition.
- Washington (DC). Curtis Lewis Gallery. LOUIS DELSARTE: Recent Works. 1998. Solo exhibition.
- Wichita (KS). African American Museum. LOUIS DELSARTE. 2005. Solo exhibition.
