= Brooklyn Community Board 17 =

Brooklyn Community District 17
- Community District
- Country: United States
- State: New York
- City: New York City
- Borough: Brooklyn
- Neighborhoods: List: East Flatbush; Remsen Village

Government
  - Chairperson: Rodrick Daley
  - District Manager: Sherif Fraser

Area
  - Total: 3.4 sq mi (8.8 km^{2})

Population (2020)
  - Total: 162,446 ▲
  - Density: 48,000/sq mi (18,000/km^{2})

Ethnicity
  - African-American: 78.3%
  - Hispanic and Latino (any race): 8.2%
  - White: 3.6%
  - Asian: 1.9%
  - Others: 7.6%
- Time zone: UTC−5 (Eastern)
  - Summer (DST): UTC−4 (EDT)
- ZIP codes: 11203, 11210,11212, 11213, 11226
- Area code: 718, 347, 929, and 917
- Police Precincts: 67th (website)
- Website: cbbrooklyn.cityofnewyork.us/cb17/

Brooklyn Community Board 17 is a New York City community board that encompasses the Brooklyn neighborhoods of East Flatbush, Remsen Village, Farragut, Rugby, Erasmus and Ditmas Village. The District is delimited by East 32nd Street, Glenwood Road, Nostrand Avenue, Foster Avenue, and Bedford Avenue on the west, Clarkson Avenue, Utica Avenue, and East New York Avenue on the north, East 98th Street on the east, as well as by the Long Island Rail Road on the south.

The board's current chairman is Rodrick Daley, and the District Manager is Sherif Fraser.

The land area is 3.1 square miles (8.0 km^{2}).

== Demographics ==
Historical population
Census	Pop.	Note	%±
1990	161,261		—
2000	165,753		2.8%
2010	155,252		−6.3%
2020	162,446		4.6%
U.S. Decennial Census

Population by race as of 2010 and 2020 censuses:
Race	2010		2020	
Black	137,243	88.40%	127,289	78.35%
White	2,204	1.35%	5,837	3.59%
Asian	1,734	1.12%	3,036	1.87%
Other	1,057	0.68%	2,301	1.41%
Multiracial	2,478	1.60%	10,670	6.56%
Hispanic (any race)	10,536	6.79%	13,313	8.19%
Total	155,252	100%	162,446	100%

As of the United States Census, 2020, District 17 has a population of 162,446, up from 165,753 in 2000 and 161,261 in 1990.

Approximately 50% of the population is foreign-born.
