= 2029 New York City borough president elections =

- November 6, 2029
	Majority party	Minority party
Party	Democratic	Republican
Seats before	4	1

The 2029 New York City borough president elections will be held on November 6, 2029, to elect the borough presidents of the five boroughs of New York City. They will be held concurrently with the mayoral election, as well as other local elections.

Four of the five incumbent borough presidents are term‑limited and cannot seek re‑election to a third consecutive four‑year term, as the New York City Charter limits borough presidents to two consecutive terms. This will result in five open seats for the first time since the 2001 elections. The filing deadline for candidates is expected to be in early 2029, with primary elections scheduled for June 2029.

== Background ==
The previous elections in 2025 saw the re‑election of four incumbents and the election of Brad Hoylman-Sigal to succeed Mark Levine in Manhattan. Four of the five incumbents from that election, Antonio Reynoso (Brooklyn), Donovan Richards (Queens), Vanessa Gibson (Bronx), and Vito Fossella (Staten Island), will have served two full terms by the end of 2029 and are legally barred from seeking a third term.

Several candidates have filed paperwork or publicly expressed interest in running.

== Overview ==
All five borough president seats will be up for election. The incumbents are as follows:

Borough	Incumbent president	Party	Term‑limited?
Brooklyn	Antonio Reynoso	Dem	Yes
Manhattan	Brad Hoylman-Sigal	Dem	No
Queens	Donovan Richards	Dem	Yes
Staten Island	Vito Fossella	Rep	Yes
The Bronx	Vanessa Gibson	Dem	Yes

== Manhattan ==
2029 Manhattan Borough President election
Incumbent Borough President
Brad Hoylman-Sigal
Democratic

Incumbent Democrat Brad Hoylman-Sigal is eligible to run for re-election to a second term.

=== Candidates ===
==== Filed paperwork ====
- Vincent K. Jenkins, candidate for borough president in 2025
- Brad Hoylman-Sigal, incumbent borough president

== Brooklyn ==
2029 Brooklyn Borough President election
Incumbent Borough President
Antonio Reynoso
Democratic

Incumbent Democrat Antonio Reynoso is term‑limited and cannot seek re‑election.

=== Candidates ===
==== Filed paperwork ====
- Rita Joseph, city councilmember from the 40th district (2022–present)
- Kevin Parker, state senator from the 21st district (2003–present)

==== Potential ====
- Khari Edwards, activist and candidate for borough president in 2021 and 2025

== Queens ==
2029 Queens Borough President election
Incumbent Borough President
Donovan Richards
Democratic

Incumbent Democrat Donovan Richards is term‑limited and cannot seek re‑election.

== The Bronx ==
2029 Bronx Borough President election
Incumbent Borough President
Vanessa Gibson
Democratic

Incumbent Democrat Vanessa Gibson is term‑limited and cannot seek re‑election.

=== Candidates ===
==== Filed paperwork ====
- Ismael Malave, candidate for comptroller in 2025

== Staten Island ==
2029 Staten Island Borough President election
Incumbent Borough President
Vito Fossella
Republican

Incumbent Republican Vito Fossella is term‑limited and cannot seek re‑election.

=== Candidates ===
==== Declared ====
- David Carr, Minority Leader of the New York City Council (2026–present) from the 50th district (2022–present)

==== Potential ====
- Mary Pat Fossella, wife of incumbent Vito Fossella

== See also ==
- 2029 New York City mayoral election
- 2029 New York City Comptroller election
- 2029 New York City Public Advocate election
- 2029 New York City Council election
