= New York City's 40th City Council district =

- Boundaries following the 2020 census

Government
  - Councilmember: . Rita Joseph. D–Flatbush

Population (2010)
  - Total: 146,522

Demographics
  - Black: 65%
  - Hispanic: 17%
  - White: 10%
  - Asian: 5%
  - Other: 3%

Registration
  - Democratic: 78.3%
  - Republican: 3.8%
  - No party preference: 15.3%
- Registered voters (2021) 108,994

New York City's 40th City Council district is one of 51 districts in the New York City Council. It has been represented by Democrat Rita Joseph since 2022. She succeeded term-limited Mathieu Eugene, who unsuccessfully ran for Brooklyn Borough President in 2021.

== Geography ==
=== 2020s ===
District 40 covers a series of majority-Black neighborhoods near the geographical center of Brooklyn, including all of Prospect Lefferts Gardens, most of Flatbush, and parts of Crown Heights, East Flatbush, Kensington, Borough Park and Windsor Terrace. The Prospect Park Parade Ground is also located within the district.

The district overlaps with Brooklyn Community Boards 7, 9, 12, 14, and 17, and with New York's 9th and 10th congressional districts. It also overlaps with the 20th, 21st, and 22nd districts of the New York State Senate, and with the 42nd, 43rd, 44th, 48th and 58th districts of the New York State Assembly.

=== 2010s ===
District 40 covers a series of majority-Black neighborhoods near the geographical center of Brooklyn, including all of Prospect Lefferts Gardens, most of Flatbush, and parts of East Flatbush, Crown Heights, Kensington, and Midwood. The Prospect Park Parade Ground is also located within the district.

The district overlaps with Brooklyn Community Boards 9, 12, 14, and 17, and with New York's 9th and 10th congressional districts. It also overlaps with the 17th, 20th, and 21st districts of the New York State Senate, and with the 42nd, 43rd, and 44th districts of the New York State Assembly.

== Members representing the district ==
| Members | Party | Years served | Electoral history |
|---|---|---|---|
District established January 1, 1992
| Una S. T. Clarke (Flatbush) | Democratic | January 1, 1992 – December 31, 2001 | Elected in 1991. Re-elected in 1993. Re-elected in 1997. Termed out. |
| Yvette Clarke (Flatbush) | Democratic | January 1, 2002 – December 31, 2006 | Elected in 2001. Re-elected in 2003. Re-elected in 2005. Resigned when elected to the U.S. House of Representatives. |
| Vacant | | December 31, 2006 – April 25, 2007 | |
| Mathieu Eugene (Flatbush) | Democratic | April 25, 2007 – December 31, 2021 | Elected to finish Clarke's term. Re-elected in 2007. Re-elected in 2009. Re-elected in 2013. Re-elected in 2017. Termed out. |
| Rita Joseph (Flatbush) | Democratic | January 1, 2022 – | Elected in 2021. Re-elected in 2023. Re-elected in 2025. |

== Recent election results ==
=== 2025 ===
2025 New York City Council election, District 40
| Party | Candidate | Votes | % |
|---|---|---|---|
| Democratic | Rita Joseph | 31,828 | |
| Working Families | Rita Joseph | 10,668 | |
| Total | Rita Joseph (incumbent) | 42,496 | 99.2 |
| Write-in | | 326 | 0.8 |
| Total votes | | 42,822 | 100.0 |
| Democratic hold | | | |

=== 2023 (redistricting) ===
Due to redistricting and the 2020 changes to the New York City Charter, councilmembers elected during the 2021 and 2023 City Council elections will serve two-year terms, with full four-year terms resuming after the 2025 New York City Council elections.

2023 New York City Council election, District 40
| Party | Candidate | Votes | % |
|---|---|---|---|
| Democratic | Rita Joseph | 8,534 | |
| Working Families | Rita Joseph | 2,621 | |
| Total | Rita Joseph (incumbent) | 11,155 | 96.2 |
| Medical Freedom | Daniel Lally | 327 | 2.8 |
| Write-in | | 114 | 1.0 |
| Total votes | | 11,596 | 100.0 |
| Democratic hold | | | |

=== 2021 ===
In 2019, voters in New York City approved Ballot Question 1, which implemented ranked-choice voting in all local elections. Under the new system, voters have the option to rank up to five candidates for every local office. Voters whose first-choice candidates fare poorly will have their votes redistributed to other candidates in their ranking until one candidate surpasses the 50 percent threshold. If one candidate surpasses 50 percent in first-choice votes, then ranked-choice tabulations will not occur.

2021 New York City Council election, District 40 Democratic primary
| Party | Candidate | Maximum round | Maximum votes | Share in maximum round | Maximum votes First round votes Transfer votes |
|---|---|---|---|---|---|
| Democratic | Rita Joseph | 10 | 10,065 | 59.6% | |
| Democratic | Josue Pierre | 10 | 6,829 | 40.4% | |
| Democratic | Kenya Handy-Hilliard | 9 | 5,620 | 29.5% | |
| Democratic | Edwin Raymond | 8 | 2,265 | 10.9% | |
| Democratic | Cecilia Cortez | 8 | 2,221 | 10.7% | |
| Democratic | Blake Morris | 7 | 1,368 | 6.5% | |
| Democratic | Maxi Eugene | 6 | 1,175 | 5.4% | |
| Democratic | Harriet Hines | 5 | 817 | 3.7% | |
| Democratic | John Williams | 4 | 705 | 3.2% | |
| Democratic | Vivia Morgan | 3 | 428 | 1.9% | |
| Democratic | Victor Jordan | 2 | 344 | 1.5% | |
| Write-in | | 1 | 60 | 0.3% | |

An interactive map of District 40

2021 New York City Council election, District 40 general election
| Party | Candidate | Votes | % |
|---|---|---|---|
| Democratic | Rita Joseph | 19,854 | 93.0 |
| Republican | Constantine Jean-Pierre | 1,207 | |
| Conservative | Constantine Jean-Pierre | 235 | |
| Total | Constantine Jean-Pierre | 1,442 | 6.8 |
| Write-in | | 37 | 0.2 |
| Total votes | | 21,333 | 100 |
| Democratic hold | | | |

=== 2017 ===
2017 New York City Council election, District 40
Primary election
| Party | Candidate | Votes | % |
|---|---|---|---|
| Democratic | Mathieu Eugene (incumbent) | 5,560 | 40.8 |
| Democratic | Brian-Christopher Cunningham | 4,103 | 30.1 |
| Democratic | Pia Raymond | 3,064 | 22.5 |
| Democratic | Jennifer Berkley | 877 | 6.4 |
| Write-in | | 19 | 0.1 |
| Total votes | | 13,623 | 100 |
General election
| Democratic | Mathieu Eugene (incumbent) | 14,609 | 60.5 |
| Reform | Brian-Christopher Cunningham | 8,701 | 36.0 |
| Conservative | Brian Kelly | 806 | 3.3 |
| Write-in | | 43 | 0.2 |
| Total votes | | 24,159 | 100 |
| Democratic hold | | | |

=== 2013 ===
2013 New York City Council election, District 40
Primary election
| Party | Candidate | Votes | % |
|---|---|---|---|
| Democratic | Mathieu Eugene (incumbent) | 6,210 | 47.9 |
| Democratic | Saundra Thomas | 4,862 | 37.5 |
| Democratic | Sylvia Kinard | 1,359 | 10.5 |
| Democratic | John Grant | 538 | 4.1 |
| Write-in | | 5 | 0.0 |
| Total votes | | 12,974 | 100 |
General election
| Democratic | Mathieu Eugene | 17,280 | |
| Working Families | Mathieu Eugene | 1,219 | |
| Total | Mathieu Eugene (incumbent) | 18,499 | 89.9 |
| Rent Is Too Damn High | Sylvia Kinard | 1,260 | 6.1 |
| Conservative | Brian Kelly | 772 | 3.8 |
| Write-in | | 51 | 0.2 |
| Total votes | | 20,582 | 100 |
| Democratic hold | | | |
