= Mathieu Eugene =

American politician

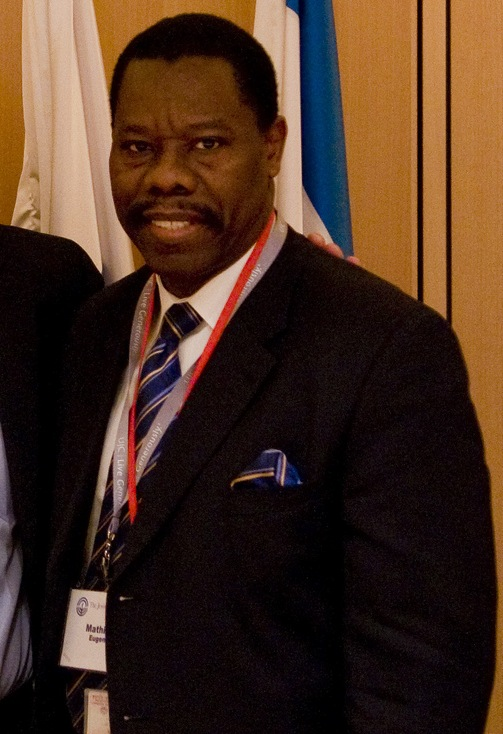

Member of the New York City Council from the 40th district
- In office April 25, 2007 – December 31, 2021
- Preceded by: Yvette Clarke
- Succeeded by: Rita Joseph

Personal details
- Born: April 26, 1953 (age 73) Cap-Haïtien, Haiti
- Party: Democratic
- Website: Official website

Mathieu Eugene (born April 26, 1953) is a Haitian-American politician. A Democrat, he was a New York City Councilmember for the 40th district, and was the first Haitian-born city councilmember.

His district included portions of Crown Heights, East Flatbush, Flatbush, Kensington, Midwood, Prospect Park and Prospect Lefferts Gardens in Brooklyn.

== Life and career ==
Eugene is a Haitian-American, born in Cap-Haïtien in April 1954.

He is also a physician, having attended medical school in Belgium, the Dominican Republic, and Mexico.

He claims to have a medical degree from Universidad del Noreste in Mexico but there is no record of him practicing in the U.S.

Before he became a City Council member, he described himself as a community organizer.

=== New York City Council ===
In 2006, Councilwoman Yvette Clarke resigned following her election to the United States Congress. In the special election to replace her, Eugene won both the non-partisan primary and the general election. Eugene is the first Haitian-born elected official in the state of New York.

Eugene was re-elected in 2009, 2013, and 2017. He ran for Brooklyn Borough President in 2020 and endorsed his relative Maxi Eugene to succeed him in city council.

In an effort to be elected Brooklyn Borough President in 2020, Eugene prioritized special interest groups outside of his district and disbursed funds intended for council district 40 elsewhere. An investigation by The Haitian Times found that Eugene gave over $946,000 in discretionary funds to groups outside District 40 in FY2020, compared to $298,600 to organizations located within district 40.

A City & State analysis found that in 14 years in the city council, he was the primary sponsor of only 141 pieces of legislation: 78 of those were “resolutions” —effectively non-binding statements with little impact on city operations. Of the remaining 63 sponsored “introductions,” or proposed changes to local law, only 11 were enacted in 14 years.

== Personal life ==
Eugene is a practicing Catholic.

He is a black belt in the martial art of Taekwondo.

== Electoral history ==
Election history
Location	Year	Election	Results
NYC Council District 40	2007	Special Primary	√ Mathieu Eugene (D) 51.30% Harry L. Schiffman (D) 24.70% Wellington Sharpe (D) 22.99%
NYC Council District 40	2007	Special	√ Mathieu Eugene (D) 90.29% Clarence John (R) 9.71%
NYC Council District 40	2009	Democratic primary	√ Mathieu Eugene 59.41% L. Rickie Tulloch 23.52% Rock Hermon Hackshaw 17.07%
NYC Council District 40	2009	General	√ Mathieu Eugene (D) 94.12% Noel Burke (L) 2.99% Hugh C. Carr (Conservative) 2.88%
NYC Council District 40	2013	Democratic primary	√ Mathieu Eugene 47.88% Saundra Thomas 37.49% Sylvia G. Kinard 10.48% John E. Grant 4.15%
NYC Council District 40	2013	General	√ Mathieu Eugene (D) 89.88% Sylvia G. Kinard (Rent Is Too Damn High) 6.12% Brian W. Kelly (Conservative)
NYC Council District 40	2017	Democratic primary	√ Mathieu Eugene 40.81% Brian-Christopher Cunningham 30.12% Pia Raymond 22.49% Jennifer Berkley 6.44%
NYC Council District 40	2017	General	√ Mathieu Eugene (D) 60.47% Brian-Christopher Cunningham (Reform) 36.01% Brian W. Kelly (Conservative) 3.34%

Civic offices
Preceded by Yvette Clarke	New York City Council, 40th district 2007–2022	Succeeded by Rita Joseph
