= Wingate, Brooklyn =

Neighborhood in New York City

- Interactive map of Wingate, Brooklyn
- Country: United States
- State: New York
- City: New York City
- Borough: Brooklyn
- Founder: Farrel Meltzer
- Named for: George Wood Wingate
- Time zone: UTC−05:00 (Eastern (EST))
  - Summer (DST): UTC−04:00 (Eastern (EDT))
- Area codes: 718/347/929 and 917

Wingate is a neighborhood in the north central portion of the New York City borough of Brooklyn. The area is bordered by Prospect Lefferts Gardens to the west, Crown Heights to the north and east, and East Flatbush to the south. Wingate is bounded by Empire Boulevard to the north, Troy Avenue to the east, Winthrop Street to the south, and New York Avenue to the west. The area is part of Brooklyn Community District 9. It is sometimes considered part of Crown Heights, East Flatbush, and/or Prospect Lefferts Gardens.

The neighborhood was originally named Pigtown because it was the location of several major pig farms that supplied Brooklyn. Pigtown was at the southern periphery of the City of Brooklyn where it bordered the Town of Flatbush. On modern maps it is bounded on the north by Empire Boulevard (formerly Malbone Street), on the south by Midwood Street, on the east by Albany Avenue and on the west by Nostrand Avenue. Future drag racer Frederick DiNome and his criminal brother Richard DiNome were born and raised in Pigtown, as was Rudy Giuliani, who spent his first seven years there.

The neighborhood was renamed to Wingate in the 2000s by real estate developers, named for the park and the now-defunct George W. Wingate High School, locally called "The Banjo School" because of its shape.
