= Karl Davis =

African-American fashion designer

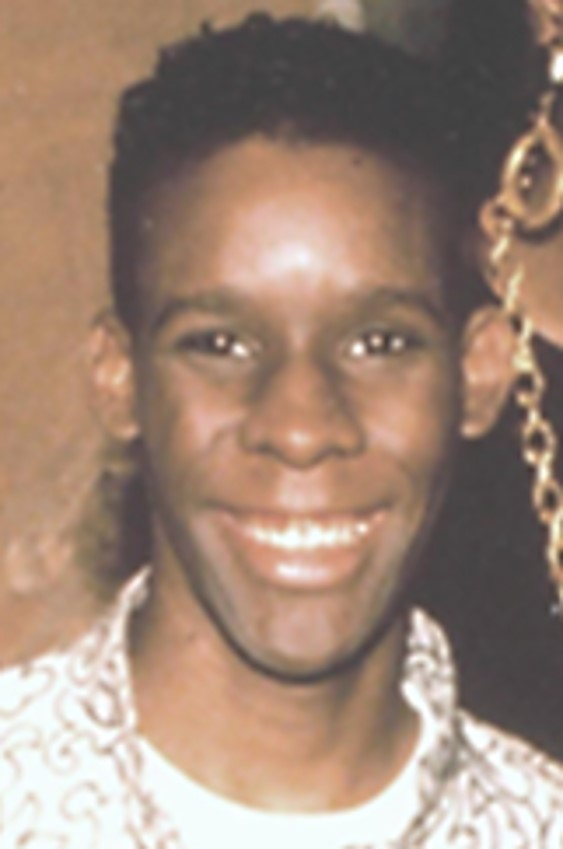
- Born: January 17, 1962; Brooklyn, New York
- Died: May 2, 1987 (aged 25); Brooklyn, New York
- Occupation: Fashion designer

Karl Davis (January 17, 1962 – May 2, 1987) was an African-American fashion designer once called one of New York's most promising young designers. Davis had six major collections, the last shown at the Manhattan restaurant Caffe Roma.

== Beginnings ==
Davis' designer files at the Fashion Institute of Technology’s research library reveal that a friend's mother taught him how to sew when he was a teenager, and he made pleated slacks for the first time when he was 15.

Davis graduated from Brooklyn's George W. Wingate High School in August 1980. At age 17, he left Brooklyn and began his designing career.

Davis attended the Fashion Institute of Technology in New York for one semester, where he studied pattern making. He then worked as an assistant to Carol Fertig and a freelance design assistant to Bill Blass. While Davis was working as a design assistant, he sold his first styles to Henri Bendel.

In 1984, Davis established his own collection, initially financed by his mother, Rose.

== Fashion designer ==
From age 17 until shortly before his death at age 25, Davis received high praise as a fashion designer.

Newsweek (August 10, 1987) observed that Davis created an exclusive line of classic women’s clothing. New York Newsday (May 4, 1986) described his clothing, as grown-up clothes, not for those on a tight budget.

New York Magazine (September 17, 1987) stated, "ladies dressed in Davis-designed wardrobes would look strong, confident, and elegant! Not to mention, in many instances, frankly sexy."

Fashion columnists of the Dallas Morning News (December 18, 1985) reported that Davis’s work was strongly influenced by the great masters of couture, that Davis managed to move forward adding his own signature of modern minimalism, and that his approach to fashion and business were in remarkable contrast to his age.

Taxi (November 1986) quoted Davis: "Most people would rather spend money on flashy clothes that scream and spell ‘expensive’, rather than purchasing understated elegant garments".

Taxi Magazine (November 1986) commented that being young and having no financial backing did not intimidate Davis from creating couture clothing of the highest level, that respect should be paid to Davis and fashion magazines should acknowledge him and take the initiative to put him on the map, and that a lady dressed in Davis’s clothes would not only be taken seriously but would be praised for her good taste and silent elegance — daring to detach herself from the uniforms of a working machine. Taxi quoted Davis: "I love what I’m doing – making women look like women again! The lady I sell to is dressed femininely and still gains respect on a business level." Taxi further observed that a customer from Henri Bendel would never suspect that the dress she just purchased was from a young designer who supported himself by making bagel sandwiches in a downtown coffee shop. Davis did prepare sandwiches at "Tamala Designs With Bagel" (153 Prince Street) - a SoHo clothing store with a food counter in the back owned by Aggie Markowitz. Markowitz said "[Karl] was an integral part of the downtown fashion mafia. He gave fashion commentary while he sort of made bagel sandwiches. The commentary usually came faster than the food".

Prêt (May 1986) said Davis was beginning to shake up the New York fashion scene with his elegant, dramatic cuts and sophisticated sense of style; that his designs were inspired by the looks of Dior, Balenciaga and Chanel; and that he took a modern approach to the values and attitudes of Haute Couture and reinvented them for a new, younger generation. Prêt additionally observed that Davis chose to work with very basic shapes and inject something hidden or unexpected into them which Davis described as "classic with a twist"; that he focused primarily on playing up and enhancing the feminine form; and that to further emphasize his attention to shape, he - with a keen focus on the waist and hips for both day and evening wear - tended to stay away from loud prints and patterns and designs.

In December 1985, Davis found a backer and traveled to Europe. Both significantly impacted his May 1986 showing "Karl Davis Fall 1986 Collection."

New York Newsday (24 August 1986) declared Davis to be "New York’s new crown prince of near couture".

Karl Davis designs, priced at $80 to $500 wholesale, were sold In New York at Henri Bendel [which continued to be his major outlet], Bergdorf Goodman, Grand Hotel, Le Piccole, and Suzie's [Great Neck, NY]; in Dallas and Houston at Neiman Marcus; and in San Francisco at I. Magnin. Davis also created clothes for private clients.

Davis continued designing until April 1987, the month before his death.

== Fashion shows ==
April 22, 1984: [Davis's] Fall Collection shown during "New American Designers Show" at Club Area [157 Hudson Street] which fashion-commentator Tavy Stone reported to be "real clothes ... good stuff" in her Detroit News (April 29, 1984) "What's New" column.

Fall 1984: Designs shown during fashion presentation at Visage Discotheque [610 W. 56 Street]

January 14, 1985: "Spring/Summer 1985 is Karl Davis" at Parsons School of Design [Seventh Avenue @ 40th Street]

August 5, 1985: "Fall/Holiday '85 Collection" ("Karl Davis Presents Haute Couture R.T.W. ‘85") shown at White Columns [325 Spring Street] which was video-recorded in its entirety along with a post-show interview of Davis by Cable News Network's "Style with Elsa Klensch".

November 6, 1985: [Davis's] designs shown during "Fashion Aid" benefit for Ethiopian famine relief at Palladium Discotheque [126 E. 14th Street] which was video-recorded by Ohlmeyer Communications Companies and from which the New York Times cited Davis's white crepe de chine gown,

May 1, 1986: "Karl Davis Fall 1986 Collection" – his sixth and last formal collection — shown at Caffe Roma, a Manhattan restaurant [3 W. 18th Street]

== Personal style ==
In 1980, Davis was voted "Best Dressed Male" of his George-Wingate-High-School graduating class.

In the feature article "Karl Davis: A New, Up-and-Coming Designer Who Enjoys Dressing Up," Mr. High Fashion (September 1986), columnist Yoko Hamada stated, "Although many designers dress well, it's hard to find someone who loves dressing up as much as Karl. He is very fond of fashion: it’s as if he was born to enjoy wearing clothes. The clothes he wears are not shockingly avant-garde or showy. Karl is a unique dresser whose taste is classic, as well as modern, neat and refined. He creates his tasteful and sophisticated look by skillfully combining brand name clothes, antiques, and ordinary garments."

== Illness and death ==
On May 2, 1987, Davis died of pneumonia at Brookdale Hospital Medical Center in Brooklyn, New York. Davis’s death was due to complications from HIV/AIDS.

In her December 8, 1987 Wall Street Journal article "Designer Deaths: AIDS Is Decimating The Fashion Business . . .", reporter Carol Hymowitz cites - along with fellow designers Perry Ellis, Chester Weinberg, Willi Smith, Tracy Mills, and Mark Pennywell - ". . . budding talent Karl Davis, who created a line of classic women's clothing . . ." as among the enormous toll of other talents in the fashion business succumbing to an alarming surge in HIV/AIDS-related casualties.

Funeral services for Davis were held on May 7, 1987 at St. Mary’s Church of Christ in Brooklyn, New York, followed by interment at Cypress Hills Cemetery.

Davis was survived by his parents, Rose and Lembert Davis of Brooklyn, and three sisters, Jackie and Robin, both of Brooklyn, and Andora Boyd of Virginia.
