= Lefferts Manor Historic District =

Historic district in Brooklyn, New York

- U.S. National Register of Historic Places
- U.S. Historic district
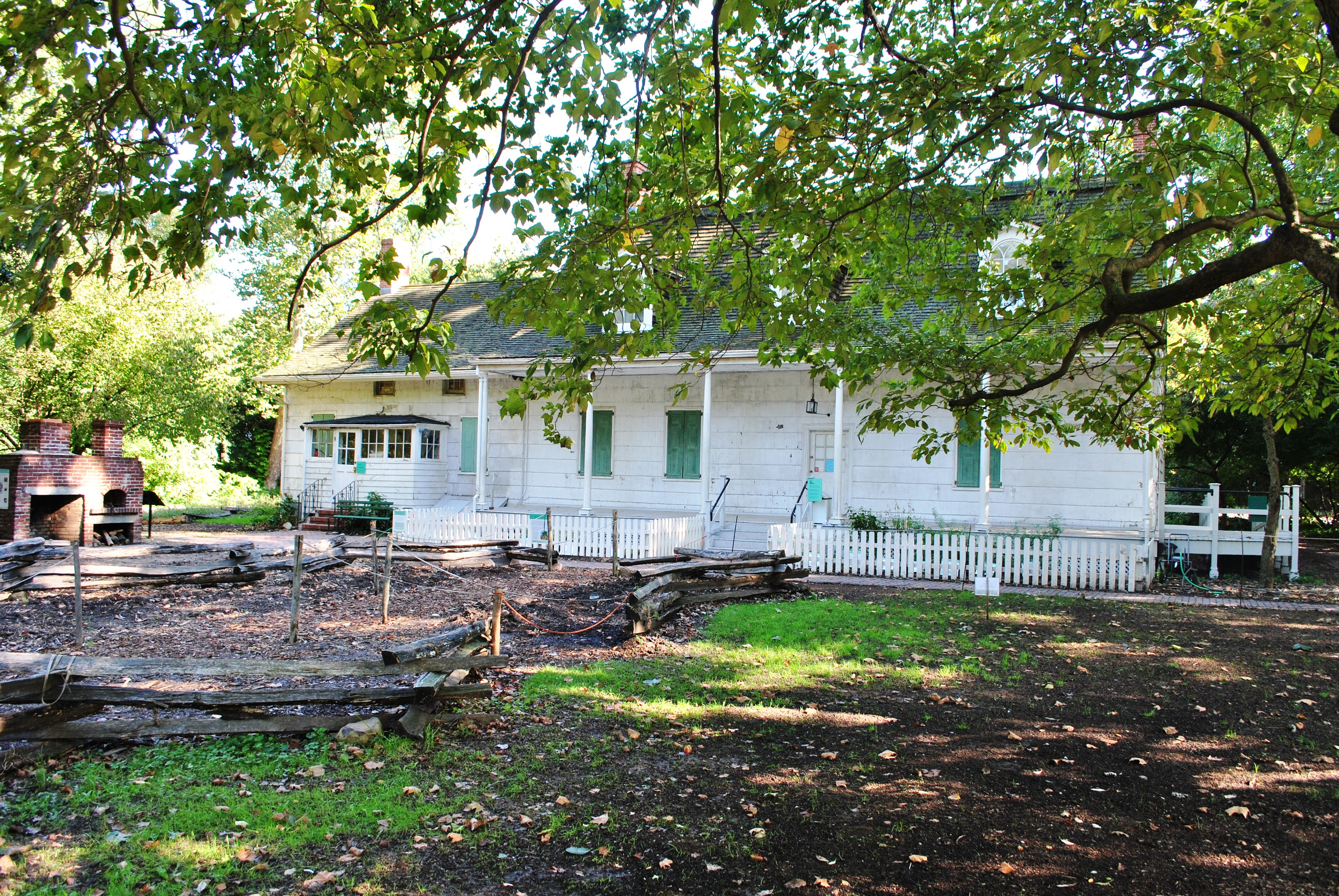
- House in the Lefferts Manor Historic District, October 2011

- Location within New York City Location within New York Location within the United States
- Location: Roughly bounded by Lincoln Rd., Fenimore St., Rogers Ave. and Flatbush Ave., Brooklyn, New York
- Coordinates: 40°39′26″N 73°57′26″W
- Area: 45 acres (18 ha)
- Built: 1896
- Architect: Multiple
- Architectural style: Late 19th And 20th Century Revivals
- NRHP reference No.: 83004872 (original); 100001801 (increase)

Significant dates
- Added to NRHP: May 18, 1992
- Boundary increase: November 9, 2017

Lefferts Manor Historic District is a national historic district in Prospect Lefferts Gardens, Brooklyn, New York City. It consists of 667 contributing buildings and one contributing site (the elaborate garden at 95 Maple), which were built between 1896 and 1952 on the subdivision established by James Lefferts in 1896. It consists entirely of single-family residential buildings, most of which are stone, brick, or brick and stone rowhouses. The district also includes a number of free-standing frame and masonry residences and garages.

It was listed on the National Register of Historic Places in 1992, with a boundary increase in 2017.
