= Una S. T. Clarke =

American politician (born 1934)

Una Clarke
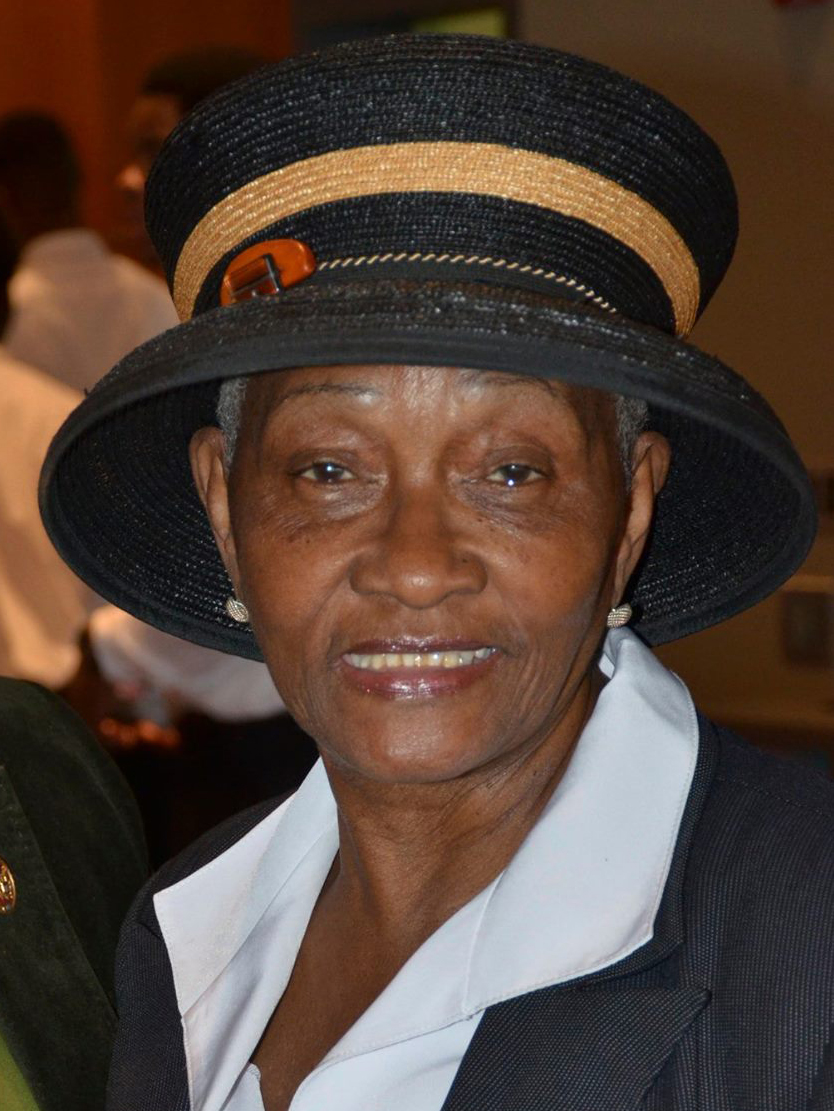
- Clarke in 2014

Member of the New York City Council from the 40th district
- In office January 1, 1992 – December 31, 2001
- Preceded by: Constituency established
- Succeeded by: Yvette Clarke

Personal details
- Born: December 2, 1934 (age 90) Saint Elizabeth Parish, Jamaica
- Political party: Democratic
- Spouse: Lesley Clarke
- Children: Yvette Clarke
- Education: Long Island University (BS); New York University (MEd)

Una S. T. Clarke (born December 2, 1934) is an American politician who served in the New York City Council from the 40th district from 1992 to 2001. She is the mother of New York congresswoman Yvette Clarke, who was first elected in 2006 and represents New York's 9th congressional district.
