= George Wood Wingate =

Union Army soldier (1840–1928)

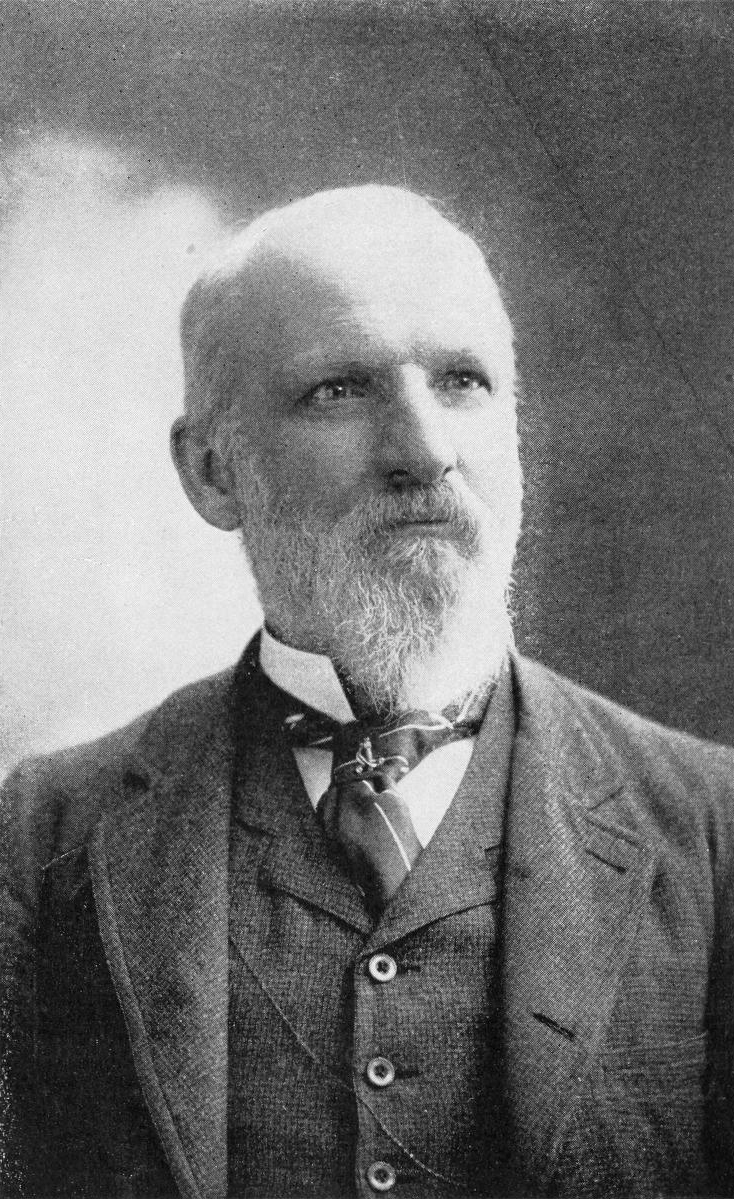
- Wingate in 1904

President of the National Rifle Association of America
- In office 1886–1900

Personal details
- Born: July 1, 1840 New York City, New York, U.S.
- Died: March 22, 1928 (aged 87) Brooklyn, New York, U.S.
- Spouse: Susan Prudence Mann
- Relatives: George A. Wingate (son)

Military service
- Allegiance: United States
- Branch/service: Union Army; New York National Guard
- Rank: Brigadier general
- Battles/wars: American Civil War

George Wood Wingate (July 1, 1840 – March 22, 1928) was an American lawyer, soldier, civil servant and organizer of rifle practice. During the Civil War he served in the New York National Guard which later encouraged him to promote marksmanship skills for American citizens. He was the co-founder, and later president, of the National Rifle Association of America.

== Biography ==
George Wood Wingate was born to Charles and Mary Wingate on July 1, 1840 in New York City. He studied at the New York Free Academy and worked at a law office from an early age. He studied law and was admitted to the bar in 1861, later establishing the firm Wingate & Cullen in 1864.

After the outbreak of the Civil War, Wingate joined the 2nd Regiment New York State Militia Infantry which mustered into volunteer service as the 82nd New York Volunteer Infantry Regiment, entering as a private and eventually rising to the rank of captain. In Wingate's experience, he noticed that many Union soldiers lacked basic marksmanship skills which motivated him to promote rifle proficiency among Americans. In 1874 he was made general inspector of the New York National Guard and was given the rank of Brigadier general. In this role he oversaw a new rifle training program that was used in the state as well as writing shooting manuals which would be used by the United States Army, eventually retiring from his position in 1879.

Wingate also sought to promote marksmanship skills to American citizens through instructional classes and shooting competitions. Together with editor and Union veteran William Conant Church, Wingate chartered the National Rifle Association of America in New York on November 17, 1871. General Ambrose Burnside served as the first president of the organization with Wingate acting as the first secretary. The group sought to “promote and encourage rifle shooting on a scientific basis" and Wingate sent emissaries to Canada, Germany and England to observe the training regiments of their militaries.

Working with the New York legislature, Wingate was able to appropriate funds for the purchase of 70 acres of farmland in Long Island, which the NRA intended to construct a shooting range on. The Creedmoor Rifle Range was officially opened on June 21, 1873.

Wingate eventually became the president of the NRA, serving in that role until 1900. Wingate also took up a correspondence with Theodore Roosevelt, himself a supporter and member of the NRA. In a letter dated October 5, 1914, Roosevelt endorsed Wingate's organization of rifle clubs in America.

== Other work ==
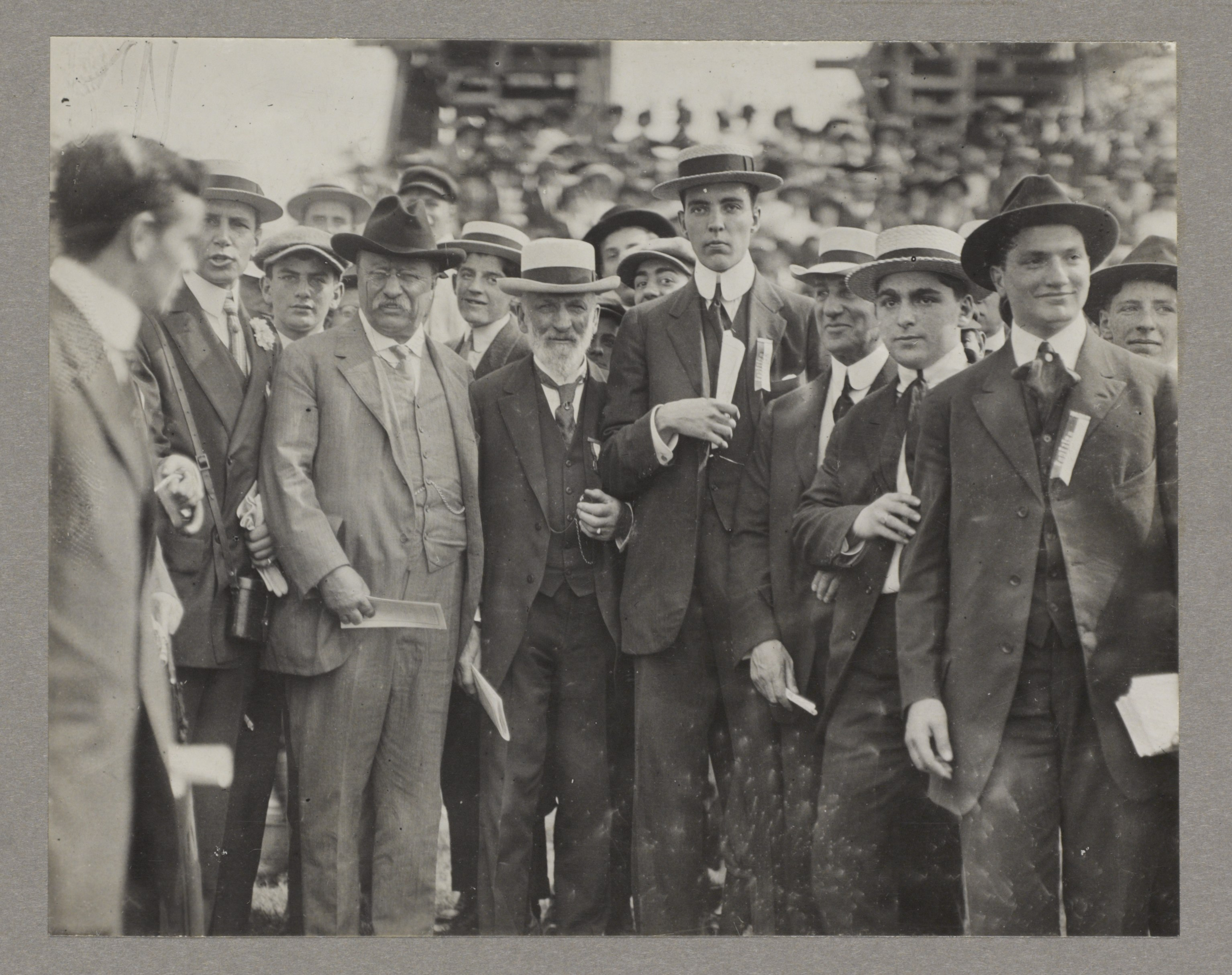
George Wingate (center) along with Theodore Roosevelt at a Public Schools Athletic meet in Central Park, New York City, 1913.

George Wingate also sought to promote athletics in schools and in 1903 contributed funds for the Public Schools Athletic League. Wingate was the leagues first president and would go on to serve in that position for over 25 years. Today, the PSAL is funded by the New York City Board of Education. However, as recently as 2003, The PSAL Wingate Fund continued its traditions of honoring former and present PSAL athletes.

== Legacy ==
Both Wingate Park and the Brooklyn neighborhood Wingate are named after him.

George W. Wingate High School, a now closed public high school in the East Flatbush neighborhood of Brooklyn, was named for Wingate. The campus is now home to several schools in the New York City Public School system. The campus's sports teams are known as the 'Generals', for Wingate's rank in the New York National Guard. The General GW Wingate Athletic Field in the Midwood neighborhood of Brooklyn is named for him. The naming was in recognition of Wingate's role in founding, and long service as the first President of the Public Schools Athletic League.

Military offices
Preceded by William T. Sherman	Commanding General of the United States Army; 1886–1900	Succeeded by John M. Schofield
National Rifle Association of America
Preceded by Philip Sheridan	President of the NRA; 1885	Succeeded by Bird W. Spencer
