= George W. Wingate High School =

Public school in New York City

Coordinates: 40°39′31″N 73°56′38″W

- New York City, New York; United States

Information
- Established: 1956
- Closed: June 2006
- Language: English
- Campus type: Comprehensive high school

George W. Wingate High School is a defunct comprehensive high school in the East Flatbush and Wingate neighborhoods of Brooklyn, New York City. It opened in 1956 and was closed down in June 2006 due to poor academic performance. The school was then divided into four small schools. The school was named for George Wood Wingate, an officer in the Union Army during the American Civil War. Wingate was the founder of the Public School Athletic League in New York City.

The campus now houses four new small schools under the New Visions for Public Schools initiative of the New York City Department of Education (NYCDOE). There are the International Arts Business School, The School for Human Rights, The School for Democracy and Leadership and the High School for Public Service: Heroes of Tomorrow.

The high school's sports teams were known as the 'Generals', for George Wingate's rank in the New York National Guard.

== Notable alumni ==
- Frank Tepedino, Major League Baseball player
- Barbara Boxer, United States Senator (D–CA)
- Marty Markowitz, Brooklyn Borough President, 2001-2013
- Roger Brown, ABA basketball player for the Indiana Pacers. Elected to Indianapolis City Council.
- Steve Rubell, co-owner Studio 54, NYC
- M.C. Lyte, hip-hop music rapper, TV and film actress, radio show host.
- Rodney Batiste, U.S. Karate Middleweight champion, World Karate Champion
- Karl Davis, African-American fashion designer
- Bethann Hardison, American fashion model and activist
