= George A. Wingate =

US Army major general

- Wingate in 1919
- Born: 24 February 1871; Brooklyn, New York, US
- Died: 2 April 1955 (aged 84); Brooklyn, New York, US
- Burial place: Friends Quaker Cemetery, Brooklyn, New York, US
- Education: Brooklyn Collegiate and Polytechnic Institute; New York Law School
- Spouse: Maude Coquelette Lamb (m. 1899–1950)
- Relatives: George Wood Wingate (father)
- Military career
- Service: United States Army; New York National Guard; Organized Reserve Corps
- Service years: 1889–1935
- Rank: Major General
- Unit: US Army Field Artillery Branch
- Commands: 2nd New York Field Artillery Regiment; 1st New York Field Artillery Regiment; 105th Field Artillery Regiment; 52nd Field Artillery Brigade
- Wars: Mexican Border War; World War I
- Awards: Army Distinguished Service Medal; New York State Conspicuous Service Cross
- Other work: Attorney; Judge

George Albert Wingate (24 February 1871 – 2 April 1955) was a military officer, attorney, and judge from Brooklyn, New York. A longtime member of the New York National Guard, he attained the rank of major general and his commands included the 105th Field Artillery Regiment and 52nd Field Artillery Brigade. A veteran of the Mexican Border War and World War I, his awards included the Army Distinguished Service Medal for his First World War service. In his civilian career, Wingate practiced law and was the longtime judge of the Kings County surrogate's court.

== Early life and civilian career ==
George A. Wingate was born in Brooklyn, New York on 24 February 1871, a son of George Wood Wingate and Susan Prudence (Man) Wingate. He attended the public schools of Brooklyn, including P.S. 41. He then studied at the Brooklyn Collegiate and Polytechnic Institute, from which he graduated in 1890. Wingate went on to New York Law School, from which he received his LL.B. degree in 1893. (Note: In June 1931, New York Law School awarded Wingate the honorary degree of LL.D.) He was admitted to the bar later that year, after which he practiced in Brooklyn.

In 1899, Wingate married Maude Coquelette Lamb of Brooklyn. They were married until her death in 1950 and had no children. Wingate was a Democrat in politics, and in April 1919 Governor Al Smith appointed him to fill a vacancy on the Kings County surrogate's court. He subsequently won election and re-election to the position, and served until retiring in December 1941.

== Start of military career ==
In March 1889, Wingate began his military career by enlisting as a private in the New York National Guard's Company D, 23rd Infantry Regiment. He quickly advanced through Company D's ranks with promotions to corporal, sergeant and first sergeant, then received appointment as the regimental sergeant major. In November 1895, Wingate was appointed a first lieutenant and he was promoted to captain in May 1896. In January 1899, Wingate was assigned as aide-de-camp to Governor Theodore Roosevelt, and he served in this position until 1901.

After his service on Roosevelt's military staff, Wingate was assigned as an assistant adjutant on the staff of the Adjutant General of New York, and he received promotion to lieutenant colonel in March 1903. He served in this position until May 1912, when he was promoted to colonel and assigned to command the 2nd New York Field Artillery Regiment. He commanded the 1st New York Field Artillery from October 1912 until January 2013, when he resumed command of the 2nd New York Field Artillery. In June 1916, Wingate's regiment was federalized during the Mexican Border War, and he commanded first in McAllen, Texas and later at Monte Christo, near the Texas town of Doolittle. He returned to New York with the 2nd New York Field Artillery in December 2016. Wingate was a graduate of the school for field grade officers at Fort Sam Houston, Texas and the US Army Field Artillery School's School of Fire at Fort Sill, Oklahoma.

== Continued military career ==
American entry into World War I occurred in April 1917 and in June, Wingate and the 2nd New York Field Artillery were activated for overseas service and federalized as the 105th Field Artillery Regiment, a unit of the 27th Infantry Division. The division trained at Camp Wadsworth, South Carolina until June 1918, when it departed for combat in Europe. In April 1918, Wingate was promoted to brigadier general and assigned to command the 52nd Field Artillery Brigade. Upon arrival in France, he attended the course at the Camp de Souge Field Artillery Training School near Bordeaux. He went on to lead his brigade during the Battle of Saint-Mihiel and the Meuse–Argonne offensive and he remained in command until the Armistice of November 11, 1918 ended the war. Wingate received the Army Distinguished Service Medal and New York State Conspicuous Service Cross in recognition of his superior wartime service.

=== Distinguished Service Medal citation ===
The President of the United States of America, authorized by Act of Congress, July 9, 1918, takes pleasure in presenting the Army Distinguished Service Medal to Brigadier General George Albert Wingate, United States Army, for exceptionally meritorious and distinguished services to the Government of the United States, in a duty of great responsibility during World War I. In Command of the 52d Field Artillery Brigade, 27th Division, General Wingate served with marked distinction in the St. Mihiel operation, displaying military attainments of a high order. In the Meuse-Argonne offensive he proved himself possessed of exceptional tactical ability, working with untiring energy that the Infantry might have all the advantages of Artillery support. With sound judgment, unusual foresight, and wide comprehension of conditions and facilities available, he conducted operations in that offensive with brilliant success, repeatedly solving the difficult problems incident thereto.

Service: United States Army Rank: Brigadier General Regiment: 52d Field Artillery Brigade Division: 27th Division, American Expeditionary Forces Action Date: World War I Orders: War Department, General Orders No. 126 (1919)

== Later military career ==
Wingate returned to the United States in early 1919 and resumed his career with the Organized Reserve Corps. In this role, he frequently took part in training evaluations, inspections, awards presentations, and other activities. On 16 February 1935, with Wingate's military retirement imminent, his decades of military service were commended with promotion to National Guard major general. He held this rank for eight days until reaching the mandatory retirement age of 64 on 24 February 1935.

== Later life ==
In January 1942, Wingate received the Downtown Brooklyn Association Medal to recognize his contributions to the borough's civic life. His professional association memberships included the New York State Bar Association, Brooklyn Bar Association, Rotary Club, and Brooklyn Chamber of Commerce. He also belonged to several legacy societies, including the Sons of the Revolution, Grand Army of the Republic, and Sons of Union Veterans of the Civil War. He was also a member of the American Legion, US Field Artillery Association, Military Order of Foreign Wars, Military Order of the World War, and 27th Division Association. He also belonged to the 105th Field Artillery Officers' Association, 23rd Regiment Officers' Association, 2nd Field Artillery Veterans' Association, New York National Guard Memorial Association, and Forty and Eight.

Additional memberships Wingate maintained included the Society of American Officers, American Flag Association, and West Point Army Athletic Council. Civic organizations and associations in Brooklyn with which Wingate was affiliated included the Boy Scouts of America, American Red Cross, and Elks. He was also affiliated with the National Geographic Society, New England Society, Polytechnic Preparatory Alumni Association, and Public Schools Athletic League. During World War II, Wingate took part in activities to support the US effort, including fundraising drives for the United Service Organizations. He also maintained his interest in Democratic politics; in 1942, he was a member of the veterans committee that supported John J. Bennett Jr.'s campaign for governor. Wingate died in Brooklyn on 2 April 1955. He was buried at Friends Quaker Cemetery in Brooklyn.

== Dates of rank ==
Wingate's dates of rank were:

- Private, 18 March 1889
- Corporal, 10 February 1890
- Sergeant, 11 November 1892
- First Sergeant, 22 May 1893
- Sergeant Major, 17 September 1894
- First Lieutenant, 11 November 1895
- Captain, 22 May 1896
- Lieutenant Colonel, 28 March 1903
- Colonel, 25 June 1912
- Brigadier General, 12 April 1918
- Major General, 16 February 1935
- Major General (Retired), 24 February 1935
