= Yvette Clarke =

American politician (born 1964)

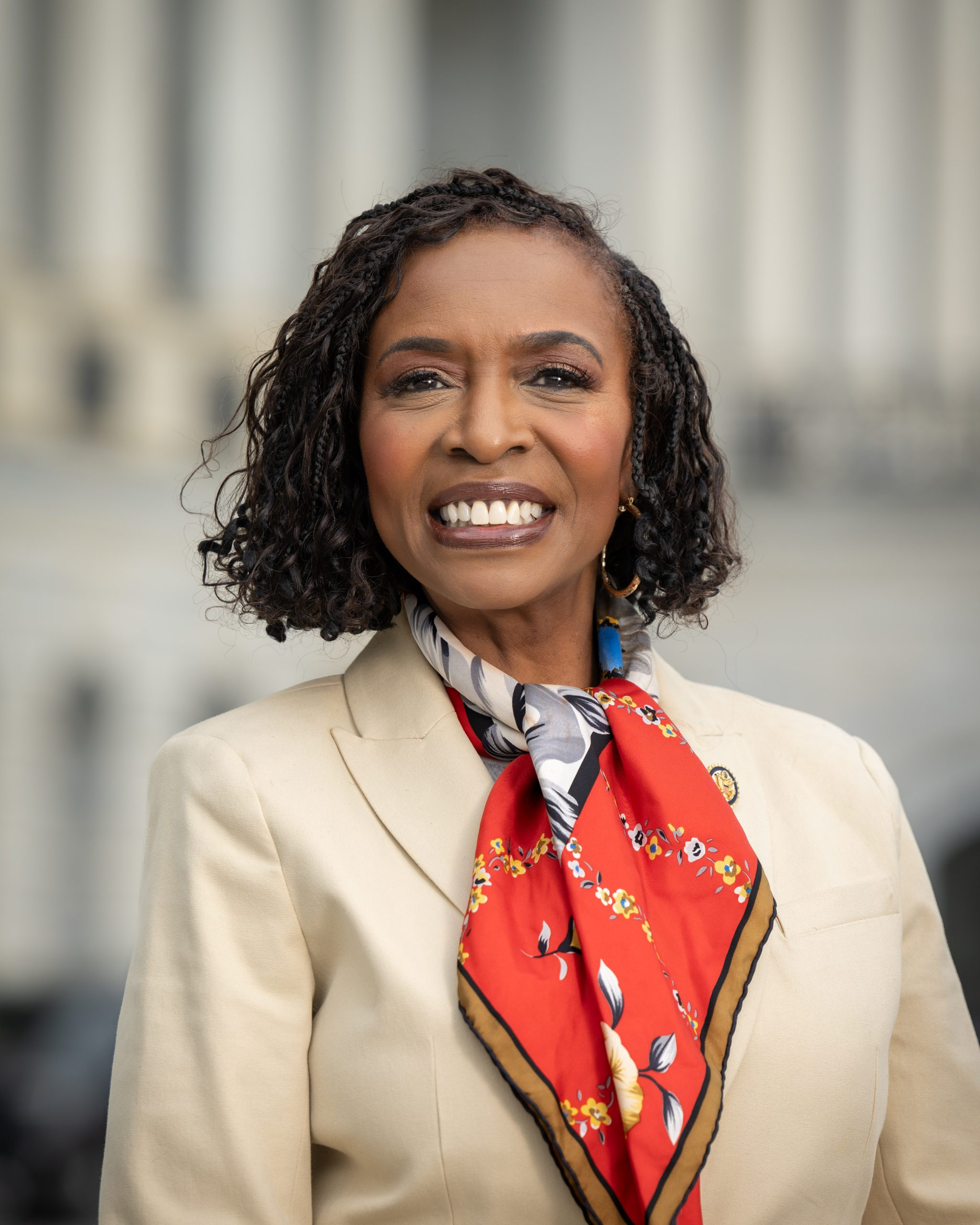
- Official portrait, 2026

Chair of the Congressional Black Caucus
- Incumbent
- Assumed office January 3, 2025
- Preceded by: Steven Horsford

Member of the U.S. House of Representatives from New York
- Incumbent
- Assumed office January 3, 2007
- Preceded by: Major Owens
- Constituency: 9th district (2013–present); 11th district (2007–2013)

Member of the New York City Council from the 40th district
- In office January 1, 2002 – December 31, 2006
- Preceded by: Una S. T. Clarke
- Succeeded by: Mathieu Eugene

Personal details
- Born: Yvette Diane Clarke; November 21, 1964 (age 62) New York City, New York, U.S.
- Party: Democratic
- Relatives: Una S. T. Clarke (mother)
- Education: Oberlin College (attended); Medgar Evers College (attended)
- Website: House website Campaign website
- Clarke's voice Clarke on Women's History Month. Recorded March 22, 2023

Yvette Diane Clarke (born November 21, 1964) is an American politician representing New York's 9th congressional district in the U.S. House of Representatives. First elected to Congress in 2006, she initially represented New York's 11th congressional district from 2007 to 2013, before transitioning to the 9th district following redistricting. Previously, Clarke represented the 40th district in Brooklyn on the New York City Council from 2002 to 2006. She is a member of the Democratic Party, the Congressional Progressive Caucus and the Congressional Black Caucus.

== Early life and education ==
Clarke was born in Flatbush, Brooklyn, on November 21, 1964, to Lesley Clarke and former city councilwoman Una Clarke, both immigrants from Jamaica. She graduated from Edward R. Murrow High School and earned a scholarship to enroll at Oberlin College in Ohio, which she attended from 1982 to 1986. While studying at Oberlin, she spent a summer interning in the Washington, D.C. office of Representative Major Owens, where she told Roll Call that she worked on legislative issues involving Caribbean-American trade.

In August 2006, Crain's New York Business and the Daily News reported that Clarke's Oberlin transcripts indicated that she had not graduated, contrary to what her campaign literature claimed. Clarke initially said she thought she had earned sufficient credits to graduate from Oberlin, then later said she had completed her degree by attending courses at Medgar Evers College. In 2011, Clarke suggested that she planned to finish her degree at Oberlin by completing independent academic projects.

== Early career ==
Before entering politics, Clarke worked as a childcare specialist and trained community residents to care for the children of working parents. Later, she served as an assistant to State Senator Velmanette Montgomery of Brooklyn and Assemblywoman Barbara Clark, of Queens. Clarke also worked as director of business development for the Bronx Overall Economic Development Corporation and was the second director of the Bronx portion of the New York City Empowerment Zone.

=== New York City Council ===
Clarke was elected to the 40th district of the New York City Council in 2001. She succeeded her mother, former City Council member Una S. T. Clarke, who held the seat for more than a decade, making theirs the first mother-to-daughter succession in city council.

She cosponsored City Council resolutions that opposed the war in Iraq, criticized the federal USA PATRIOT Act, and called for a national moratorium on the death penalty. She was a frequent critic of the Bush administration's policies, and opposed budget cuts by Bush and Congress on several programs addressing women's rights and poverty. She later voted against extending provisions of the Patriot Act after the election of President Barack Obama.

- Committee on Contracts (chair)
  - Committee on Education
  - Committee on Fire and Criminal Justice Services
  - Committee on Health
  - Committee on Land Use
  - Committee on Planning, Dispositions and Concessions
  - Committee on Rules, Privileges and Elections

== U.S. House of Representatives ==
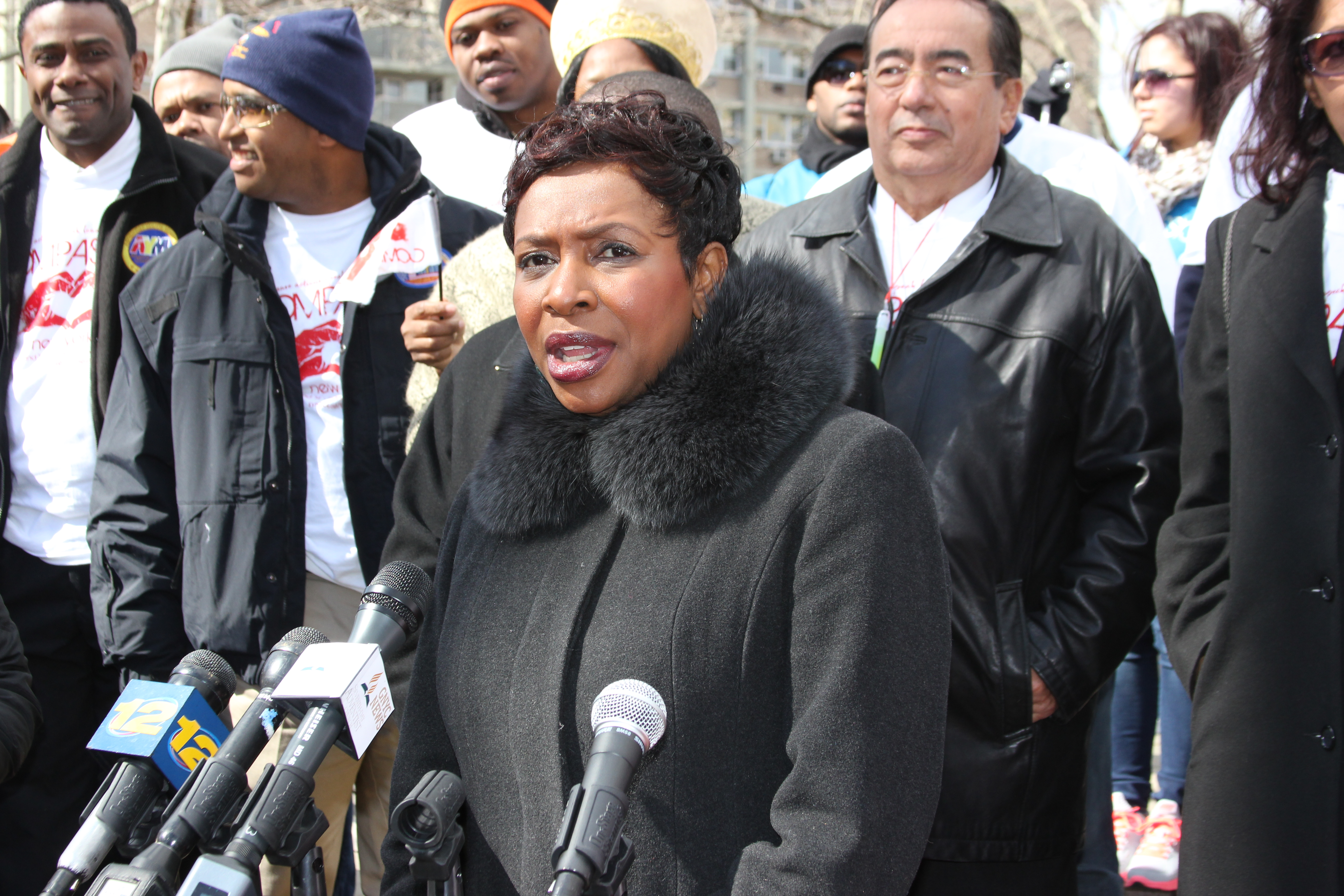
Clarke speaking at an anti-violence march in Brooklyn

=== District ===
Clarke's district, redrawn from the 11th in 2013, includes Sheepshead Bay, Gerritsen Beach, Brownsville, Crown Heights, East Flatbush, Flatbush, Kensington, Midwood, Prospect Heights, Prospect Lefferts Gardens and Park Slope.

=== Tenure ===
In April 2007, Clarke was the sole member of Congress to oppose a bill to rename the Ellis Island Library after British-born Bob Hope, saying in a statement, "Bob Hope is a great American and a fantastic human being, [but] I see the museum and all aspects of the island to be greater than any one human being."

On September 29, 2008, Clarke voted in support of HR 3997, the Emergency Economic Stability Act of 2008. The act failed, 205–228. She wrote legislation to improve the process of removing the names of individuals who believe they were wrongly identified as a threat when screened against the No Fly List used by the Transportation Security Administration, which passed 413–3 on February 3, 2009. In November 2009 she was one of 54 members of Congress to sign on to a controversial letter to President Obama, urging him to use diplomatic pressure to resolve the blockade affecting Gaza. On March 25, 2010, she introduced the International Cybercrime Reporting and Cooperation Act – H.R.4962.

Clarke supported the Prison Ship Martyrs' Monument Preservation Act (H.R. 1501; 113th Congress), a bill that would direct the Secretary of the Interior to study the suitability and feasibility of designating the Prison Ship Martyrs' Monument in Fort Greene Park in Brooklyn as a unit of the National Park System (NPS). Clarke argued the bill was a good idea because "this monument commemorates not only the sacrifices of soldiers in the Revolutionary War who dedicated themselves to the cause of liberty, but a reminder that even in wartime we must protect basic human rights. These thousands of deaths were an atrocity that should never occur again."

On September 17, 2013, Clarke introduced the Homeland Security Cybersecurity Boots-on-the-Ground Act (H.R. 3107; 113th Congress), a bill that would require the United States Department of Homeland Security (DHS) to undertake several actions designed to improve the readiness and capacity of DHS's cybersecurity workforce. DHS would also be required to create a strategy for recruiting and training additional cybersecurity employees.

=== Committee assignments ===
For the 119th Congress:

- Committee on Energy and Commerce
  - Subcommittee on Commerce, Manufacturing, and Trade
  - Subcommittee on Communications and Technology
  - Subcommittee on Oversight and Investigations (Ranking Member)

=== Caucus memberships ===
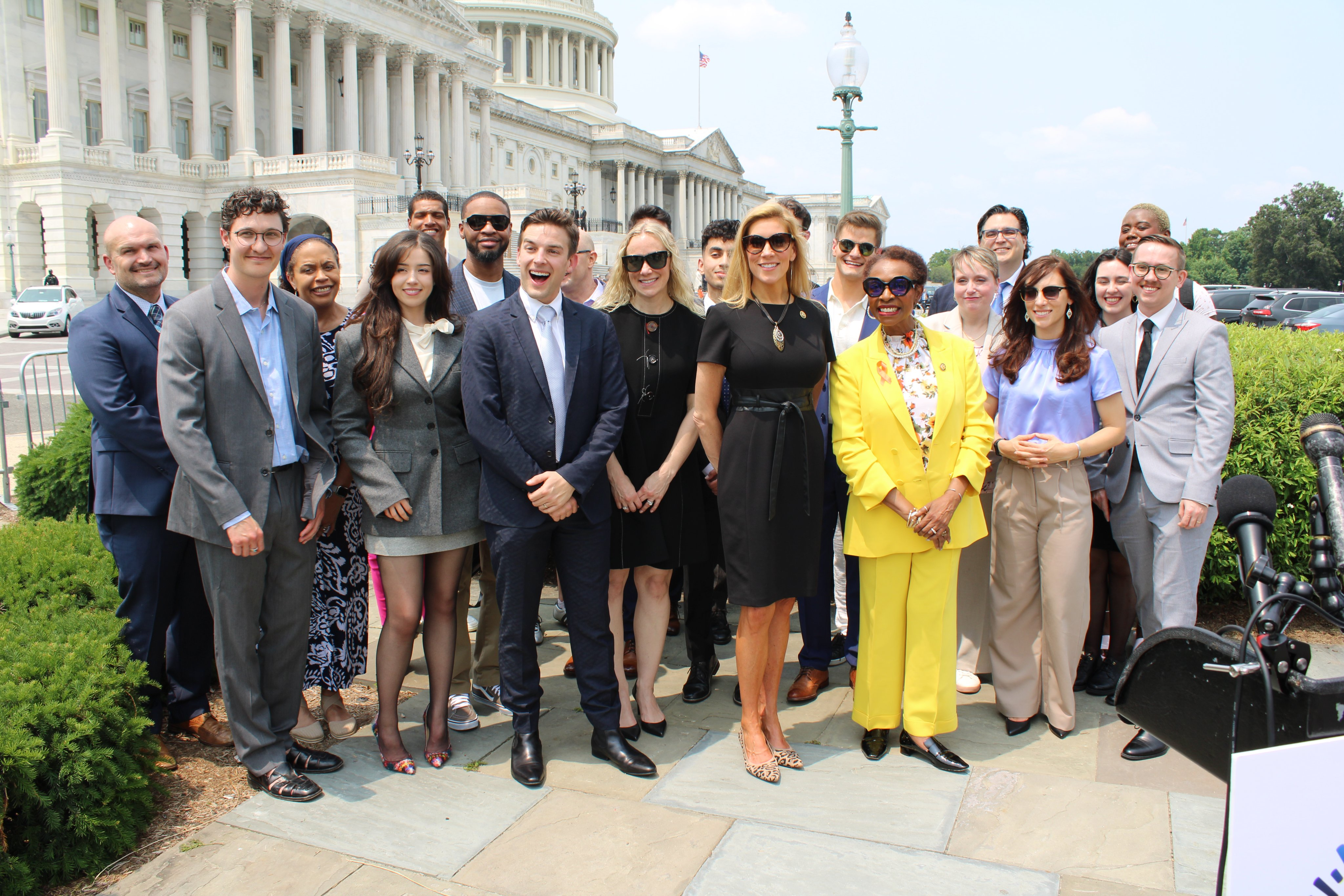
Clarke with various content creators and Representative Beth Van Duyne at the launch of the Creator Economy Caucus in June 2025.

- Black Maternal Health Caucus
- Congressional Black Caucus, Chair
- Congressional Caribbean Caucus, Chair
- Congressional Caucus on Multicultural Media, Chair
- Congressional Caucus on Black Women and Girls, Co-chair
- Congressional Caucus on Black Men and Boys, Co-chair
- Congressional Equality Caucus
- Congressional Progressive Caucus.
- Congressional Arts Caucus
- Medicare for All Caucus
- Congressional Caucus for the Equal Rights Amendment
- Congressional Caucus on Turkey and Turkish Americans
- Creator Economy Caucus Co-Chair

=== Policy positions ===
==== Abortion ====
Clarke has stated that she is pro-choice. She has earned high ratings from interest groups such as NARAL Pro-Choice America and Planned Parenthood for her votes against legislation to place restrictions on abortion rights, including the No Taxpayer Funding for Abortion Act of 2011, which would have prohibited federal funds from being used to cover abortions. Her ratings with anti-abortion organizations such as the National Right to Life Committee have been correspondingly low.

==== Budget, spending and tax issues ====
Clarke has consistently opposed legislation to reduce government spending and cut taxes, including voting against the Job Protection and Recession Prevention Act of 2012, which sought to extend tax cuts established during George W. Bush's administration through the end of 2013. Clarke received a 92% rating from the National Journal for being liberal on economic policy in 2011, while she received a 15% rating from the National Taxpayers Union for her positions on tax and spending in 2011, and a 2% rating from the Citizens Against Government Waste in 2010.

Clarke was among the 46 House Democrats who voted against final passage of the Fiscal Responsibility Act of 2023.

==== Environmental policy ====
Clarke has supported efforts to combat climate change and limit fossil fuel consumption. She has generally opposed legislation that gives priority to economic over conservation interests, such as the Stop the War on Coal Act of 2012 and the Conservation and Economic Growth Act of 2012. She has supported legislation that increases conservation efforts and regulation of the energy industry, such as the Offshore Drilling Regulations and Other Energy Law Amendments Act of 2010. In 2011 Clarke received 100% ratings from Environment America, the League of Conservation Voters, and the Sierra Club, the latter on her clean water positions, while she received a 14% rating over the period 2008–2011 from the Global Exchange for her loyalty to the finance, insurance, and real estate lobbies. She was strongly critical of the Trump administration's decision to withdraw from the Paris Agreement.

==== Immigration ====
Clarke has called for immigration reform that would create a path to citizenship for undocumented immigrants living in the United States and direct resources away from enforcement. In 2010, she voted for the DREAM Act, which passed the House but was blocked in the Senate. Clarke has voted against legislative proposals to constrain immigration. She praised the Obama administration's DACA program and condemned the Trump administration's termination of the program, calling it "cruel and vindictive". She has also called for extending the Temporary Protected Status granted to Haitian immigrants seeking refuge after the 2010 earthquake in Haiti, and for the abolition of ICE. In January 2026, Clarke and Delia Ramirez introduced the Melt ICE Act, which would end funding to DHS to detain or monitor immigrants.

==== Foreign policy ====
===== Israel-Palestine =====
Clarke has said she supports a two-state solution to the Israeli–Palestinian conflict. Some of her stances have subjected her to public criticism by constituents in her district, which is roughly 20% Jewish according to 2010 Census estimates. In 2010, Clarke signed two petitions urging Obama to pressure Israel to resolve the Gaza Blockade, which she later retracted. In 2009, she voted against H.R. 867, which sought to condemn the controversial Goldstone Report commissioned by the United Nations. In 2015 Clarke indicated she would vote for the JCPOA, known as the Iran nuclear deal, despite appeals from some of her Jewish constituents and local advocacy groups to vote against it. Explaining her decision, Clarke said in a statement, "Iran is on the verge of creating a nuclear bomb, right now. The JCPOA provides a pathway that holds great potential to forever change this reality." In 2015, Clarke attended Prime Minister of Israel Benjamin Netanyahu's speech before a joint session of Congress after initially expressing uncertainty. She voted to provide Israel with support following the October 7 attacks.

===== Syria =====
In 2023, Clarke was among 56 Democrats to vote in favor of H.Con.Res. 21, which directed President Joe Biden to remove U.S. troops from Syria within 180 days.

==== Technology ====
On April 10, 2019, Clarke and Senators Ron Wyden and Cory Booker introduced the Algorithmic Accountability Act of 2019, legislation granting additional powers to the Federal Trade Commission in addition to forcing companies to study whether race, gender or other biases influence their technology. That June, Clarke also introduced H.R. 3230: Deepfakes Accountability Act into the 116th United States Congress.

On January 11, 2022, Clarke and Representative Ritchie Torres sent a letter to Jen Easterly, the director of the Cybersecurity and Infrastructure Security Agency (CISA), requesting more information on efforts to reduce security risks to federal networks through the adoption of multi-factor authentication requirements. The letter argues that broad adoption of multi-factor-authentication is essential to protect the security of federal networks and systems.

Clarke introduced H.R. 5586, an updated Deepfakes Accountability Act into the 118th United States Congress on September 20, 2023, in a continuing effort to protect national security from deepfake technology threats, while providing legal recourse to victims of harmful deepfakes. Clarke is Co-Chair of the Congressional Creators Caucus alongside Beth Van Duyne.

=== In the media ===
On the Colbert Report, in its "Better Know a District" segment in early September 2012, when Stephen Colbert asked Clarke what she would have changed in 1898, the year Brooklyn merged with New York City, if she could go back in time, Clarke answered the abolition of slavery. Colbert replied, "Slavery...Really? I didn't realize there was slavery in Brooklyn in 1898". (Slavery was abolished in New York State in 1827.) Clarke responded, "I'm pretty sure there was", saying the Dutch owned slaves in New York in 1898. The next day, Clarke was unavailable for comment, and her media representative stated the statements were meant in jest.

=== 2016 presidential election ===
Clarke endorsed Hillary Clinton for president in 2016 and cast a vote for her as a superdelegate at the 2016 Democratic National Convention. During the 2016 campaign, Clarke appeared with Clinton at an event at Medgar Evers College.

== Political campaigns ==
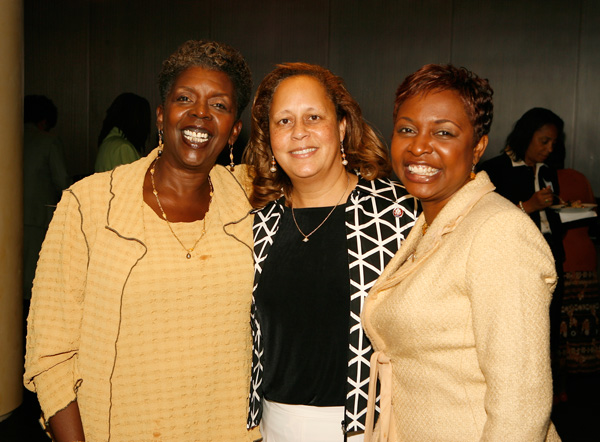
Yvette Clarke (right) with fellow congresswomen Stephanie Tubbs Jones of Ohio (left) and Laura Richardson of California (center)

In 2004, Clarke, then a member of the New York City Council, made her first run for Congress for the 11th district against incumbent Major Owens, for whom she had interned in college. Clarke's run followed an unsuccessful bid by her mother in 2000 against Owens for the same seat. Clarke lost the 2004 Democratic primary to Owens, who won 45.4% of the vote to her 28.9% in a multi-candidate race. After the 2004 election, Owens declined to seek reelection, after which Clarke announced her intention to run again in 2006. Owens later called Clarke and her mother's successive political campaigns against him "[a] stab in the back".

=== 2006 ===
In May 2006, another Caribbean-American candidate, Assemblyman N. Nick Perry, withdrew from the race to succeed Owens, leading some observers to contend that Clarke's chances for winning the race would improve now that another candidate from the same community was no longer competing.

==== Election results ====
On September 12, 2006, Clarke won the Democratic nomination with a plurality, 31.20%, of the vote in a four-person primary, defeating then-councilman David Yassky, State Senator Carl Andrews, and Major Owens's son, Christopher Owens. In the November 7 general election, Clarke was elected to the House of Representatives with 89% of the vote against Republican nominee Stephen Finger.

=== 2008 ===
Clarke was reelected on November 4 by a large margin.

=== 2010 ===
Clarke was reelected on November 2 by a large margin.

=== 2012 ===
Clarke was challenged in the Democratic primary by Sylvia Kinard, an attorney and ex-wife of former New York City Comptroller and mayoral candidate Bill Thompson. Clarke defeated Kinard with 88.3% of the vote. She had $50,000 in her campaign account before the June primary. In the November general election, Clarke defeated Republican nominee Daniel Cavanagh.

=== 2014 ===
Clarke was reelected with 89.5% of the vote, defeating Cavanagh again.

=== 2016 ===
Clarke ran unopposed in the primary and defeated Alan Bellone in the November general election with 92.4% of the vote.

=== 2018 ===
On June 26, Clarke narrowly defeated primary challenger Adem Bunkeddeko with 51.9% of the vote. She defeated Republican nominee Lutchi Gayot in the November 6 general election.

=== 2020 ===
Clarke faced a four-way Democratic primary against Adem Bunkeddeko, Chaim Deutsch, and former army veteran and Democratic Socialists of America member Isiah James.

== See also ==
- List of African-American United States representatives
- Women in the United States House of Representatives

U.S. House of Representatives
| Preceded by Major Owens | Member of the U.S. House of Representatives from New York's 11th congressional district 2007–2013 | Succeeded by Michael Grimm |
| Preceded by Bob Turner | Member of the U.S. House of Representatives from New York's 9th congressional district 2013–present | Incumbent |
| Preceded by Steven Horsford | Chair of the Congressional Black Caucus; 2025–present | Incumbent |
U.S. order of precedence (ceremonial)
| Preceded by Kathy Castor | United States representatives by seniority 56th | Succeeded by Steve Cohen |
| Preceded by Joe Courtney | Order of precedence of the United States | Succeeded by Steve Cohen |
