= Brooklyn Community Board 9 =

Brooklyn Community District 9
- Community District
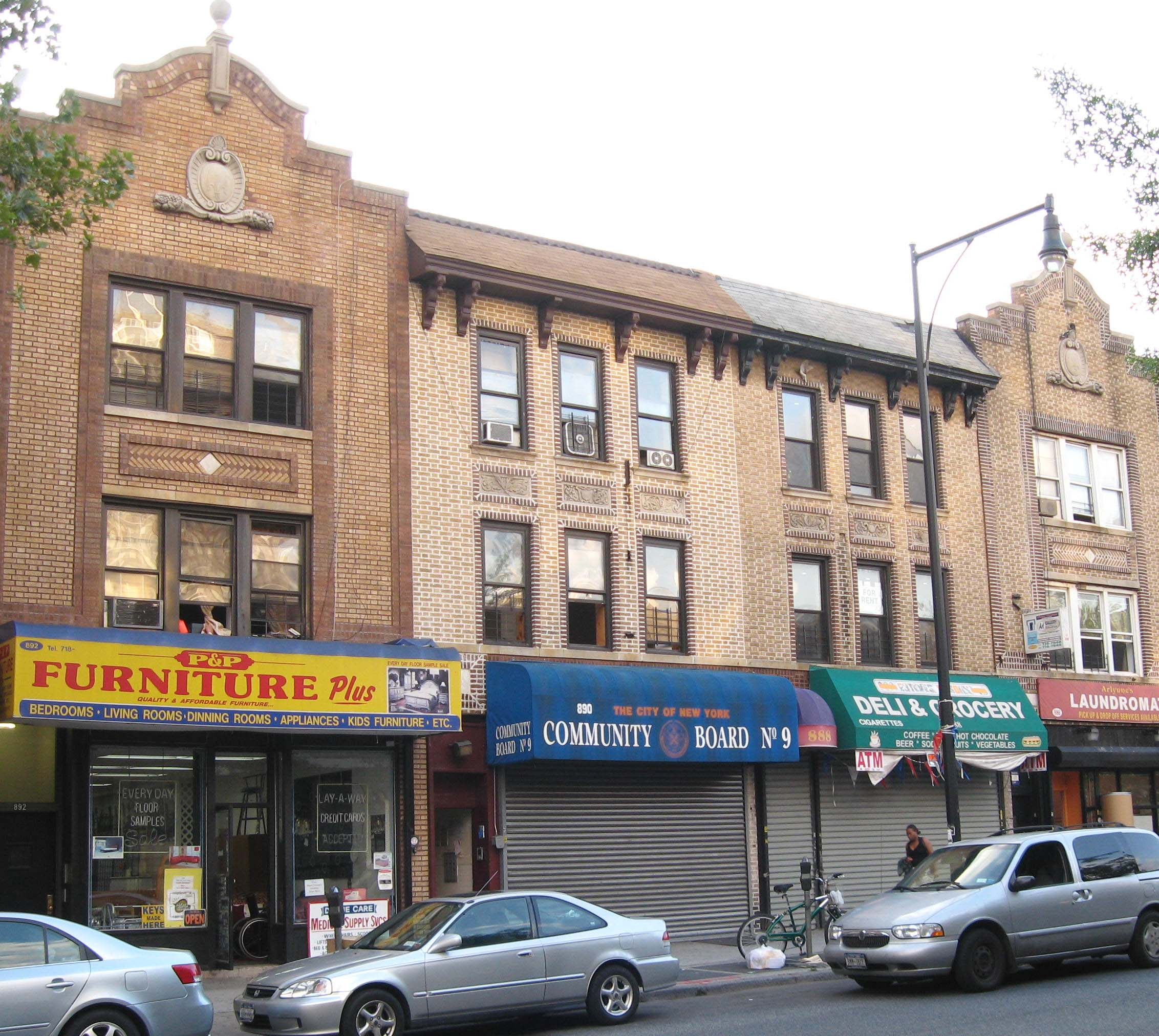
- Country: United States
- State: New York
- City: New York City
- Borough: Brooklyn
- Neighborhoods: List: Crown Heights; Prospect Lefferts Gardens; Wingate

Government
  - Chairperson: Ethan Norville
  - District Manager: Dante Arnwine

Area
  - Total: 1.6 sq mi (4.1 km^{2})

Population (2020)
  - Total: 102,000 ▲
  - Density: 64,000/sq mi (25,000/km^{2})

Ethnicity
  - Black: 51.8%
  - White: 28.0%
  - Hispanic and Latino (any race): 10.3%
  - Asian: 2.6%
  - Others: 7.4%
- Time zone: UTC−5 (Eastern)
  - Summer (DST): UTC−4 (EDT)
- ZIP codes: 11213, 11216, 11233, 11238, and 11225
- Area code: 718, 347, 929, and 917
- Police Precincts: 71st (website); 77th (website)
- Website: www.communitybrd9bklyn.org

Brooklyn Community Board 9 is a New York City community board that encompasses the Brooklyn neighborhoods of Crown Heights, Prospect Lefferts Gardens, and Wingate. It is delimited by Ocean Avenue and Flatbush Avenue on the west, Eastern Parkway on the north, Rochester, East New York and Utica Avenues on the east, as well as by Clarkson Avenue on the south.

Its former acting chairperson was Laura Imperiale, and district manager Pearl R. Miles. Miles was accused of "doing things without involving the community," per another community leader.

As of the 2000 US Census, the Community Board oversaw a population of 104,014, down from 110,715 in 1990 but up from 96,667 in 1980. Of them (as of 2000), 79,466 (76.4%) are African-American, 11,733 (11.3%) are White non Hispanic, 8,581 (8.2%) of Hispanic origins, 2,416 (2.3%) of two or more race, 819 (0.8%) Asian or Pacific Islander, 816 (0.8%) of some other race, and 183 (0.2%) American Indian or Native Alaskan,. 36.4% of the population benefit from public assistance as of 2004, up from 20.8% in 2000. The land area is 1,002.7 acres (4.058 km^{2}).

== Demographics ==
Historical population
Census	Pop.	Note	%±
1980	96,667		—
1990	110,715		14.5%
2000	104,014		−6.1%
2010	98,429		−5.4%
2020	102,000		3.6%
U.S. Decennial Census

Population by race as of 2000, 2010 and 2020 censuses:
Race	2000		2010		2020	
Black	79,466	76.40%	66,958	68.02%	52,807	51.77%
White	11,733	11.28%	18,825	19.12%	28,532	27.97%
Asian	819	0.79%	1,214	1.23%	2,640	2.59%
Other	999	0.96%	604	0.61%	2,279	2.23%
Multiracial	2,416	2.32%	1,671	1.70%	5,264	5.16%
Hispanic (any race)	8,581	8.25%	9,157	9.30%	10,478	10.27%
Total	104,014	100%	98,429	100%	102,000	100%
