= Rita Joseph =

American politician and educator

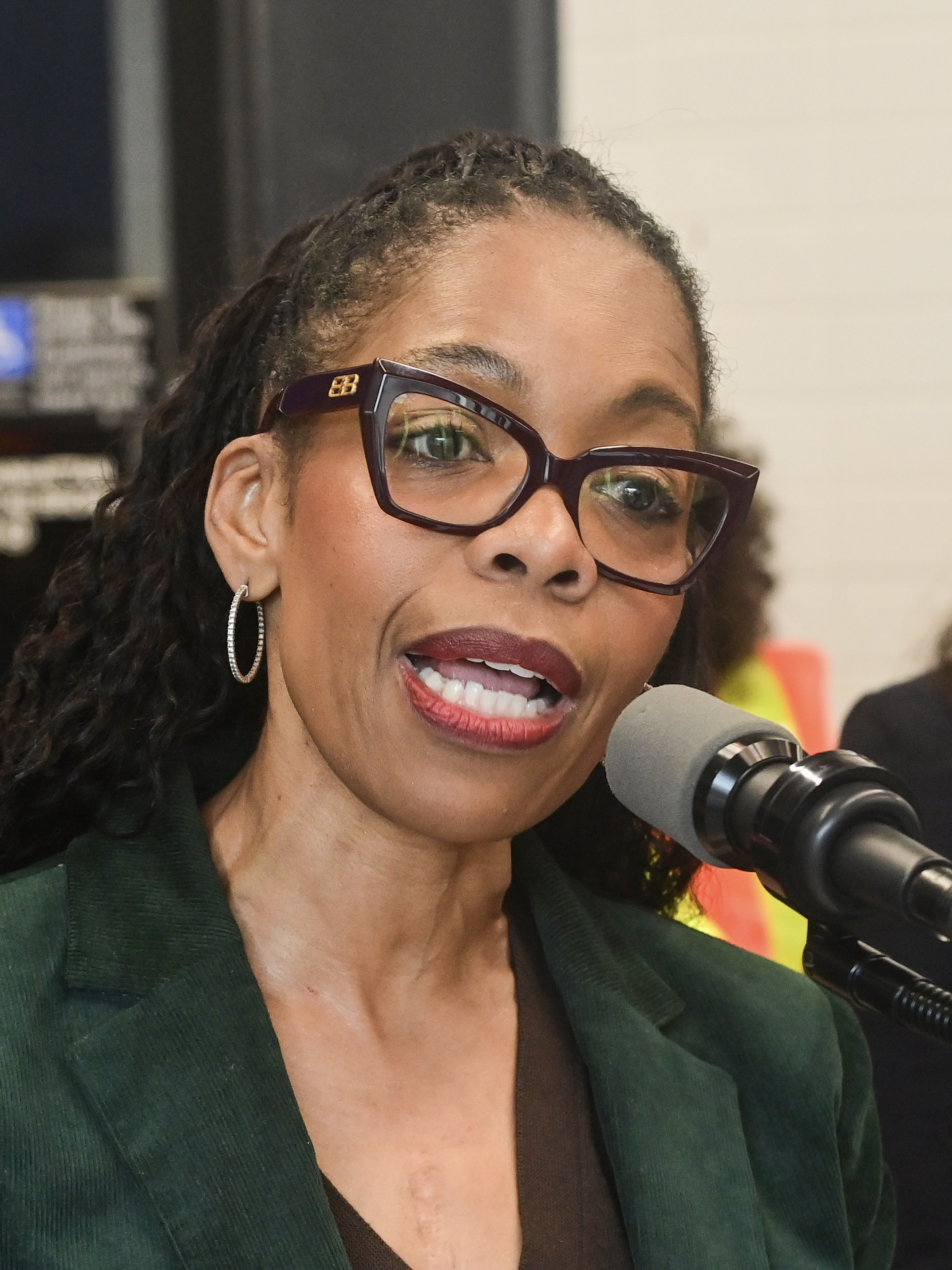
- Joseph speaking in 2025

Member of the New York City Council from the 40th district
- Incumbent
- Assumed office January 1, 2022
- Preceded by: Mathieu Eugene

Personal details
- Born: July 24, 1970 (age 56) Port-au-Prince, Haiti
- Party: Democratic
- Education: St. Francis College (BS); Touro University (MS)

Rita C. Joseph (born July 24, 1970) is an American politician and educator serving as a member of the New York City Council for the 40th district. Elected in November 2021, she assumed office on January 1, 2022.

== Early life and education ==
Joseph was born in Port-au-Prince, Haiti, and immigrated to New York City as a child. She was raised in Ditmas Park and Flatbush. After graduating from Sarah J. Hale High School, she earned a Bachelor of Science degree in liberal arts from St. Francis College and a Master of Science in education and general studies from Touro University, New York.

== Career ==
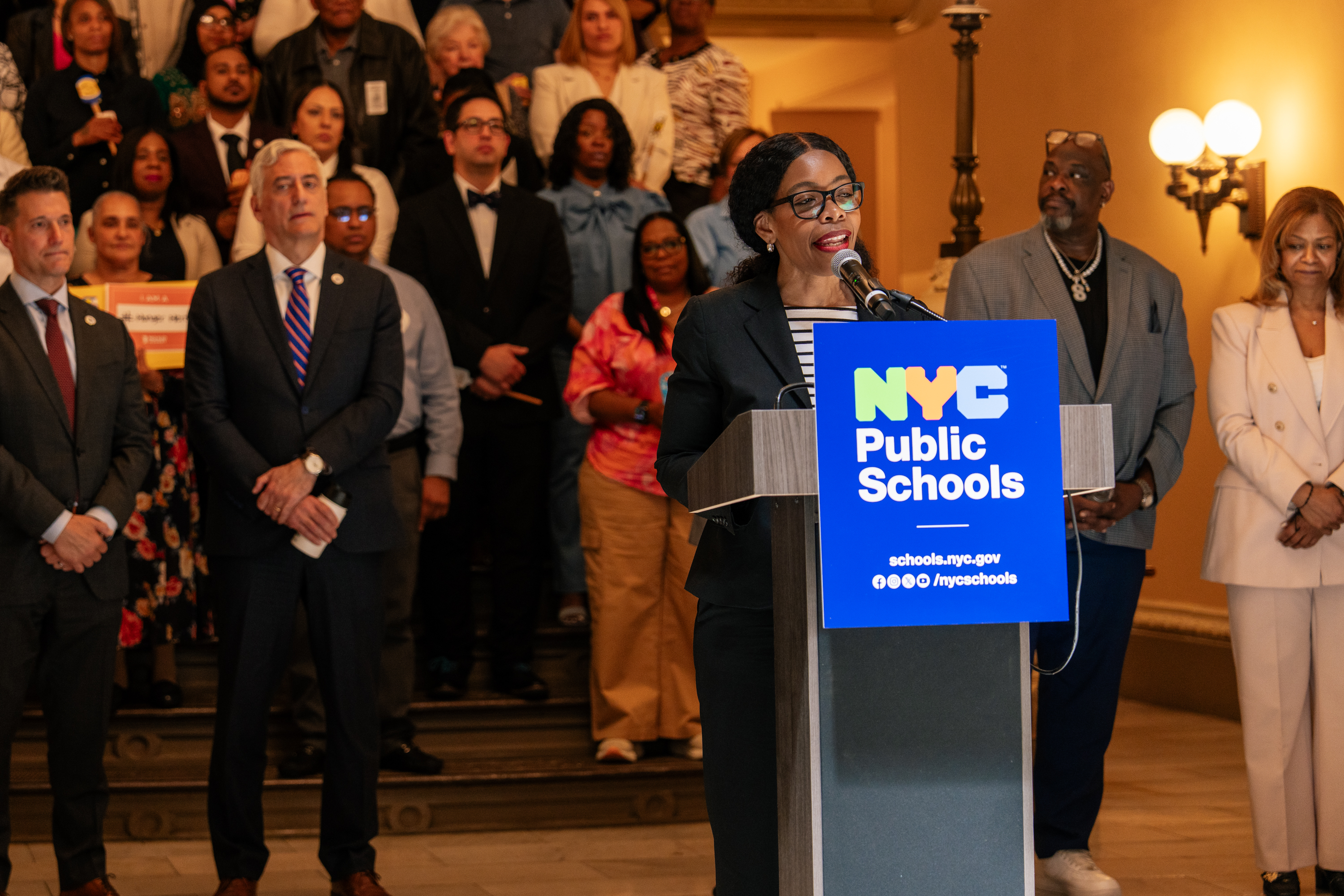
Joseph speaking at a New York City Department of Education event in 2025.

Outside of politics, Joseph worked as a teacher for over 20 years, including at Public School 6 in Brooklyn. She was also appointed to serve as the chair of her local Neighborhood Advisory Board by State Senator Kevin Parker. Joseph was elected to the New York City Council in November 2021 and assumed office on January 1, 2022.

== Electoral history ==
=== 2025 ===
2025 New York City Council election, District 40
| Party | Candidate | Votes | % |
|---|---|---|---|
| Democratic | Rita Joseph | 31,828 | 74.3 |
| Working Families | Rita Joseph | 10,668 | 24.9 |
| Total | Rita Joseph (incumbent) | 42,496 | 99.2 |
| Write-in | | 326 | 0.8 |
| Total votes | | 42,822 | 100.0 |
| Democratic hold | | | |

=== 2023 ===
2023 New York City Council election, District 40
| Party | Candidate | Votes | % |
|---|---|---|---|
| Democratic | Rita Joseph | 8,534 | 73.6 |
| Working Families | Rita Joseph | 2,621 | 22.6 |
| Total | Rita Joseph (incumbent) | 11,155 | 96.2 |
| Medical Freedom | Daniel B. Lally | 327 | 2.8 |
| Write-in | | 114 | 1.0 |
| Total votes | | 11,596 | 100.0 |
| Democratic hold | | | |

=== 2021 ===
2021 New York City Council Democratic primary, District 40
| Party | Candidate | Maximum round | Maximum votes | Share in maximum round | Maximum votes First round votes Transfer votes |
|---|---|---|---|---|---|
| Democratic | Rita Joseph | 10 | 10,065 | 59.6% | |
| Democratic | Josue Pierre | 10 | 6,829 | 40.4% | |
| Democratic | Kenya Handy-Hilliard | 9 | 5,620 | 29.5% | |
| Democratic | Edwin K. Raymond | 8 | 2,265 | 10.9% | |
| Democratic | Cecilia Cortez | 8 | 2,221 | 10.7% | |
| Democratic | Blake Morris | 7 | 1,368 | 6.5% | |
| Democratic | Maxi Eugene | 6 | 1,175 | 5.4% | |
| Democratic | Harriet L. Hines | 5 | 817 | 3.7% | |
| Democratic | John Williams | 4 | 705 | 3.2% | |
| Democratic | Vivia M. Morgan | 3 | 428 | 1.9% | |
| Democratic | Victor Jordan | 2 | 344 | 1.5% | |
| Write-In | | 1 | 60 | 0.3% | |

2021 New York City Council election, District 40
| Party | Candidate | Votes | % |
|---|---|---|---|
| Democratic | Rita Joseph | 19,854 | 93.1 |
| Republican | Constantine Jean-Pierre | 1,207 | 5.7 |
| Conservative | Constantine Jean-Pierre | 235 | 1.1 |
| Total | Constantine Jean-Pierre | 1,442 | 6.8 |
| Write-in | | 38 | 0.2 |
| Total votes | | 21,334 | 100.0 |
| Democratic hold | | | |
