= Prospect Lefferts Gardens =

- Neighborhood of Brooklyn
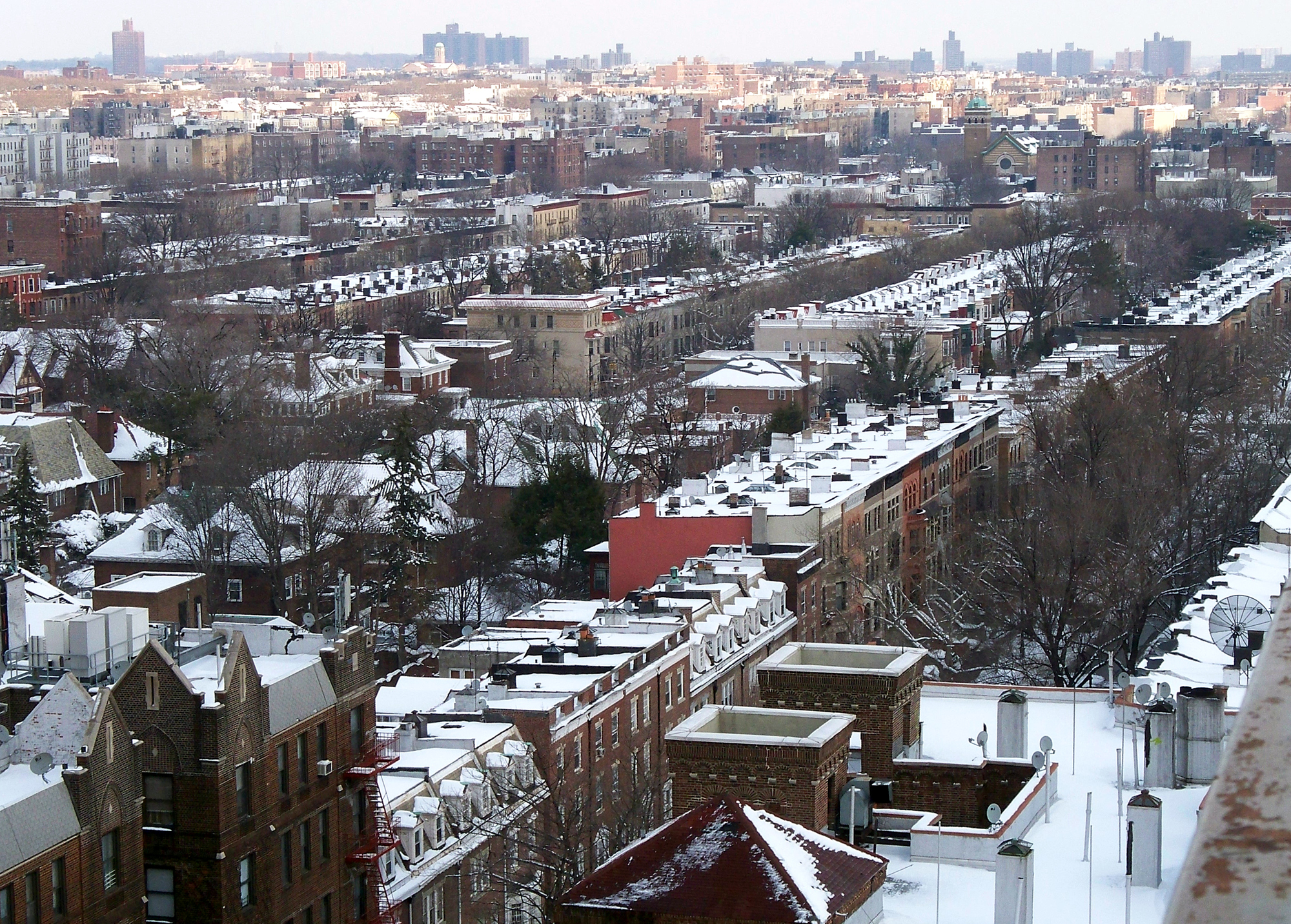
- Northeast view from top of Patio Gardens
- Location in New York City
- Coordinates: 40.66°N 73.95°W
- Country: United States
- State: New York
- City: New York City
- Borough: Brooklyn
- Community District: Brooklyn 9

Area
  - Total: 1.418 sq mi (3.67 km^{2})

Population (2015)
  - Total: 99,287
  - Density: 70,020/sq mi (27,030/km^{2})

Ethnicity
  - Black: 76.5%
  - Hispanic: 9.8
  - White: 9.7
  - Asian: 1.6
  - Others: 2.4

Economics
  - Median income: $39,319
- ZIP Codes: 11225
- Area code: 718, 347, 929, and 917
- Prospect Lefferts Gardens Historic District
- U.S. National Register of Historic Places
- U.S. Historic district
- New York State Register of Historic Places
- New York City Landmark
- Location within New York City Location within New York
- Location: Portions of Sterling, Maple, Midwood, and Fenimore Sts., Lefferts, Bedford, Roge, Brooklyn, New York
- Area: 63.54 acres (25.71 ha)
- NRHP reference No.: 100009073
- NYCL No.: 1024

Significant dates
- Added to NRHP: June 30, 2023
- Designated NYSRHP: March 9, 2023
- Designated NYCL: October 9, 1979

Prospect Lefferts Gardens is a residential neighborhood in Flatbush of the New York City borough of Brooklyn. The community is bounded by Empire Boulevard (formerly Malbone Street) to the north, Clarkson Avenue to the south, New York Avenue to the east, and Ocean Avenue/Prospect Park to the west. Prospect Lefferts Gardens was designated a New York City Landmark area in 1979 and called the Prospect Lefferts Gardens Historic District.

The neighborhood contains an ethnically diverse community with a largely Caribbean-American and African-American population. Since the 2000s, Prospect Lefferts Gardens has been gentrifying quickly. Real estate development has increased and new residents from other groups have increased.

Prospect Lefferts Gardens is part of Brooklyn Community District 9, and its primary ZIP Code is 11225. It is patrolled by the 71st Precinct of the New York City Police Department. Politically it is represented by the New York City Council's 40th District.

== Name ==
The name Prospect Lefferts Gardens was created in 1968 by the Prospect Lefferts Gardens Neighborhood Association (PLGNA). Prospect Lefferts Gardens is a combination of the names of three nearby locations: Prospect Park, Lefferts Manor, and the Brooklyn Botanic Garden. Lefferts Manor is named for the Dutch colonial family who built it; they were also one of the largest owners of slaves in Brooklyn.

== History ==
The area was originally settled by a Dutch family in 1665, at which time it was within the Town of Flatbush. In 1893 the Lefferts estate was divided by James Lefferts into 600 building lots, now known as Lefferts Manor, and sold to developers. Lefferts observed construction from the Lefferts homestead, then located on Flatbush Avenue between Maple and Midwood Streets (now a historic museum located in Prospect Park). In order to ensure that the neighborhood would contain homes of a substantial nature, Lefferts attached land-use deed restrictions, dictating that each lot contain a single family residence built of brick or stone at least two stories in height, among other restrictions. The land-use covenant still exists in Lefferts Manor. Houses in Lefferts Manor were mostly constructed during the late 19th century and early 20th century, the last of which were constructed in the early 1950s. Patio Gardens, the last large development built before the wave of gentrification in the mid-2000s, was constructed in the early 1960s.

Lefferts Manor and parts of Lefferts Avenue and Sterling Street, not in the single-family covenant, were granted landmark status by the New York City Landmarks Preservation Commission on October 9, 1979. The Lefferts Manor Historic District was listed on the National Register of Historic Places in 1992. In 2009 the neighborhood gained a second landmark district when the New York City Landmarks Preservation Commission designated the Ocean on the Park Historic District. As a small, early 20th century enclave that is set-back from the street, this historic district consists of only 2 brick and 10 limestone townhouses. Yet it stands in striking architectural contrast to the long line of large and stately apartment buildings which otherwise dominate Ocean Avenue at the southeastern border of Prospect Park. In 2014 a third small historic district–Chester Court, a cull-de-sac off the west side of Flatbush Avenue, near Rutland Road, was designated. The Chester Court Historic District has 18 Tudor-revival townhouses, similar to those on Rutland Road in the main Historic District. The Prospect Lefferts Gardens Historic District was nominated and later added to the National Register of Historic Places in 2023.

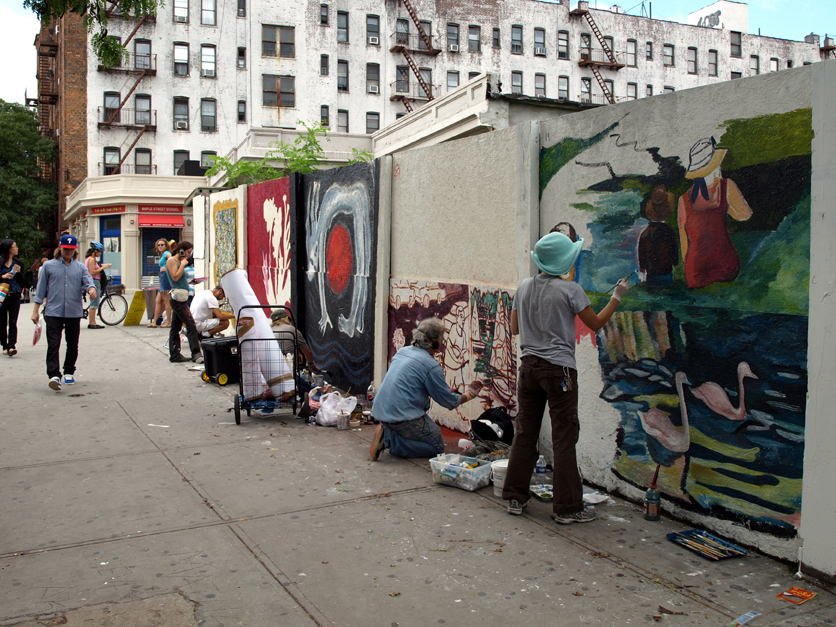
Artists paint murals along Lincoln Road

Concurrent with the development of Lefferts Manor was the growth of the surrounding area, now known collectively as Prospect Lefferts Gardens. Many one and two family homes were constructed in the early 20th century. Presently, other areas of Prospect Lefferts Gardens contain a mixture of single-family and multi-family homes as well as larger apartment houses.

Since the 1960s, Caribbean immigrants have settled in Prospect Lefferts Gardens as well as in surrounding areas such as East Flatbush, Flatbush, and Crown Heights. The overlapping sections of these neighborhoods were nicknamed Little Caribbean on Google Maps.

== Community organizations ==
Prospect Lefferts Gardens has a long tradition of community participation and involvement. In 2009, PLG Arts transformed multiple drab-looking construction facades into murals that reflected the area and its artists. LinRoFORMA, founded 2010, organizes Lincoln Road residents and businesses to revitalize the street and neighborhood. PLG Community Supported Agriculture links the community and a Connecticut farm, bringing organic produce and vegetables to residents and providing sustainability for future growth. Strong interest in improved food options led to the formation of the Lefferts Community Food Cooperative in 2009, a market that uses cooperative principles to sell socially responsible and healthy food products. The Maple Street Community Garden, founded in 2012 at 237 Maple St., is a communally managed organic vegetable garden open to the public, and runs an active composting program. Other organizations include the Lefferts Manor Association, which was founded in 1919 to enforce the single family covenant; and PLGNA, the Prospect Lefferts Gardens Neighborhood Association, founded 1968.

== Demographics ==
Based on data from the 2010 United States census, the population of Prospect Lefferts Gardens was 67,459, a change of −2,841 (−4.2%) from the 70,300 counted in 2000. Covering an area of 726.33 acres (293.94 ha), the neighborhood had a population density of 92.9 inhabitants per acre (59,500/sq mi; 23,000/km^{2}). The racial makeup of the neighborhood was 9.6% (6,495) White, 76.5% (51,578) African American, 0.2% (155) Native American, 1.6% (1,063) Asian, 0% (17) Pacific Islander, 0.4% (292) from other races, and 1.8% (1,231) from two or more races. Hispanic or Latino of any race were 9.8% (6,628) of the population.

The entirety of Community Board 9, which covers Prospect Lefferts Gardens and Crown Heights South, had 98,650 inhabitants as of NYC Health's 2018 Community Health Profile, with an average life expectancy of 81.2 years. This is equal to the median life expectancy of all New York City neighborhoods. Most inhabitants are middle-aged adults and youth: 22% are between the ages of 0 and 17, 30% between 25 and 44, and 25% between 45 and 64. The ratio of college-aged and elderly residents was lower, at 9% and 14% respectively.

As of 2016, the median household income in Community Board 9 was $51,072. In 2018, an estimated 22% of Crown Heights South residents lived in poverty, compared to 21% in all of Brooklyn and 20% in all of New York City. One in nine residents (11%) were unemployed, compared to 9% in the rest of both Brooklyn and New York City. Rent burden, or the percentage of residents who have difficulty paying their rent, is 55% in Crown Heights South, higher than the citywide and boroughwide rates of 52% and 51% respectively. Based on this calculation, as of 2018, Crown Heights South is considered to be gentrifying.

According to the 2020 census data from New York City Department of City Planning, there were 20,000 to 29,999 Black residents, 10,000 to 19,999 White residents, and 5,000 to 9,999 Hispanic residents.

== Police and crime ==
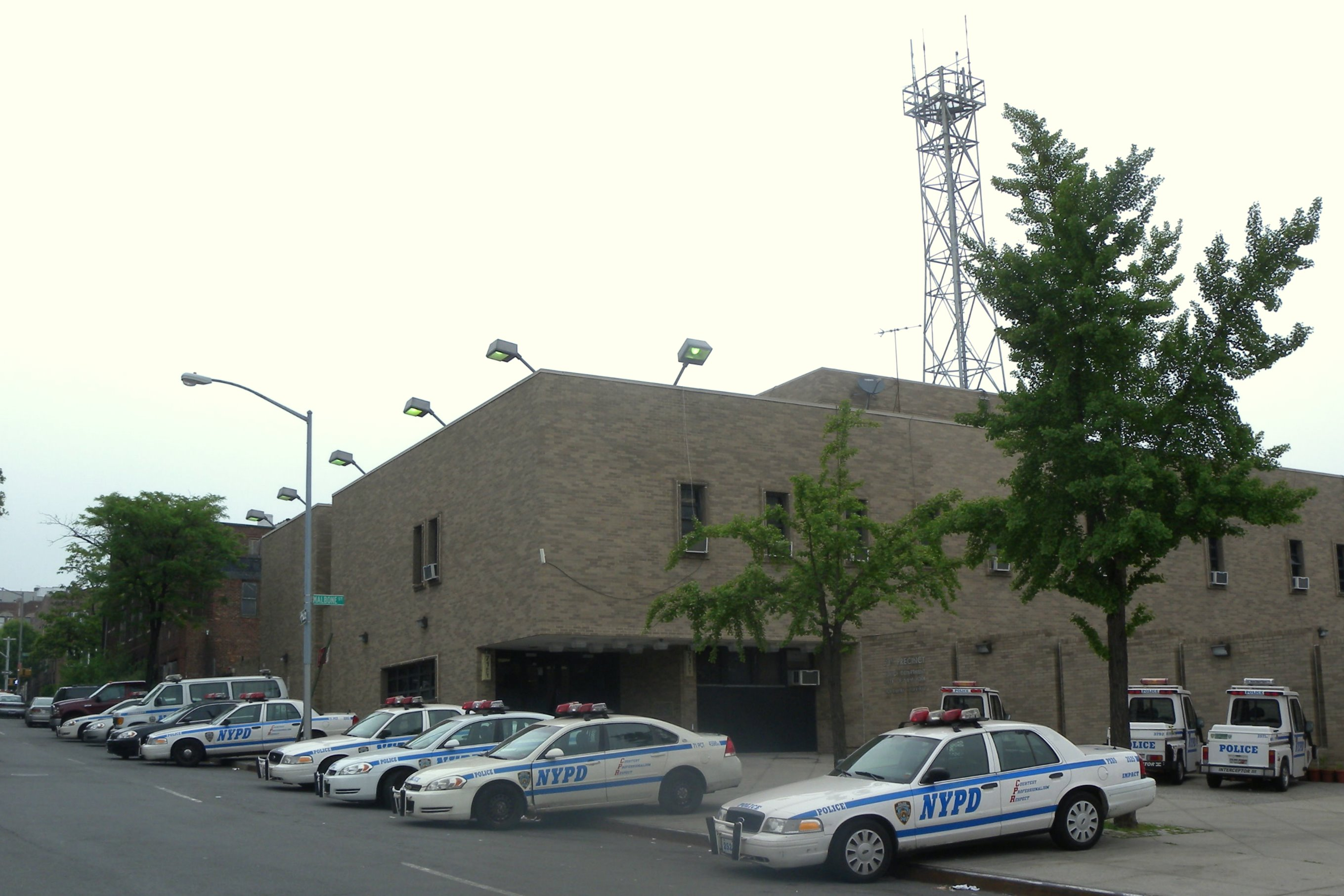
71st Precinct

Prospect Lefferts Gardens is patrolled by the 71st Precinct of the NYPD, located at 421 Empire Boulevard. The 71st Precinct ranked 46th safest out of 69 patrol areas for per-capita crime in 2010. As of 2018, with a non-fatal assault rate of 73 per 1,000 people in Prospect Lefferts Gardens, rates of violent crimes per capita are greater than that of the city as a whole. The incarceration rate of 598 per 100,000 people is also greater than that of the city as a whole.

The 71st Precinct has a lower crime rate than in the 1990s, with crimes across all categories having decreased by 31% between 2010 and June 2025. The precinct reported 1 murder, 8 rapes, 51 robberies, 167 felony assaults, 32 burglaries, 142 grand larcenies, and 40 grand larcenies auto in the first half of 2025.

== Fire safety ==
The New York City Fire Department (FDNY) operates two fire stations in Prospect Lefferts Gardens. Engine Co. 281/Ladder Co. 147 is located at 1210 Cortelyou Road, while Engine Co. 249/Ladder Co. 113 is located at 491 Rogers Avenue.

== Health ==
As of 2018, preterm births in Prospect Lefferts Gardens and Crown Heights South are more common than in other places citywide, though births to teenage mothers are less common than in other places citywide. There were 91 preterm births per 1,000 live births in Prospect Lefferts Gardens (compared to 87 per 1,000 citywide) and 14.8 births to teenage mothers per 1,000 live births (compared to 19.3 per 1,000 citywide). Both neighborhoods have a relatively high population of residents who are uninsured, or who receive healthcare through Medicaid. In 2018, this population of uninsured residents was estimated to be 16% in Prospect Lefferts Gardens, compared to the citywide rate of 12%.

Air pollution is 0.0078 milligrams per cubic meter (7.8×10^{−9} oz/ft^{3}) in Prospect Lefferts Gardens, slightly higher than the citywide and boroughwide averages. Eight percent of residents are smokers, compared to the city average of 14% of residents being smokers. In Prospect Lefferts Gardens Crown Heights South, 32% of residents are obese, 15% are diabetic, and 37% have high blood pressure. In addition, 19% of children are obese, compared to the citywide average of 20%.

Eighty-one percent of Prospect Lefferts Gardens and Crown Heights South residents eat some fruits and vegetables every day, which is slightly lower than the city's average of 87%. In 2018, 84% of residents described their health as "good", "very good", or "excellent", compared to the city's average of 78%. For every supermarket, there are 21 bodegas in Prospect Lefferts Gardens and Crown Heights South.

== Education ==
Prospect Lefferts Gardens generally has a similar ratio of college-educated residents to the rest of the city as of 2018. While 35% of residents age 25 and older have a college education or higher, 16% have less than a high school education and 48% are high school graduates or have some college education. By contrast, 40% of Brooklynites and 38% of city residents have a college education or higher. In Prospect Lefferts Gardens, reading achievement rose from 31 percent in 2000 to 37 percent in 2011, and math achievement rose from 21 percent to 47 percent within the same time period.

Prospect Lefferts Gardens' rates of elementary school student absenteeism are higher than the rest of New York City. The proportions of elementary school students who missed twenty or more days per school year were 22% in the neighborhood, compared to the citywide average of 20% of students. Additionally, 77% of high school students graduate on time, compared to the citywide average of 75% of students.

=== Schools ===
There are four public schools within the area's borders which are part of NYC School District 17. There are two middle schools: M.S. 002 for sixth to eighth graders and M.S. 61 which serves the sixth through ninth grades. P.S. 92 is an elementary school for kindergarten through fifth grade. In 2010, the Lefferts Gardens Charter School opened an elementary program that focuses on environmental science and experiential learning.

=== Library ===
The Brooklyn Public Library (BPL)'s Crown Heights branch, on the border with Crown Heights, is located at 560 New York Avenue near Maple Street.

== Politics ==
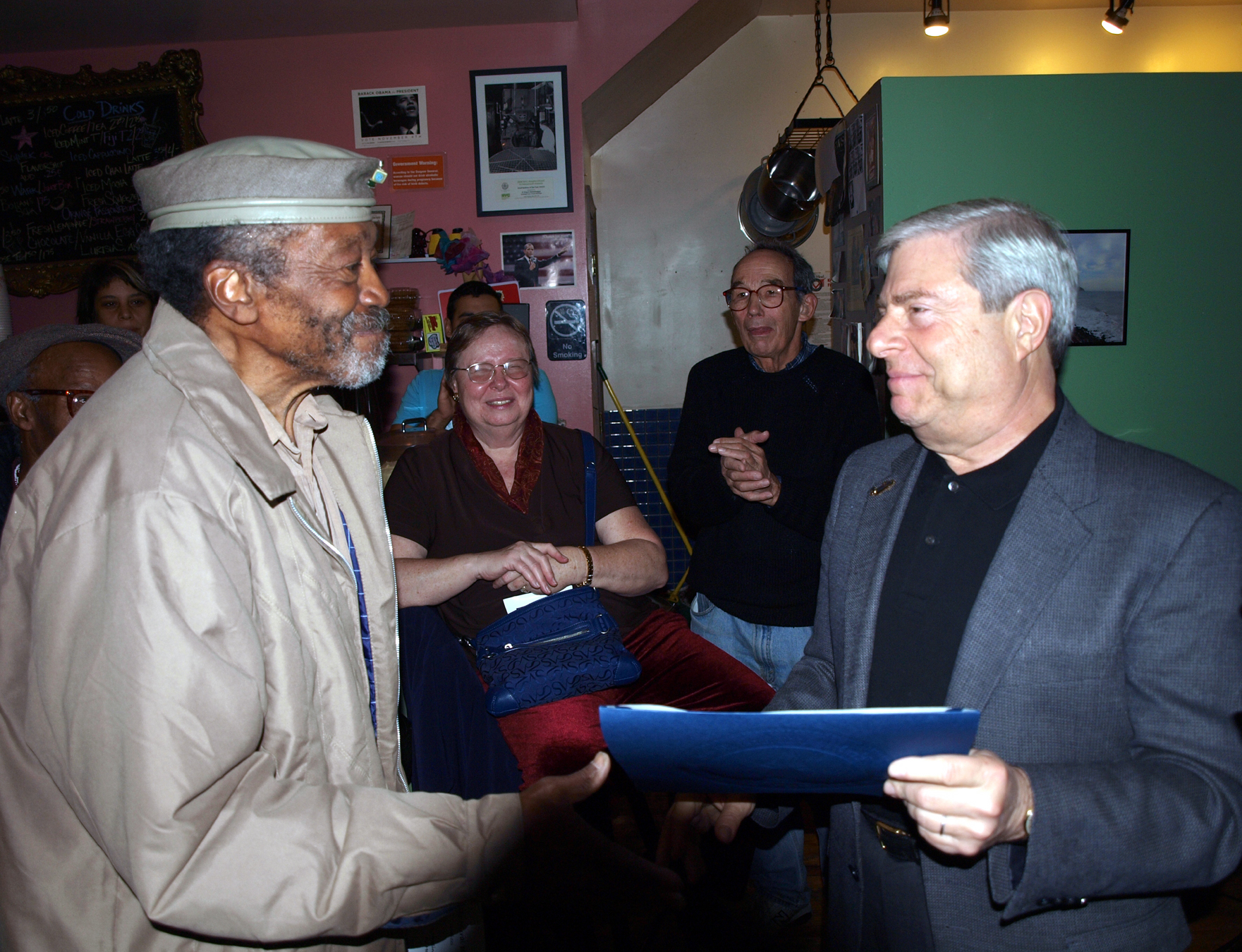
Former Borough President Marty Markowitz speaks at local cafe

The neighborhood is part of New York's 9th congressional district, represented by Democrat Yvette Clarke as of 2013. It is also part of the 20th and 21st State Senate districts, represented by Democrats Zellnor Myrie and Kevin S. Parker, and the 42nd and 43rd State Assembly districts, represented respectively by Democrats Rodneyse Bichotte and Brian Cunningham. Prospect Lefferts Gardens is located in New York's 35th and 40th City Council districts, represented respectively by Democrats Crystal Hudson and Rita Joseph.

Prospect Lefferts Gardens is served by Brooklyn Community Board 9.

== Transportation ==
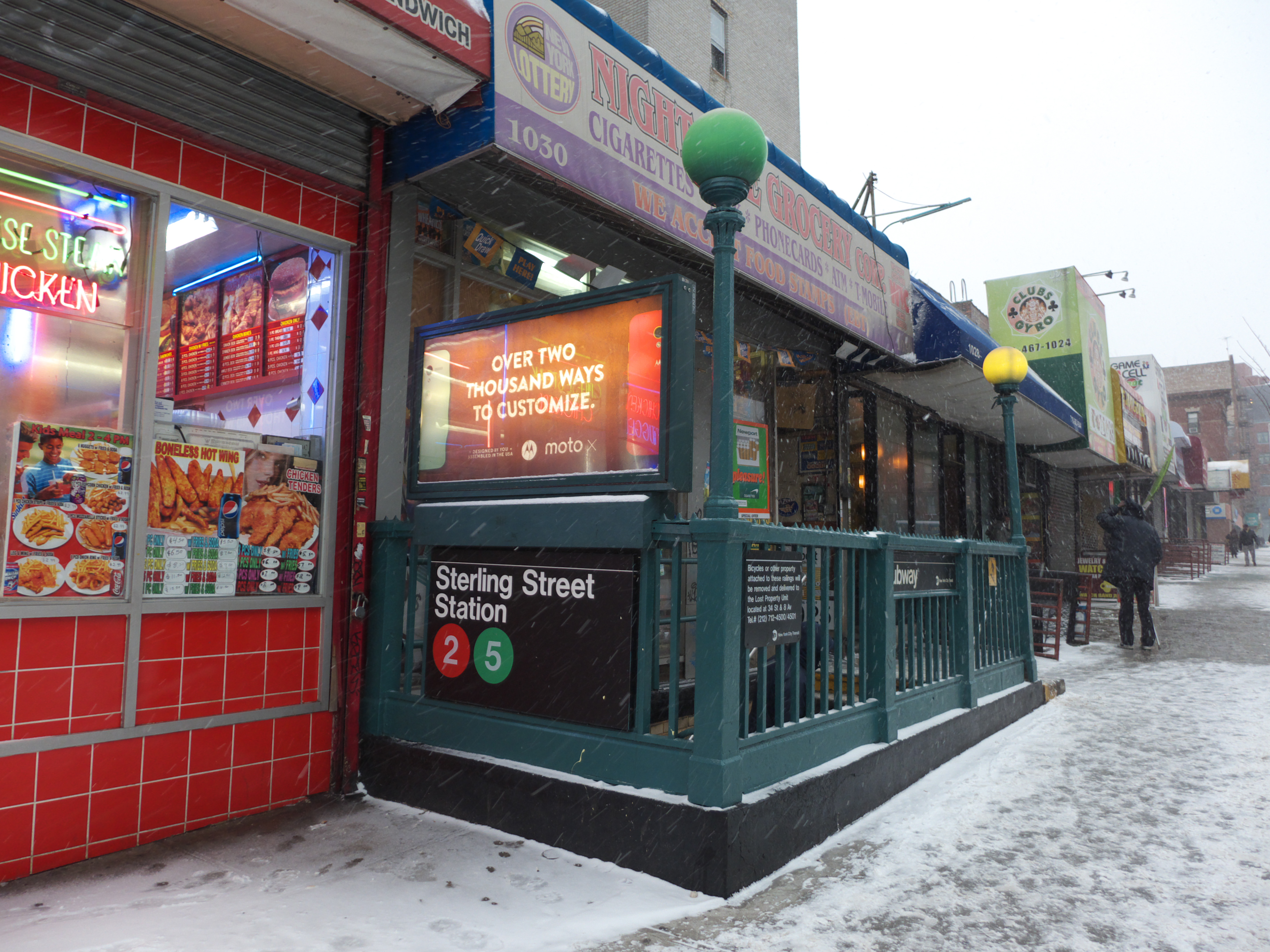
Sterling Street subway station in northern Prospect-Lefferts Gardens.

Prospect Lefferts Gardens is serviced by the New York City Subway's B, Q, and S trains at the Prospect Park station and the Q train at the Parkside Avenue station (both on the BMT Brighton Line), as well as the Sterling Street and Winthrop Street stations on the IRT Nostrand Avenue Line (2 and 5 trains). Additionally, the B12, B16, B41, B43, B44, B44 SBS, B48 and B49 New York City Bus routes serve the area.

== See also ==
- Malbone Street wreck, a subway accident near the Prospect Park station in 1919
- Lefferts Historic House, a landmark house in Prospect Park
