= Fort Hamilton Parkway station (BMT West End Line) =

New York City Subway station in Brooklyn

Fort Hamilton Parkway
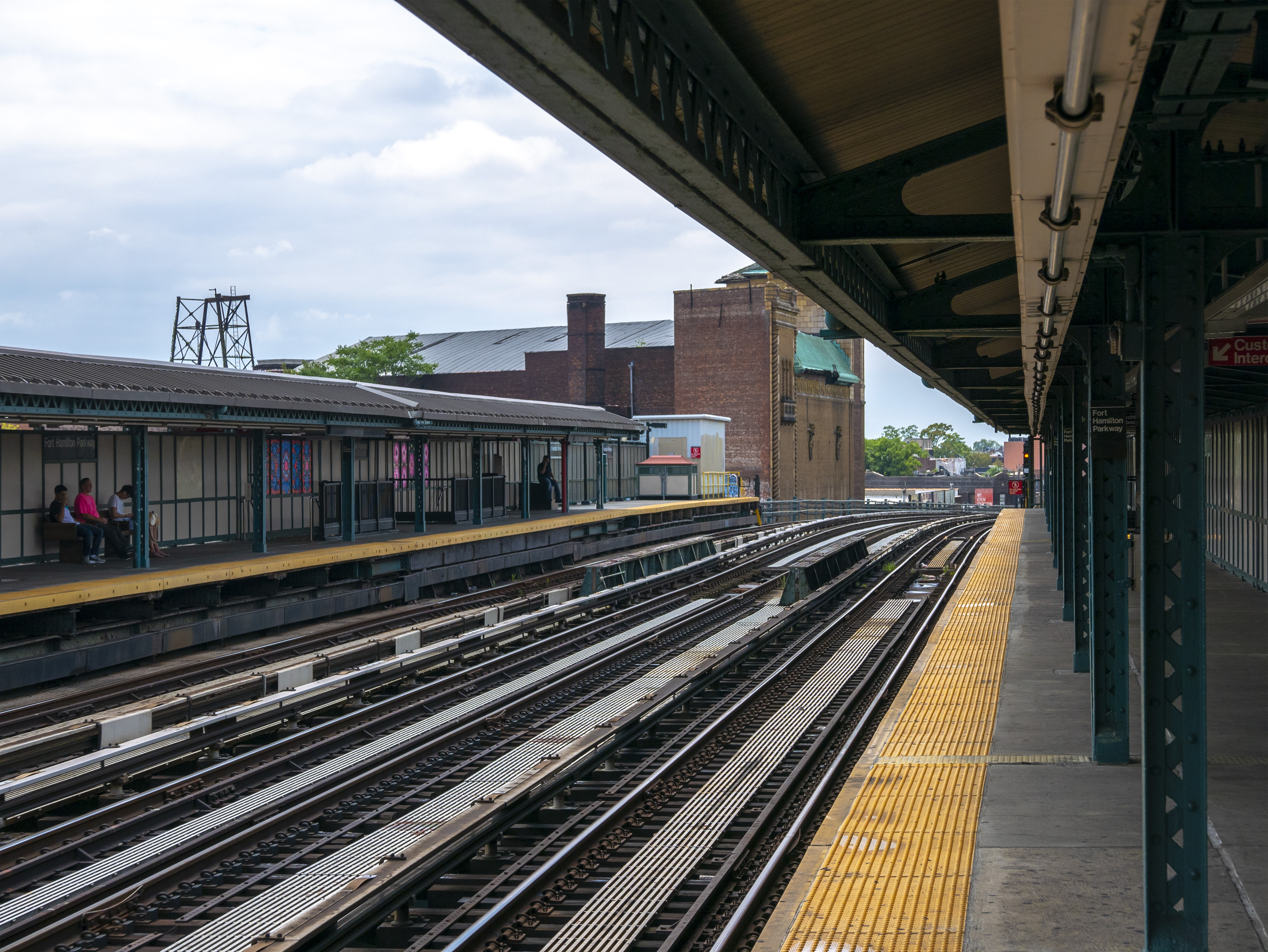

Station statistics
- Address: Fort Hamilton Parkway & New Utrecht Avenue; Brooklyn, New York
- Borough: Brooklyn
- Locale: Borough Park
- Coordinates: 40.6407°N 73.9944°W
- Division: B (BMT)
- Line: BMT West End Line
- Services: D (all times)
- Transit: Private Transportation Co.: B110
- Structure: Elevated
- Platforms: 2 side platforms
- Tracks: 3 (2 in regular service)

Other information
- Opened: June 24, 1916; 110 years ago
- Accessible: No; planned
- Former/other names: 44th Street

Traffic
- 2025: 1,013,287 ▲12.1%
- Rank: 306 out of 423
Services
Preceding station	New York City Subway	Following station
Ninth Avenue toward Norwood–205th Street	Local	50th Street toward Coney Island–Stillwell Avenue
and do not stop here
Location
Location within New York City Subway
Location within New York City
Location within New York
Track layout
Street map
Station service legend
Symbol	Description
Stops all times	Stops all times

The Fort Hamilton Parkway station is a local station on the BMT West End Line of the New York City Subway, located in Brooklyn at the intersection of Fort Hamilton Parkway and New Utrecht Avenue, in the neighborhood of Borough Park. It is served by the D train at all times. The station opened in 1916, and had its platforms extended in the 1960s.

== History ==
Fort Hamilton Parkway station opened as 44th Street on June 24, 1916, along with the first portion of the BMT West End Line from 36th Street on the BMT Fourth Avenue Line to 18th Avenue station. The line was originally a surface excursion railway to Coney Island, called the Brooklyn, Bath and Coney Island Railroad, which was established in 1862, but did not reach Coney Island until 1864. Under the Dual Contracts of 1913, an elevated line was built over New Utrecht Avenue, 86th Street and Stillwell Avenue.

The platforms at the station were extended in the 1960s to 615 feet (187 m) to accommodate ten-car trains.

In July 2026, the Metropolitan Transportation Authority announced plans for accessibility renovations at five subway stations in Brooklyn. The Fort Hamilton Parkway station would receive two elevators.

== Station layout ==
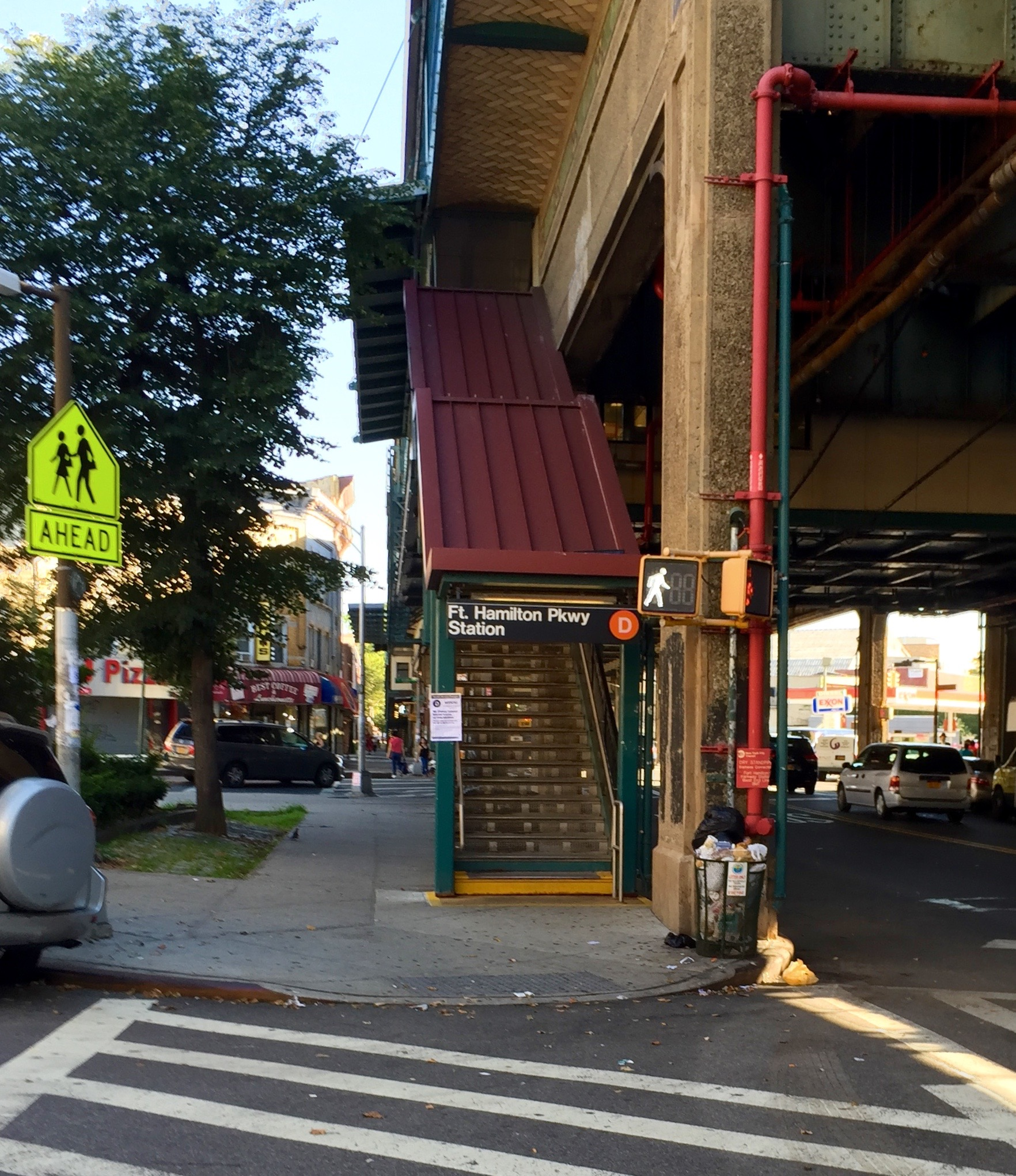
Northwestern stair

This elevated station has three tracks and two slightly offset side platforms. The D train stops here at all times, and the center express track is not normally used in service. Both platforms have full cream-colored windscreens and red canopies, and for most of their centers, both windscreens are supported by green frames and columns.

The station's artwork, installed during a 2012 renovation, is called Gardens of Fort Hamilton Parkway Station by Portia Munson. It consists of stained glass murals on the platform windscreens depicting various plants.

=== Exits ===
This station has two station houses beneath the platforms and tracks. The full-time one is at the south end. It has two staircases to each platform, a waiting area/crossunder, a turnstile bank, a token booth, and staircases going down to either northern corners of New Utrecht Avenue or 45th Street. The north station house is abandoned. A single staircase from each platform goes down to a walkway on either side of the building, where a turnstile provides access to and from the station. Two staircases go down to either side of New Utrecht Avenue between 44th and 43rd Streets.
