= Ninth Avenue station =

New York City Subway station in Brooklyn

9 Avenue
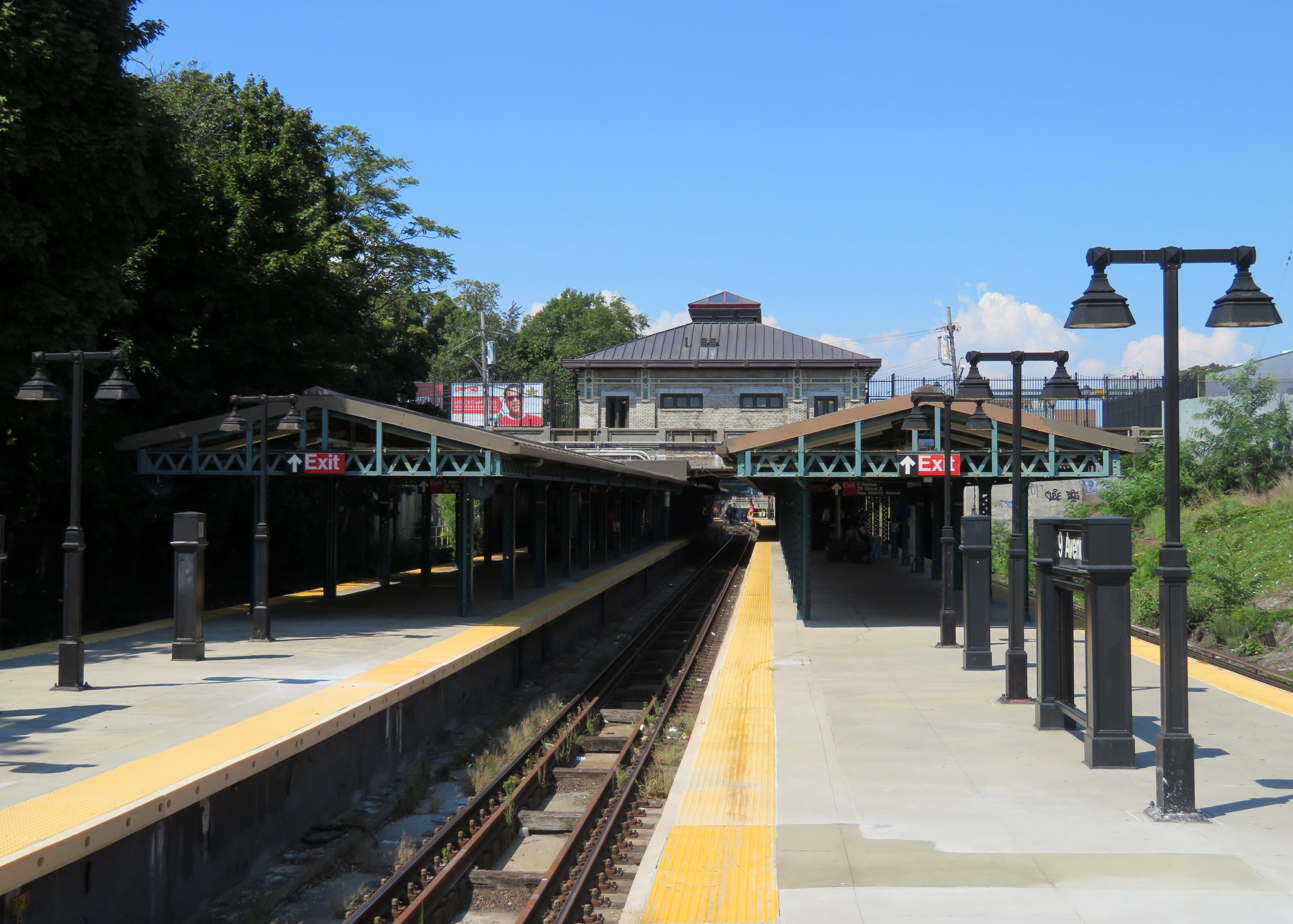
- Ninth Avenue station in September 2018

Station statistics
- Address: Ninth Avenue & 39th Street; Brooklyn, New York
- Borough: Brooklyn
- Locale: Sunset Park, Borough Park
- Coordinates: 40.646575°N 73.994674°W
- Division: B (BMT)
- Line: BMT West End Line; BMT Culver Line (formerly)
- Services: D (all times); R (one southbound a.m. rush-hour trip); W (two southbound a.m. rush-hour trips)
- Transit: NYCT Bus: B35
- Structure: Open-cut
- Levels: 2 (upper level is in revenue service)
- Platforms: 4 island platforms (2 on each level) cross-platform interchange
- Tracks: 6 (3 on each level)

Other information
- Opened: June 24, 1916; 110 years ago
- Closed: BMT Culver Line platforms: May 11, 1975; 51 years ago

Traffic
- 2025: 1,397,190 ▲8%
- Rank: 241 out of 423
Services
Preceding station	New York City Subway	Following station
36th Street D toward Norwood–205th Street	Local	Fort Hamilton Parkway D toward Coney Island–Stillwell Avenue
36th Street One-way operation	no regular service	62nd Street R W express
Non-revenue services and lines
Preceding station	New York City Subway	Following station
36th Street Culver; demolished	no service	Fort Hamilton Parkway Culver; demolished
Location
Location within New York City Subway
Location within New York City
Location within New York
Track layout
West End Line/upper level
Culver Line/lower level
Street map
Station service legend
Symbol	Description
Stops all times	Stops all times
Stops rush hours in the peak direction only	Stops rush hours in the peak direction only
- 9th Avenue Station (Dual System BRT)
- U.S. National Register of Historic Places
- New York State Register of Historic Places
- MPS: New York City Subway System MPS
- NRHP reference No.: 05000676
- NYSRHP No.: 04701.015593

Significant dates
- Added to NRHP: March 3, 2005
- Designated NYSRHP: May 11, 2005

The Ninth Avenue station is a bi-level express station on the BMT West End Line of the New York City Subway, located at the intersection of Ninth Avenue and 39th Street in Brooklyn. Each level has three tracks and two island platforms. The upper level serves the BMT West End Line while the lower level formerly served the BMT Culver Line, which was discontinued in 1975. Only the upper level is still in service and is served by the D train at all times. During the morning rush hour, one southbound R train and two southbound W trains stop here.

== History ==
The Ninth Avenue station opened on June 24, 1916, along with the first portion of the BMT West End Line from 36th Street on the BMT Fourth Avenue Line to 18th Avenue station. The line was originally a surface excursion railway to Coney Island, called the Brooklyn, Bath and Coney Island Railroad, which was established in 1862, but did not reach Coney Island until 1864. Under the Dual Contracts of 1913, an elevated line was built over New Utrecht Avenue, 86th Street and Stillwell Avenue.

The platforms were extended in the 1950s to accommodate the current standard B Division train length of 615 feet (187 m).

The station was renovated in 2012 with new platform edges, a new dispatcher room and a new stairway that leads to the 36th Street Yard.

== Station layout ==
This express station has two levels, though only the upper level is in use. Both levels of the station have three tracks and two island platforms. D trains stop here at all times, making local stops. During the morning rush hour, one southbound R train and two southbound W trains stop here, making express stops. The next station to the north is 36th Street, while the next station to the south is Fort Hamilton Parkway for local trains and 62nd Street for express trains.

=== Upper level ===
The upper level is the only one in use. The center express track is not normally used, thus only the local tracks are in regular service. On the upper level, the Manhattan-bound platform is slightly wider than the Coney Island-bound platform. Towards the west end of the upper level platforms is an employee-only pedestrian bridge that leads to the entrance of the 36th–38th Street Yard via a high turnstile. A control tower for line is at the south end of the yard. The east end of the station is slightly below ground level.

=== Lower level ===
The lower level was used as a through route for the BMT Culver Line to the BMT Fourth Avenue subway and the BMT Fifth Avenue elevated lines until 1954, when service on the main portion of the BMT Culver Line route was recaptured by the Independent Subway System via the Culver Ramp. A Culver Shuttle service from this station to a new single track terminal at Ditmas Avenue began at the same time. Culver trains continued to operate into lower Manhattan until May 1959. Culver Shuttle service was discontinued on May 11, 1975. The lower level was abandoned afterwards and has not been used for passenger service.

The level is dark and there are no safety plates on the two staircases to that level. A fluorescent light remains on the southbound side. The next stop for this shuttle to the south (east) was Fort Hamilton Parkway. The tracks curve just east of the station before the center and southbound local end at bumper blocks, at the east end of the tunnel portal. The northbound local continues past the portal and runs along another track coming from the 36th–38th Street Yard, but does not connect with it. This track was the track used during Ninth Avenue–Ditmas Avenue shuttle operation from 1959 until 1975.

==== Use as filming location ====
The lower level was used for the filming of the original Crocodile Dundee (1986) movie when it posed as the 59th Street–Columbus Circle station at the end of the movie. The "9" wall mosaics and the sunlight seen at the very end of the film made it clear it was Ninth Avenue. The abandoned lower level also appeared in a pivotal violent scene from the film Joker (2019). In the Heights (2021) used the abandoned subway platform for a key musical sequence, with vintage subway cars rented from the New York Transit Museum. Additionally, these platforms were featured in the March 3, 2024 episode of CBS's The Equalizer. A “9TH AVE” mosaic wall tablet was seen twice, while there was a ceiling-hung “Lexington-53rd St” sign. During this scene, a short train passes through, but does not stop.

=== Exits ===
The station house is at street level near the intersection of 9th Avenue and New Utrecht Avenue, and there is a sealed entrance on the west side. The tablet grilles in the mezzanine are still intact and a newsstand once stood opposite the current location of the station agent booth.

== Track layout ==
As the West End line rises from embankment to elevated east of this station, the BMT Culver right-of-way can be seen leaving the tunnel on the Manhattan-bound side. Only one track leaves the tunnel, dead-ending approximately 750 feet (230 m) later before Fort Hamilton Parkway with no further connections. There is also a platform present. The platform was installed in the late 1980s for New York City Transit employees only and is not part of the right-of-way.

To the west of the station is a complicated track layout complete with track connections from the Fourth Avenue Line, ramps from the now-demolished Fifth Avenue El, and ramps from the 36th–38th Street Yard, combining together to form the six tracks and two levels of the station.

Beyond the ramps, as the line curves under the BMT Fourth Avenue Line, there are tracks that continue straight into the piers on the Sunset Park waterfront that were once operated by the South Brooklyn Railway. In the tunnel approaching 36th Street station, there is an unused trackway that was supposed to connect to the South Brooklyn Railway. The tunnel connection was never built. This trackway merges to the southbound track and runs for a long distance before ending at a wall.

== Gallery ==
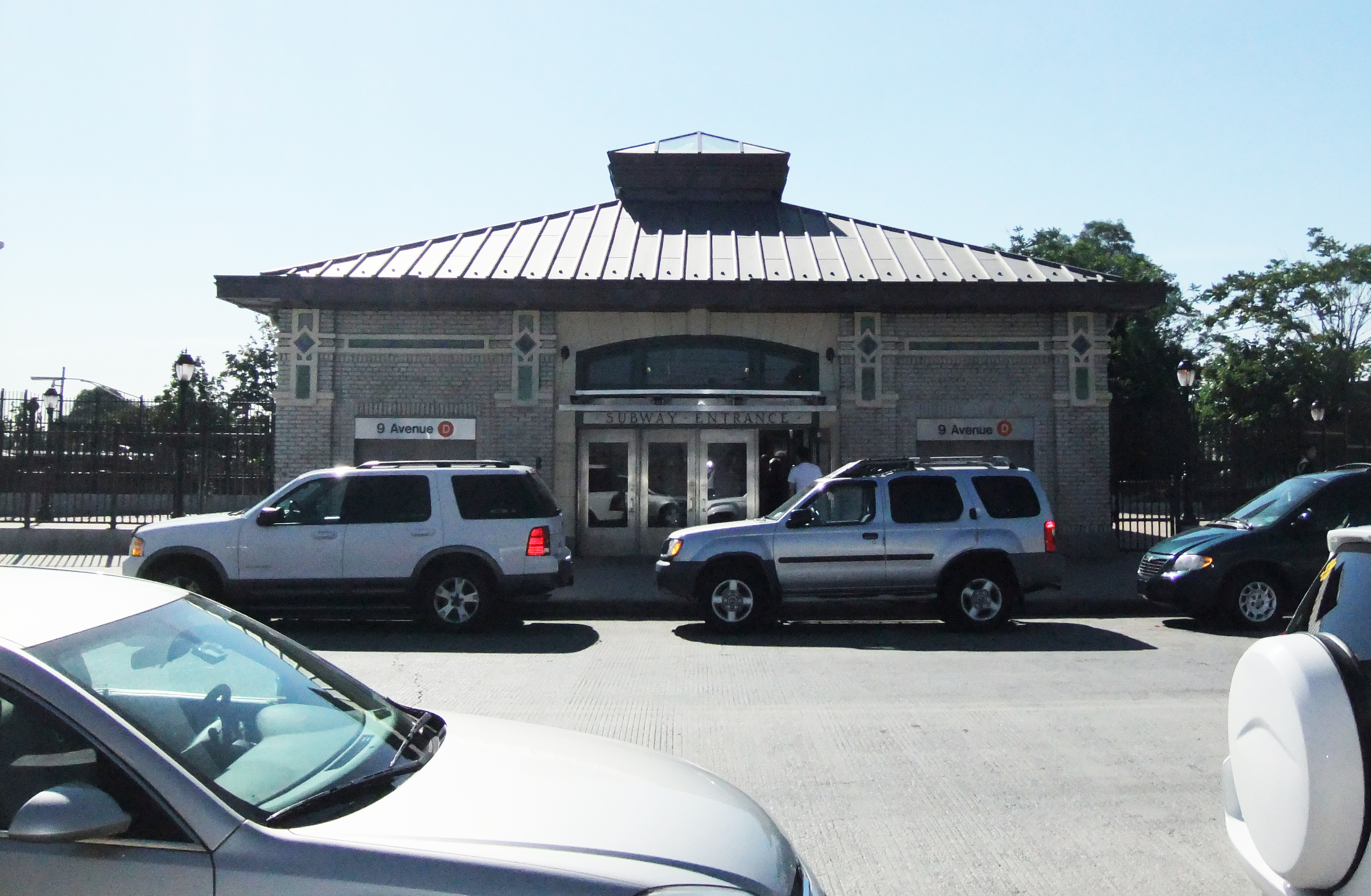
Station house

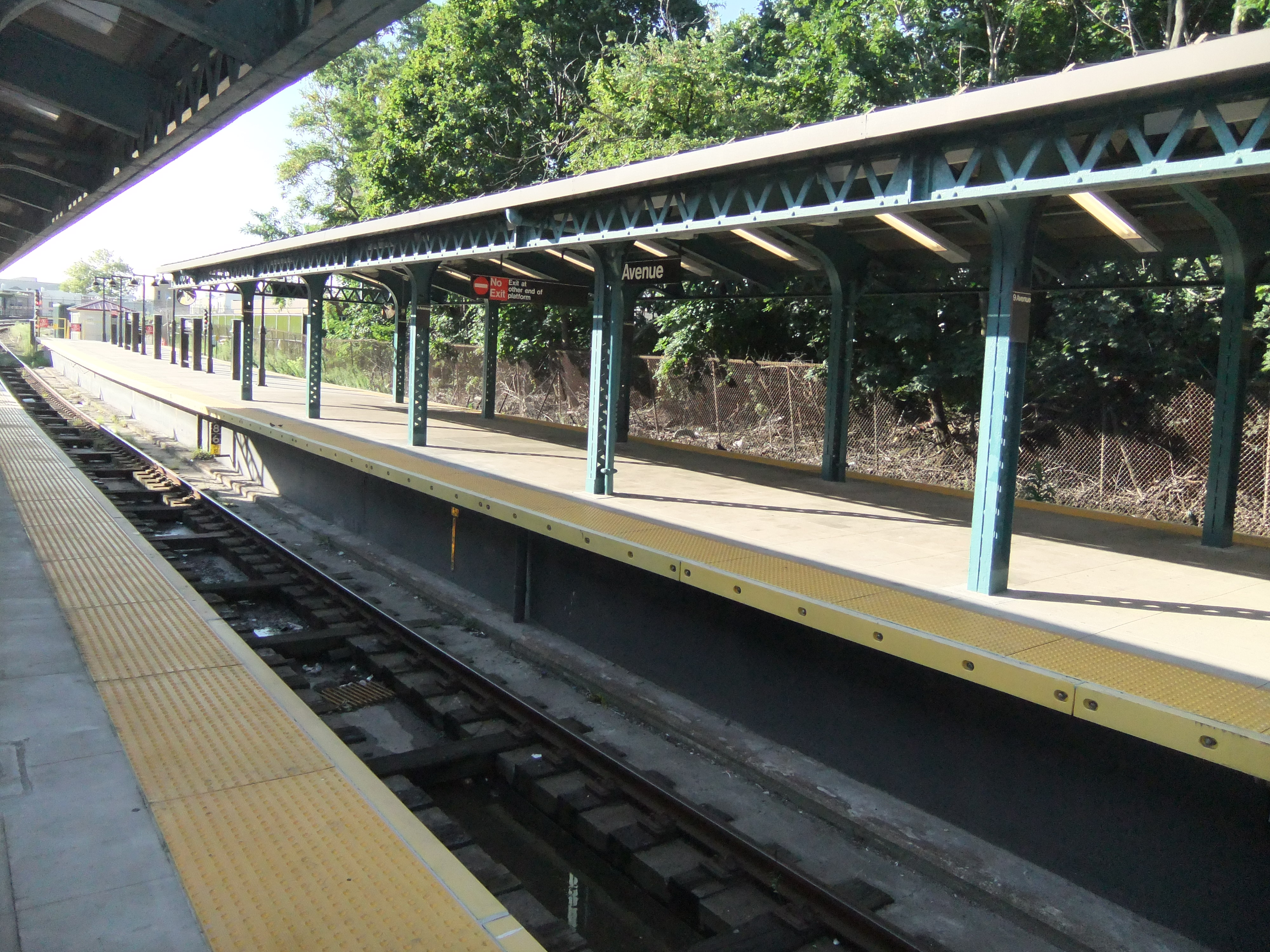
Coney Island bound platform

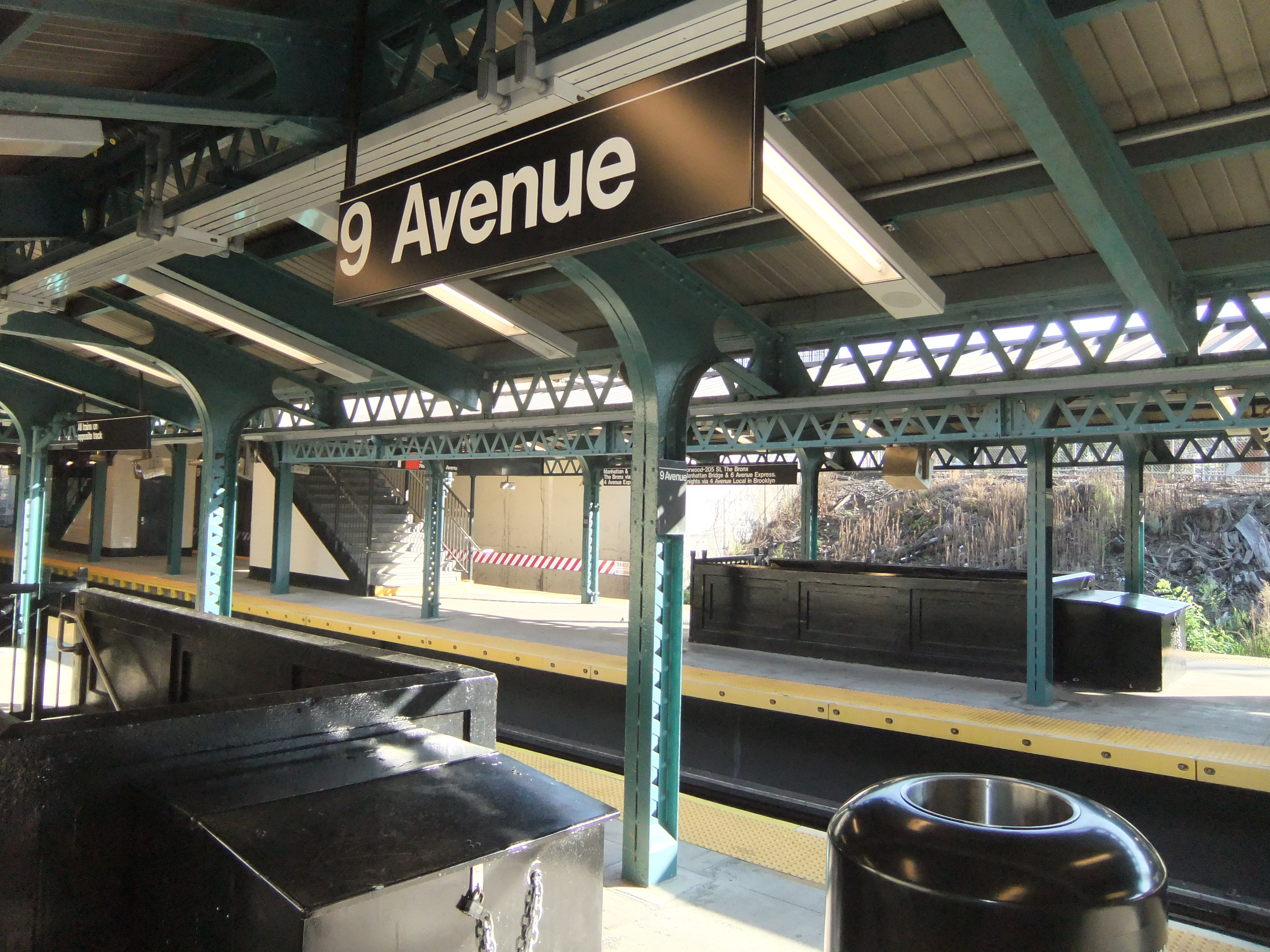
Manhattan bound platform

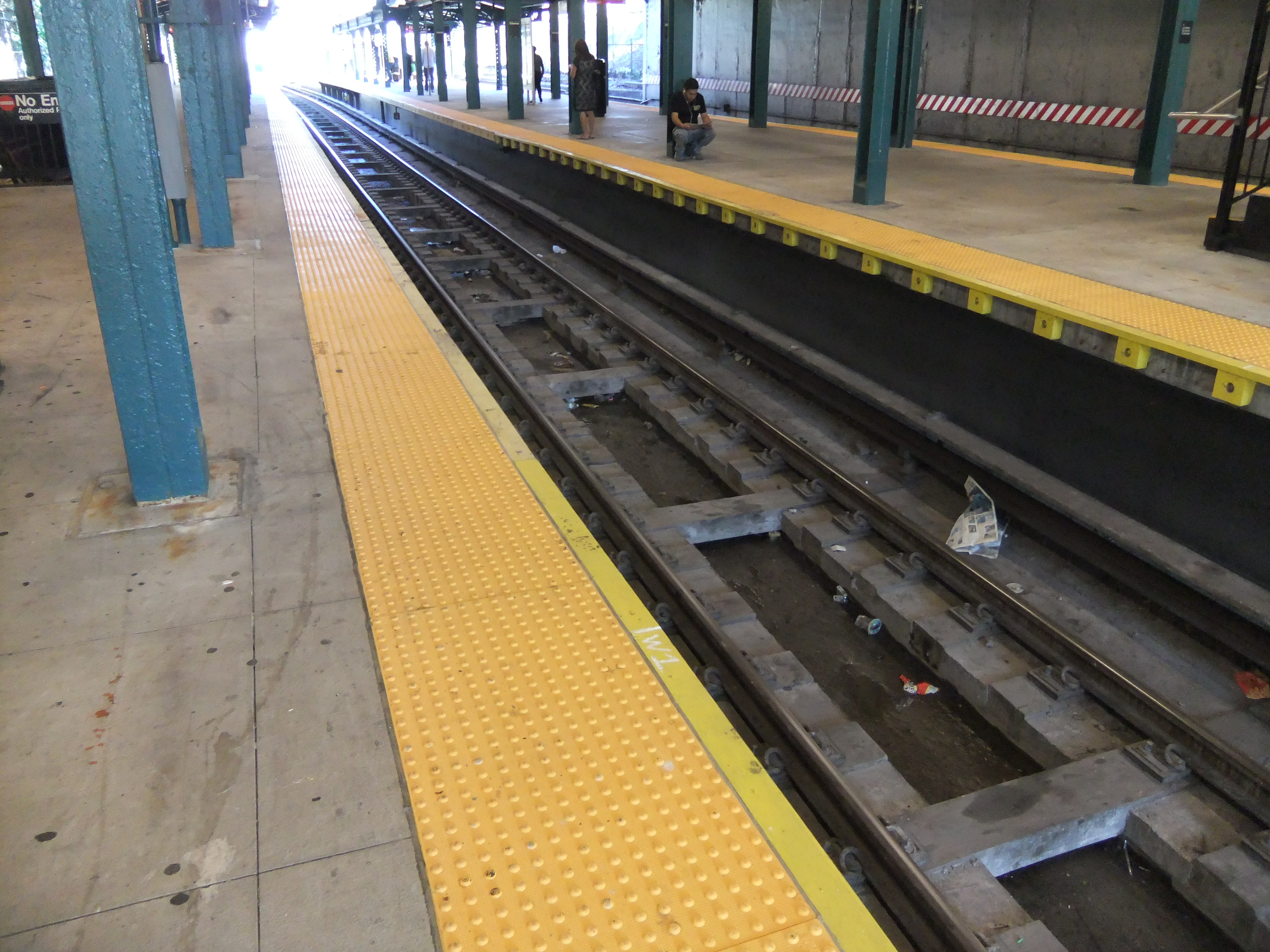
The express track

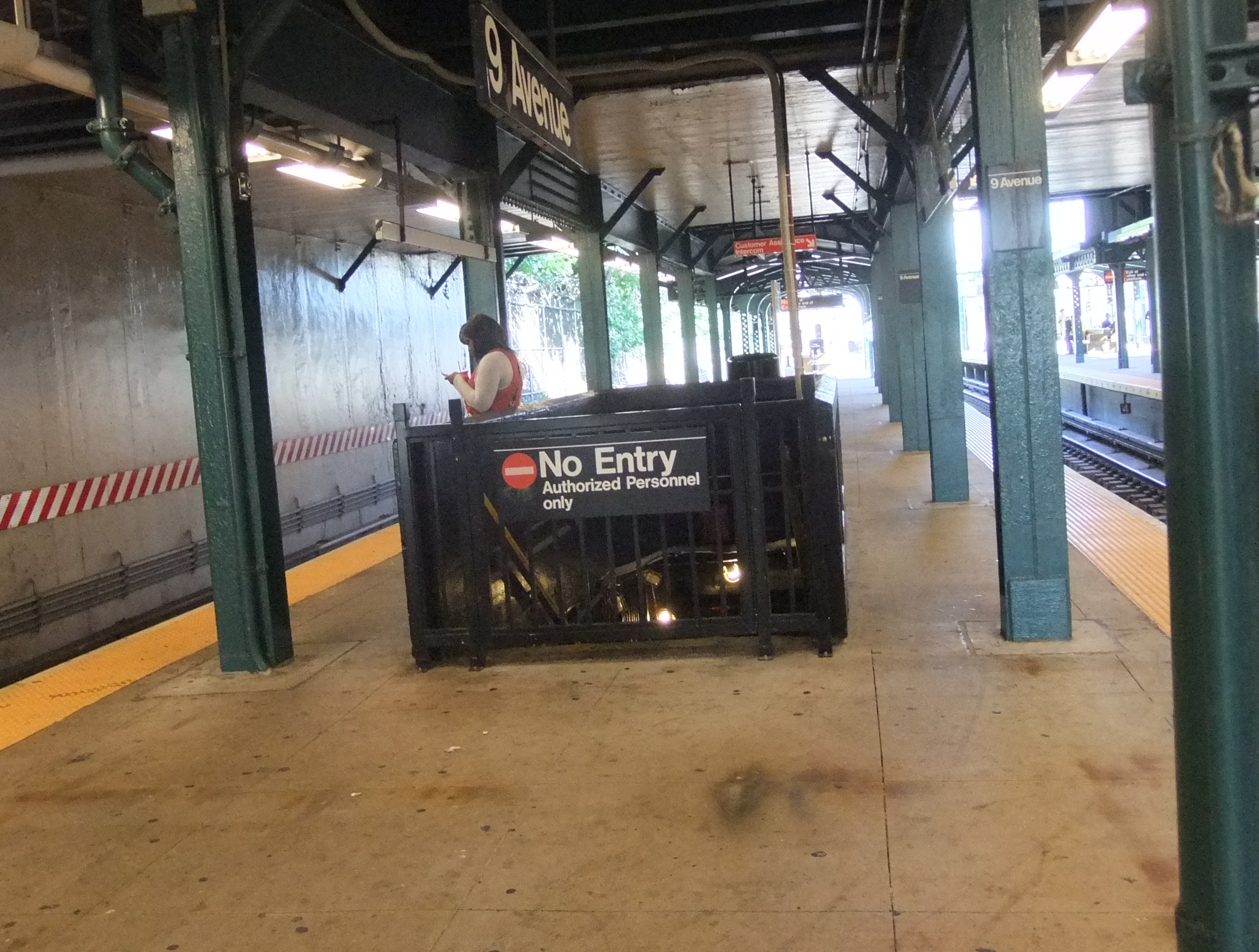
Staircase to the lower level

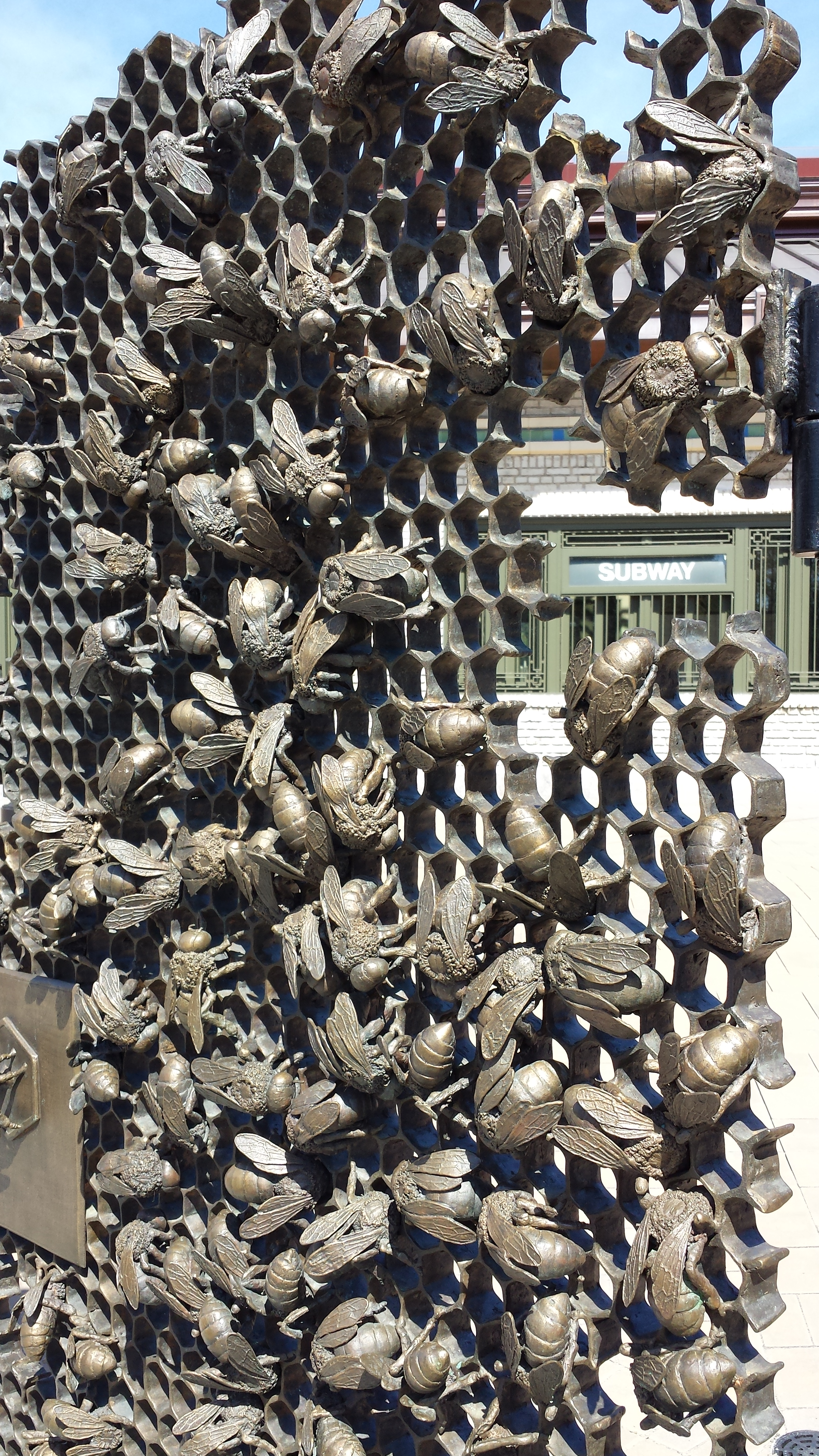
Detail of decorative gate by Christopher Russell

== See also ==
- National Register of Historic Places listings in Brooklyn
