= 55th Street station =

New York City Subway station in Brooklyn

55 Street
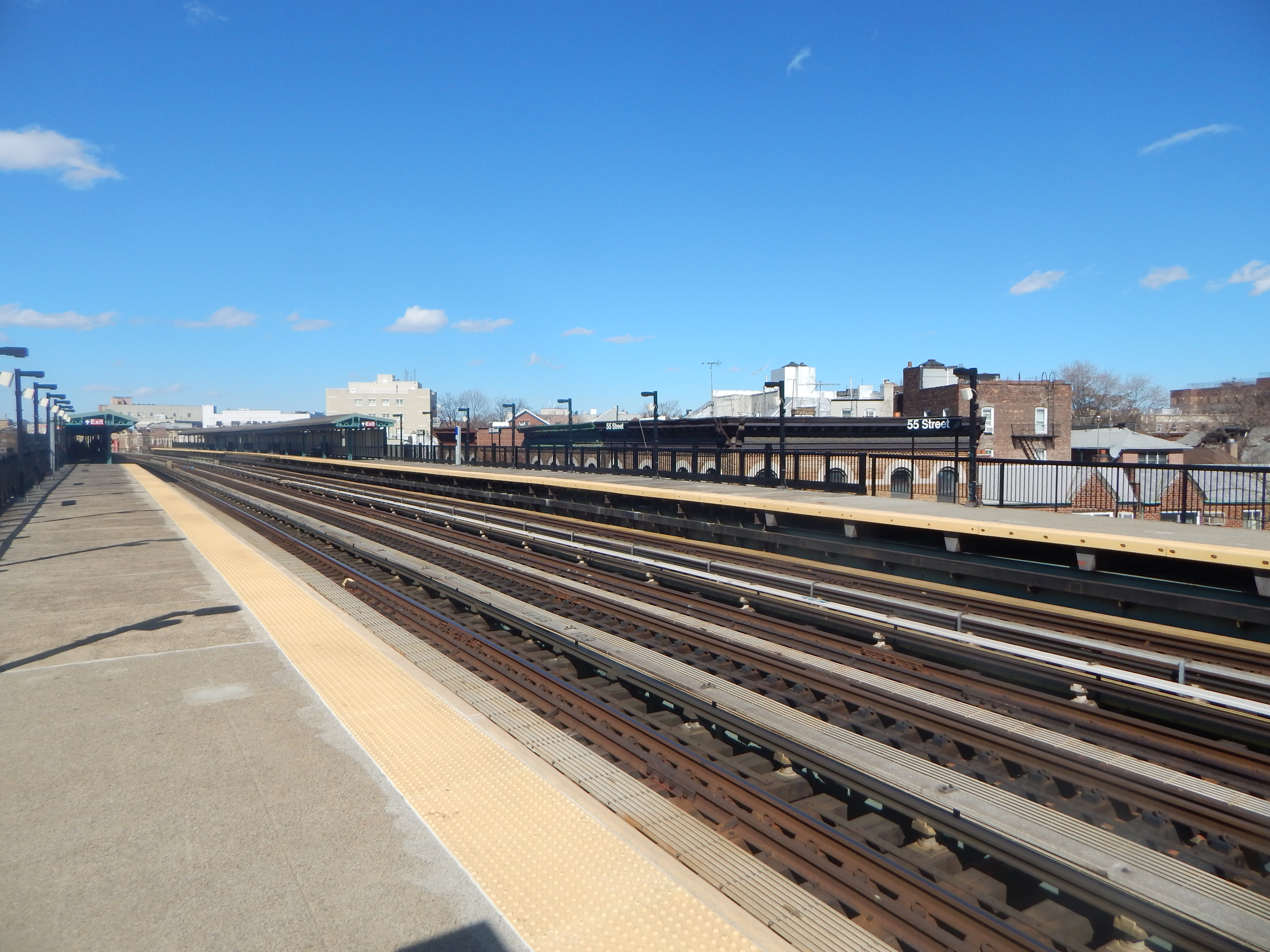

Station statistics
- Address: 55th Street, 13th Avenue & New Utrecht Avenue; Brooklyn, New York
- Borough: Brooklyn
- Locale: Borough Park
- Coordinates: 40.631892°N 73.995709°W
- Division: B (BMT)
- Line: BMT West End Line
- Services: D (all times)
- Transit: NYCT Bus: B16
- Structure: Elevated
- Platforms: 2 side platforms
- Tracks: 3 (2 in regular service)

Other information
- Opened: June 24, 1916 (110 years ago)

Traffic
- 2025: 423,819 ▲0.1%
- Rank: 402 out of 423
Services
| Preceding station | New York City Subway | Following station |
|---|---|---|
| 50th Street toward Norwood–205th Street | Local | 62nd Street toward Coney Island–Stillwell Avenue |
and do not stop here
Location
Location within New York City Subway
Location within New York City
Location within New York
Track layout
Street map
Station service legend
| Symbol | Description |
| Stops all times | Stops all times |

The 55th Street station is a local station on the BMT West End Line of the New York City Subway, located at the intersection of 55th Street, 13th Avenue and New Utrecht Avenue in Borough Park, Brooklyn. It is served by the D train at all times. The station opened in 1916, and had its platforms extended in the 1960s.

== History ==
55th Street station opened on June 24, 1916 along with the first portion of the BMT West End Line from 36th Street on the BMT Fourth Avenue Line to 18th Avenue station. The line was originally a surface excursion railway to Coney Island, called the Brooklyn, Bath and Coney Island Railroad, which was established in 1862, but did not reach Coney Island until 1864. Under the Dual Contracts of 1913, an elevated line was built over New Utrecht Avenue, 86th Street and Stillwell Avenue.

The platforms at the station were extended in the 1960s to 615 feet (187 m) to accommodate ten-car trains.

The station house was renovated as part of the Metropolitan Transportation Authority's 2005-2009 Capital Program. Square windows were installed in the mezzanine and chain link fences separate the street stairs from the platform ones.

== Station layout ==
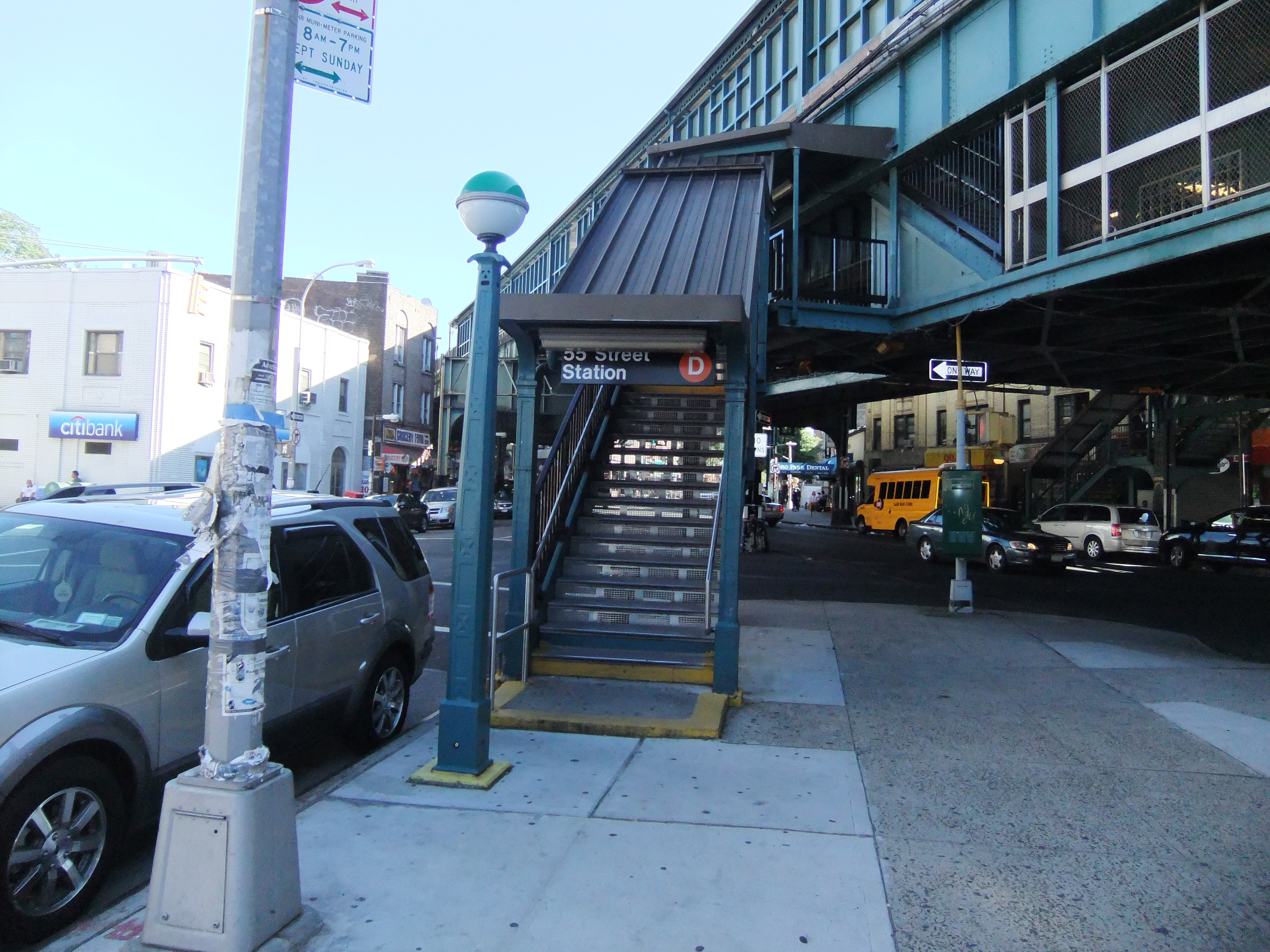
Southwestern street stair

This elevated station has three tracks and two side platforms. The D train stops here at all times, and the center express track is not normally used in service. Both platforms have beige windscreens and brown canopies with green frames and support columns along their entire lengths except for the sections at either ends. Here, they have waist-high black steel fences with lampposts at regular intervals. The station signs are in the standard black plates in white lettering.

=== Exits ===
The station's only entrance/exit is an elevated station house beneath the tracks. It has three staircases from the streets, one on the northeast corner of 55th Street and New Utrecht Avenue and two to either southern corners. Inside the station house, there is a token booth, turnstiles and two staircases to each platform at the center. The waiting area inside fare control allows free transfer between directions.
