= Sixth Avenue Express =

Sixth Avenue Express is the name of the following subway services in New York City, that run from Upper Manhattan and the Bronx, through Sixth Avenue in Manhattan, to Brooklyn:

- Sixth Avenue/Brighton Express or B (New York City Subway service)
- Sixth Avenue Express/West End Local or D (New York City Subway service)
