= 50th Street station (BMT West End Line) =

New York City Subway station in Brooklyn

50 Street
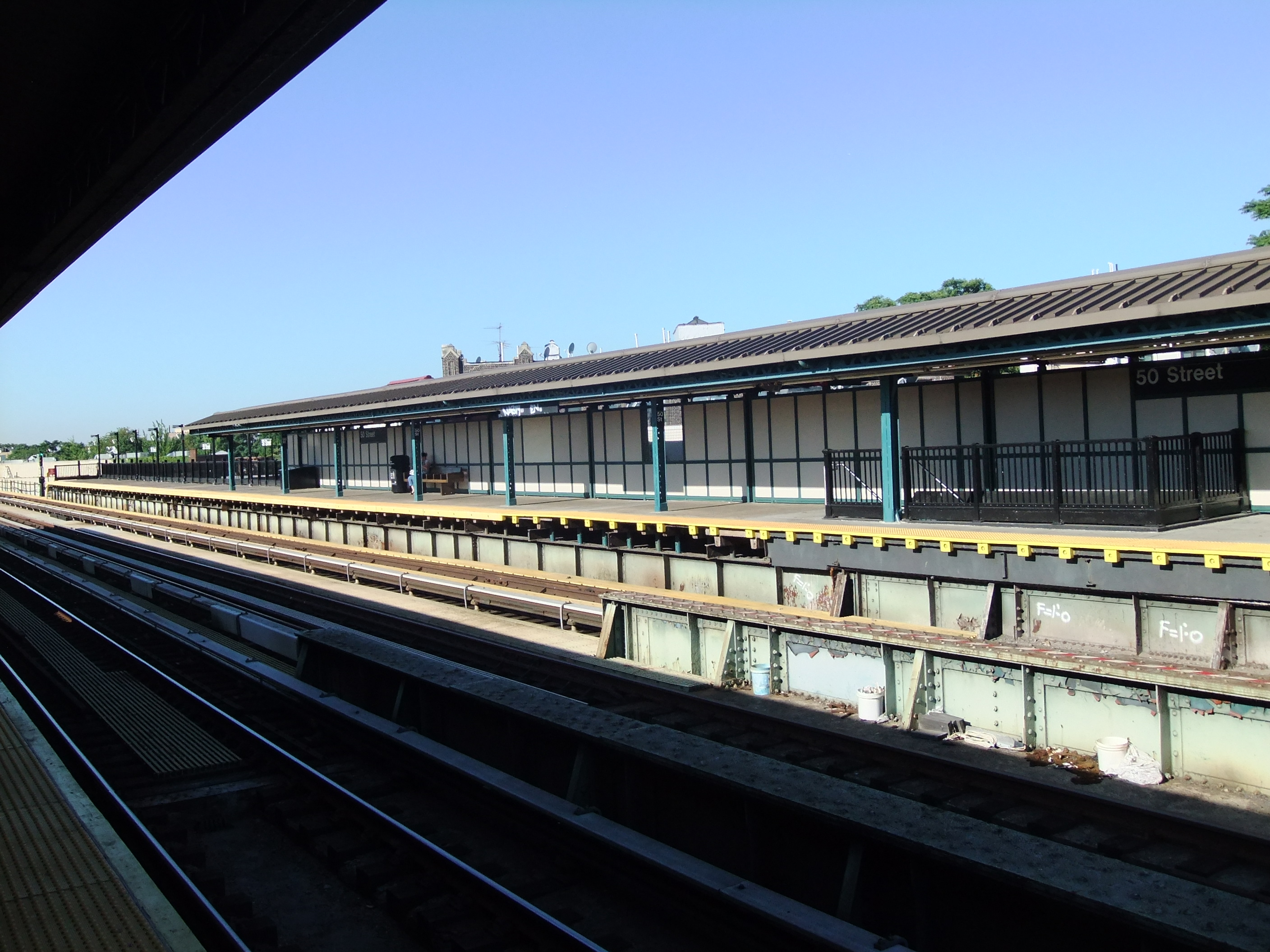
- View of the Brooklyn-bound platform

Station statistics
- Address: 50th Street, 12th Avenue & New Utrecht Avenue; Brooklyn, New York
- Borough: Brooklyn
- Locale: Borough Park
- Coordinates: 40.63611°N 73.99498°W
- Division: B (BMT)
- Line: BMT West End Line
- Services: D (all times)
- Transit: NYCT Bus: B11; Private Transportation Co.: B110
- Structure: Elevated
- Platforms: 2 side platforms
- Tracks: 3 (2 in regular service)

Other information
- Opened: June 24, 1916 (110 years ago)

Traffic
- 2025: 779,016 ▲1.5%
- Rank: 345 out of 423
Services
Preceding station	New York City Subway	Following station
Fort Hamilton Parkway toward Norwood–205th Street	Local	55th Street toward Coney Island–Stillwell Avenue
and do not stop here
Location
Location within New York City Subway
Location within New York City
Location within New York
Track layout
Street map
Station service legend
Symbol	Description
Stops all times	Stops all times

The 50th Street station is a local station on the BMT West End Line of the New York City Subway, located at the intersection of 50th Street, 12th Avenue and New Utrecht Avenue in Borough Park, Brooklyn. It is served by the D train at all times. The station opened in 1916, and had its platforms extended in the 1960s.

== History ==
50th Street station opened on June 24, 1916, along with the first portion of the BMT West End Line from 36th Street on the BMT Fourth Avenue Line to 18th Avenue station. The line was originally a surface excursion railway to Coney Island, called the Brooklyn, Bath and Coney Island Railroad, which was established in 1862, but did not reach Coney Island until 1864. Under the Dual Contracts of 1913, an elevated line was built over New Utrecht Avenue, 86th Street and Stillwell Avenue.

The platforms at the station were extended in the 1960s to 615 feet (187 m) to accommodate ten-car trains.

== Station layout ==
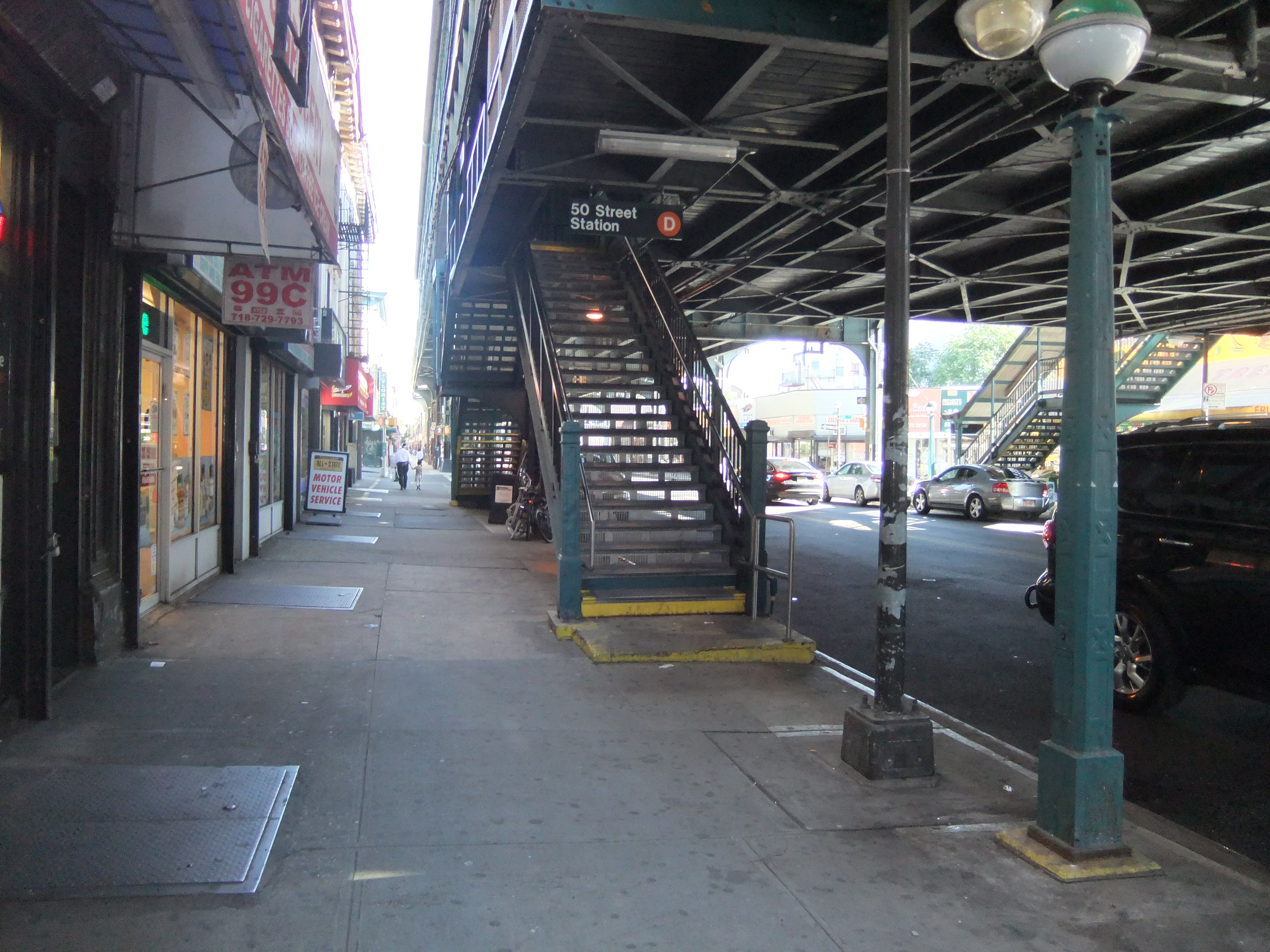
Southwestern street stair

This elevated station has three tracks and two side platforms. The D train stops here at all times, and the center express track is not normally used in service.

The platforms have beige windscreens and brown canopies with green frames at their center and waist-high black steel fences at either end. They are offset; the Manhattan-bound platform is more to the north than the Coney Island-bound one and both have electrical distribution rooms at either end.

=== Exits ===
The station's only entrance is via an elevated station house beneath the tracks that has four street stairs, two to either side of New Utrecht Avenue between 49th and 50th Streets. The station house has cherry red doors, a clad wood trim exterior, and beige interior. There are also glass block windows and heaters. The fare control consists of a token booth, turnstile bank, waiting area and two staircases to each platform at their center.
