= 62nd Street/New Utrecht Avenue station =

New York City Subway station in Brooklyn

62 Street/New Utrecht Avenue
- New York City Subway station complex
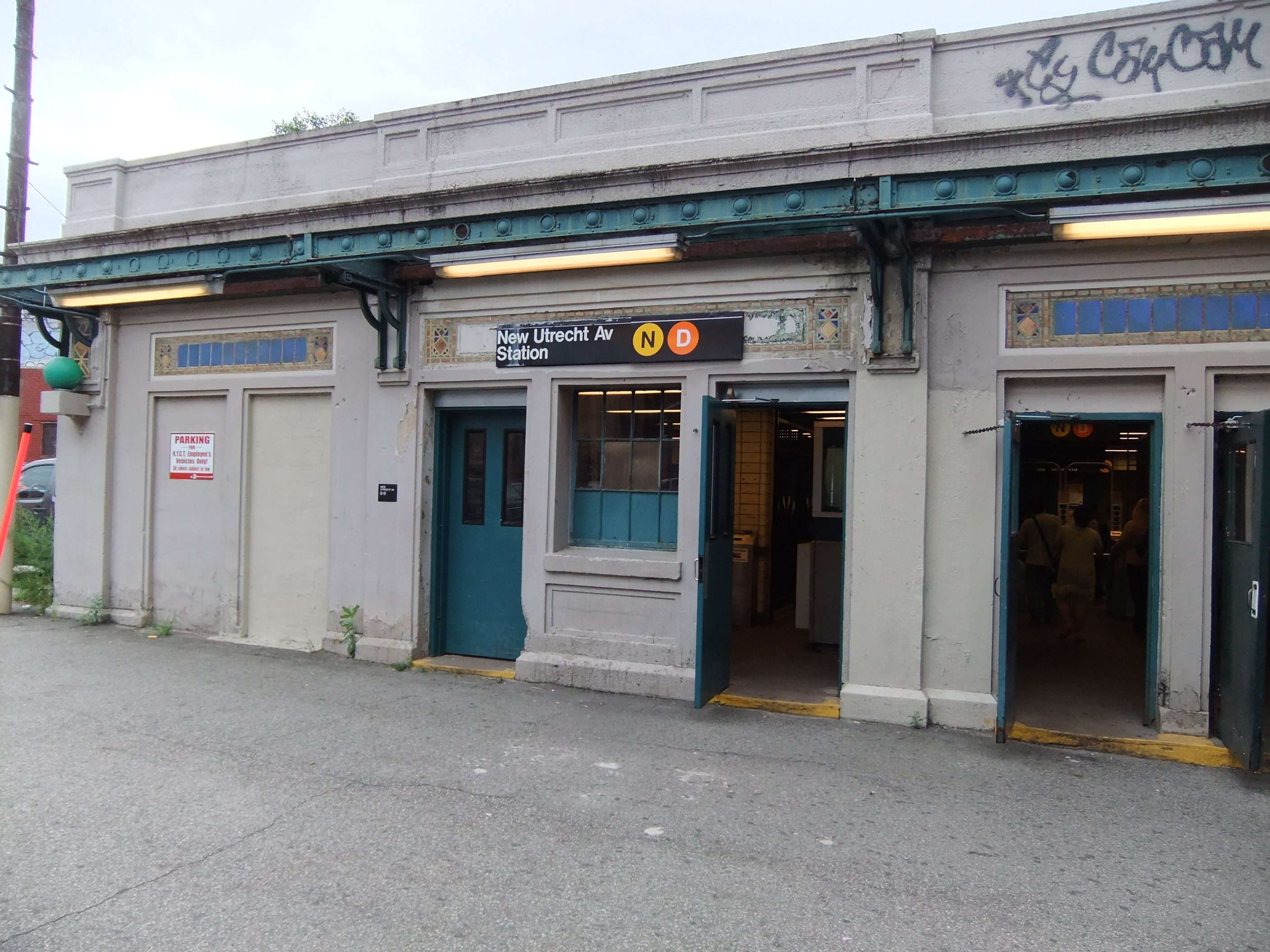
- The station's main headhouse prior to renovation

Station statistics
- Address: New Utrecht Avenue & 62nd Street; Brooklyn, New York
- Borough: Brooklyn
- Locale: Bensonhurst, Borough Park
- Coordinates: 40.626086°N 73.997887°W
- Division: B (BMT)
- Line: BMT Sea Beach Line; BMT West End Line
- Services: D (all times); R (one southbound a.m. rush-hour trip); N (all times); W (selected rush-hour trips)
- Transit: NYCT Bus: B9
- Levels: 2

Other information
- Accessible: Yes

Traffic
- 2025: 1,200,551 ▲4%
- Rank: 278 out of 423
Location
Location within New York City Subway
Location within New York City
Location within New York
Street map
Station service legend
Symbol	Description
Stops all times	Stops all times
Stops rush hours only	Stops rush hours only
Stops rush hours in the peak direction only	Stops rush hours in the peak direction only

The 62nd Street/New Utrecht Avenue station is a New York City Subway station complex shared by the open-cut BMT Sea Beach Line and the elevated BMT West End Line. It is located at New Utrecht Avenue and 62nd Street in Borough Park and Bensonhurst, Brooklyn, and is served by the D and N trains at all times. During rush hours, several W trains and one southbound R train also serve this station.

Prior to the rebuilding of the two current subway lines at this location during the 1910s, this location was known as Bath Junction. Until then, there was a track connection between the lines, primarily to enable Sea Beach trains to and from Coney Island to access West End Line trackage to reach the Brooklyn Bridge and the Park Row Terminal in Lower Manhattan. From 2016 to 2019, the complex underwent an extensive renovation.

== History ==
=== Bath Junction ===
Bath Junction was located near the present site of the station. It took the name as a railroad junction of the New York & Sea Beach Railway (Sea Beach Line) with the Brooklyn, Bath Coney Island Railroad (West End Line). The NY&SB called the station at the junction Bath Junction, while the BB&CI called it Sea Beach Junction. Soon, however, they settled on the common name. Bath Junction was located at grade near the current intersection of New Utrecht Avenue and 62nd Street.

The junction included a switching track connecting the two lines, so that NY&SB trains might reach the Brooklyn Bridge via the BB&CI tracks. Both lines merged with the BMT Culver Line at Ninth Avenue and later the BMT Fifth Avenue Line and BMT Myrtle Avenue Line.

After both lines were rebuilt as rapid transit lines of the Brooklyn Rapid Transit Company, the name "Bath Junction" was dropped. A connector was no longer necessary, as the West End Line was able to reach Manhattan on its own, and was not even realistic to plan, as one line dropped into a cut and the other became elevated. The multi-level station complex was created to allow passenger transfer between the two lines.

=== Dual Contracts improvements ===
The West End Line platforms opened on June 24, 1916 along with the first portion of the BMT West End Line from 36th Street on the BMT Fourth Avenue Line to 18th Avenue station. The line was originally a surface excursion railway to Coney Island, called the Brooklyn, Bath and Coney Island Railroad, which was established in 1862, but did not reach Coney Island until 1864. Under the Dual Contracts of 1913, an elevated line was built over New Utrecht Avenue, 86th Street and Stillwell Avenue.

=== Later history ===
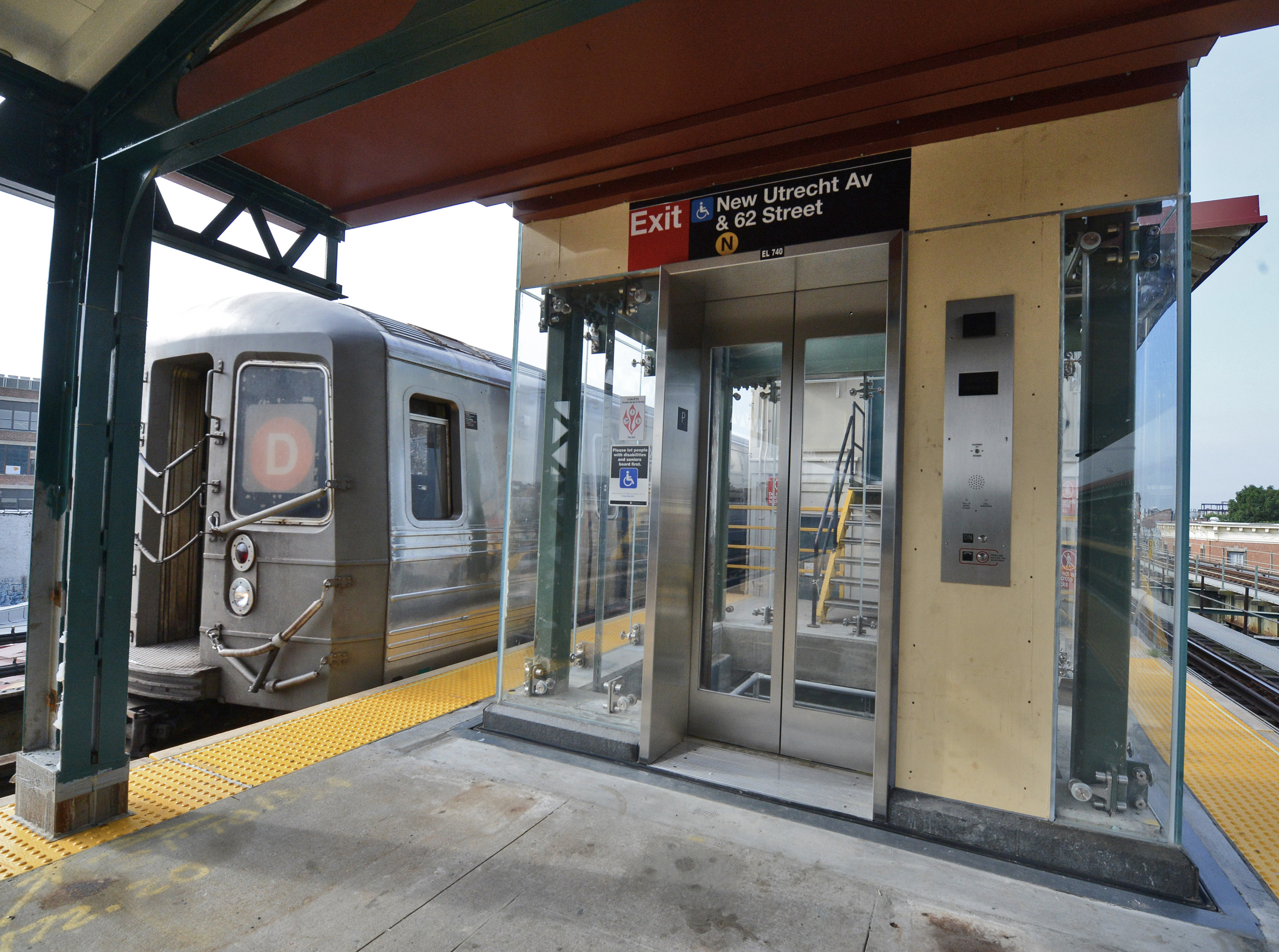
Elevator from the northbound West End Line platform, with an R68 D train arriving

As of 2018, the complex had 4,673 paying riders on a typical weekday, equating to 1,503,742 total riders in 2018.

From October 2010 to May 2012, the West End Line station was renovated with two new fare controls, new canopy and platform edges, and repainted side roof and beams.

As part of a renovation project at nine stations along the Sea Beach Line, the Manhattan-bound platform at this Sea Beach Line station was closed from January 18, 2016 to May 22, 2017. The Coney Island-bound platform was closed from July 31, 2017 to July 1, 2019.

This entire station complex, along with eight other stations along the Sea Beach Line, underwent a rehabilitation involving the installation of 4 ADA-accessible elevators from 2015 to July 2019. The transfer between the two stations was closed until July 2019 for installation of the elevators; an out-of-system transfer was provided. The project to make the station ADA-accessible was originally proposed to be completed in spring 2019. At one point, construction was expected to continue until October, but the elevators entered service on July 19, 2019.

Plans for the Interborough Express, a light rail line using the Bay Ridge Branch right of way, were announced in 2023. As part of the project, a light rail station at New Utrecht Avenue has been proposed next to the existing subway station.

== BMT West End Line platforms ==
62 Street
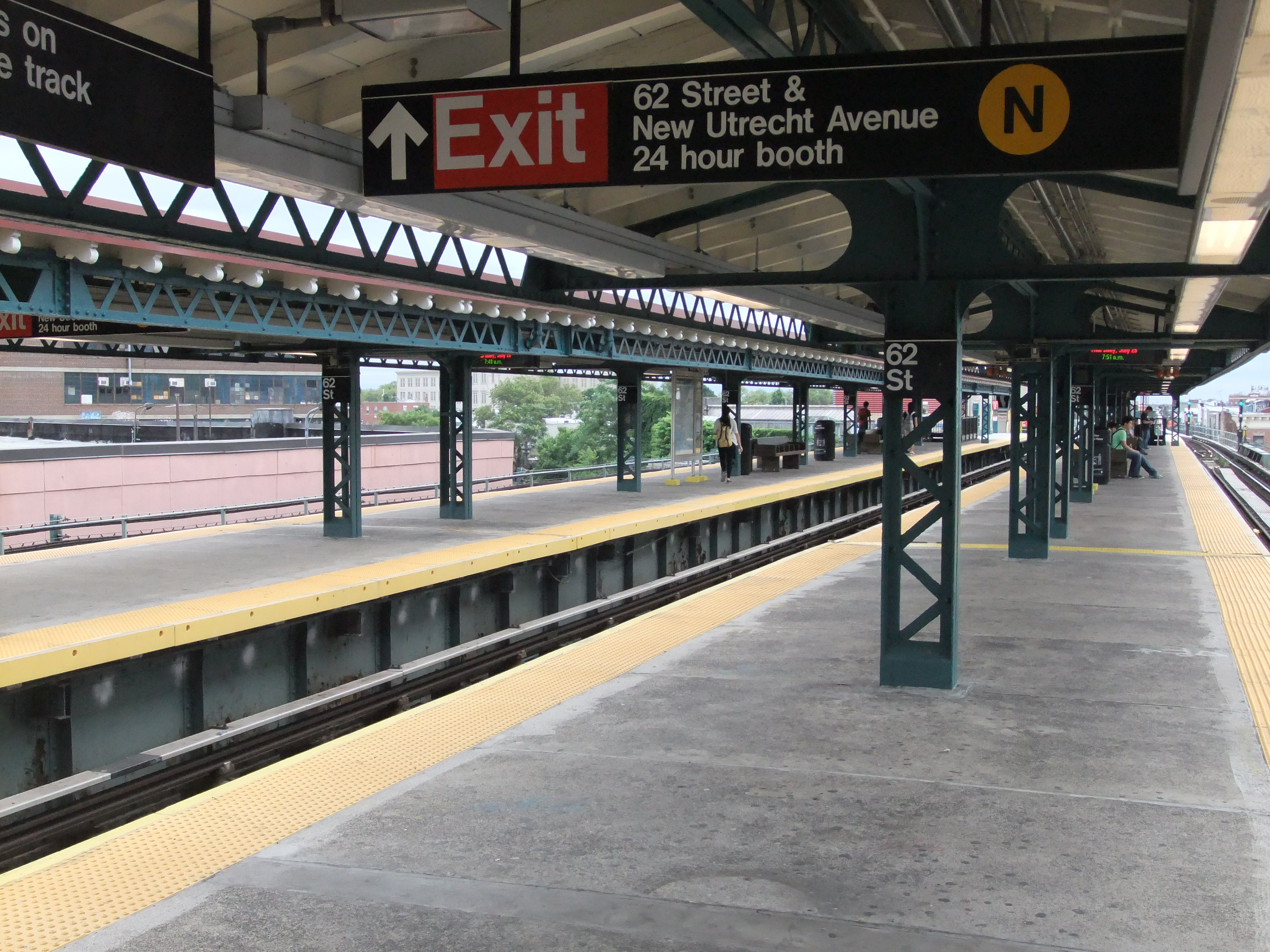
- View from the southbound platform

Station statistics
- Division: B (BMT)
- Line: BMT West End Line
- Services: D (all times); R (one southbound a.m. rush-hour trip); W (two southbound a.m. rush-hour trips)
- Structure: Elevated
- Platforms: 2 island platforms cross-platform interchange
- Tracks: 3 (2 in regular service)

Other information
- Opened: June 24, 1916; 110 years ago
- Accessible: Yes
Services
Preceding station	New York City Subway	Following station
55th Street D toward Norwood–205th Street	Local	71st Street D toward Coney Island–Stillwell Avenue
Ninth Avenue One-way operation	no regular service	Bay Parkway R W express
Track layout
Station service legend
Symbol	Description
Stops all times	Stops all times
Stops rush hours in the peak direction only	Stops rush hours in the peak direction only

The 62nd Street station is an express station on the BMT West End Line that has three tracks and two island platforms. Effective June 2025, the middle express track is used by one southbound R train and two southbound W trains during the morning rush hour. The next station to the north is 55th Street, while the next station to the south is 71st Street.

=== Exits ===
There are two fare control areas. The full-time side is at 62nd Street (south end of station) and has the transfer to the BMT Sea Beach Line. The part-time side is at 60th Street (north end). The 60th Street exit is where the famous chase scene in the 1971 film The French Connection ends. This side was renovated and is HEET access for most of the day. A booth formerly existed here, but is now mostly empty space in the station house. New windows and lighting restored this mezzanine to good condition. However, the staircases from the street still have wooden boards. The station-house for the BMT Sea Beach Line used to have a newsstand and two additional doors on the left side.

On the street, the southern station entrance is set back from New Utrecht Avenue. It is to the left when facing the Tomche Shabbos food pantry warehouse; there is a small, fenced-in overgrown area separating them, with a small MTA informational sign on the chain link. The station house is also visible from 62nd Street, but there is a small MTA lot for separating street from station, designated for bus turnarounds, MTA maintenance, and MTA employee parking only. A staircase leads to the second floor of the station house, where a covered, open-air passageway provides access the south ends of the elevated platforms.

== BMT Sea Beach Line platforms ==
New Utrecht Avenue
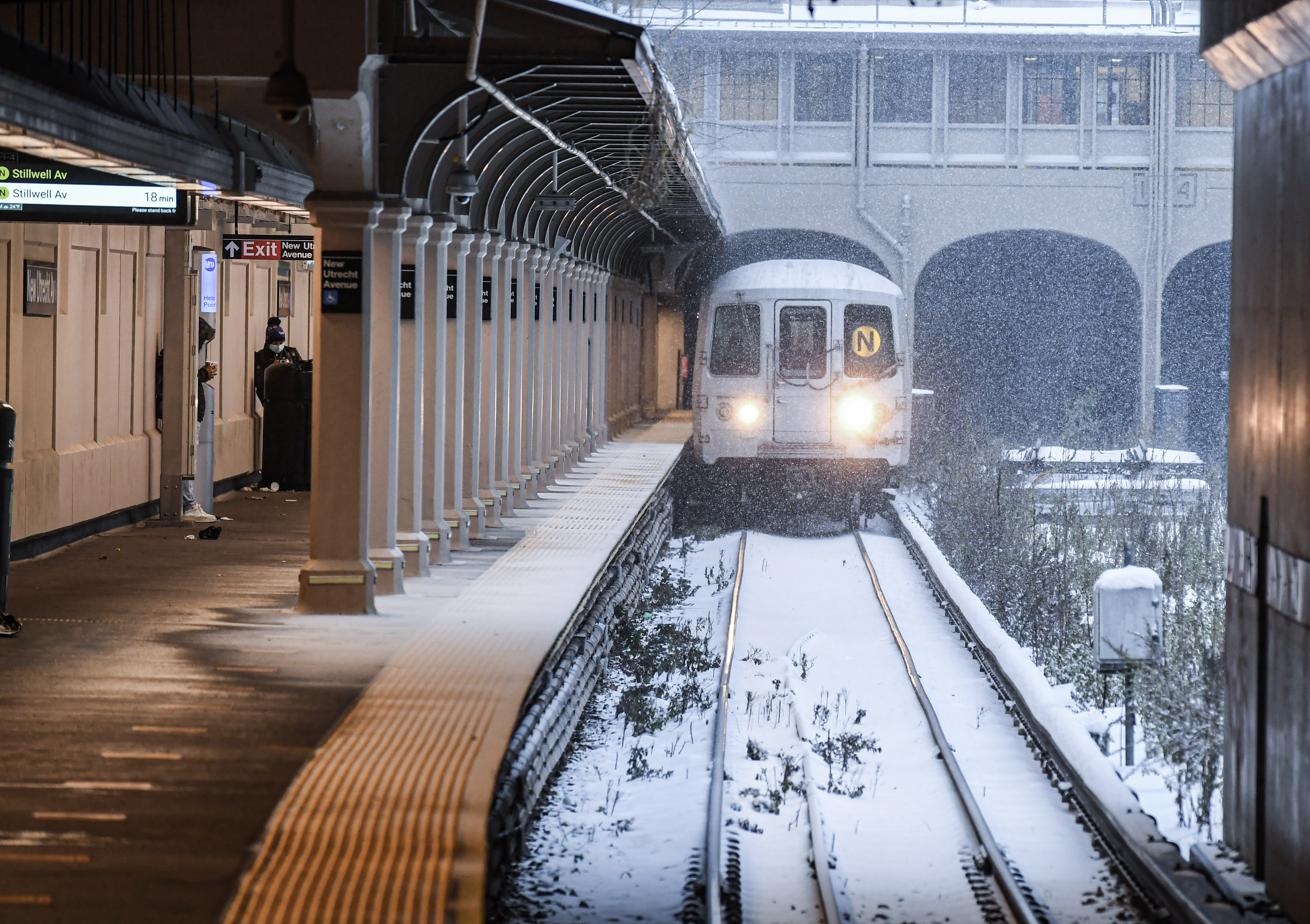
- R46 N train arriving at the southbound platform

Station statistics
- Division: B (BMT)
- Line: BMT Sea Beach Line
- Services: N (all times); W (selected rush-hour trips)
- Structure: Open-cut
- Platforms: 2 side platforms
- Tracks: 4 (2 in regular service)

Other information
- Opened: June 22, 1915; 111 years ago
- Accessible: Yes
Services
Preceding station	New York City Subway	Following station
Fort Hamilton Parkway N W toward Astoria–Ditmars Boulevard	Local	18th Avenue N W toward Coney Island–Stillwell Avenue
Track layout
Station service legend
Symbol	Description
Stops all times	Stops all times
Stops rush hours only	Stops rush hours only
Stops rush hours in the peak direction only	Stops rush hours in the peak direction only
- New Utrecht Avenue Station (Dual System BRT)
- U.S. National Register of Historic Places
- New York State Register of Historic Places
- MPS: New York City Subway System MPS
- NRHP reference No.: 05000678
- NYSRHP No.: 04701.013857

Significant dates
- Added to NRHP: July 6, 2005
- Designated NYSRHP: May 11, 2005

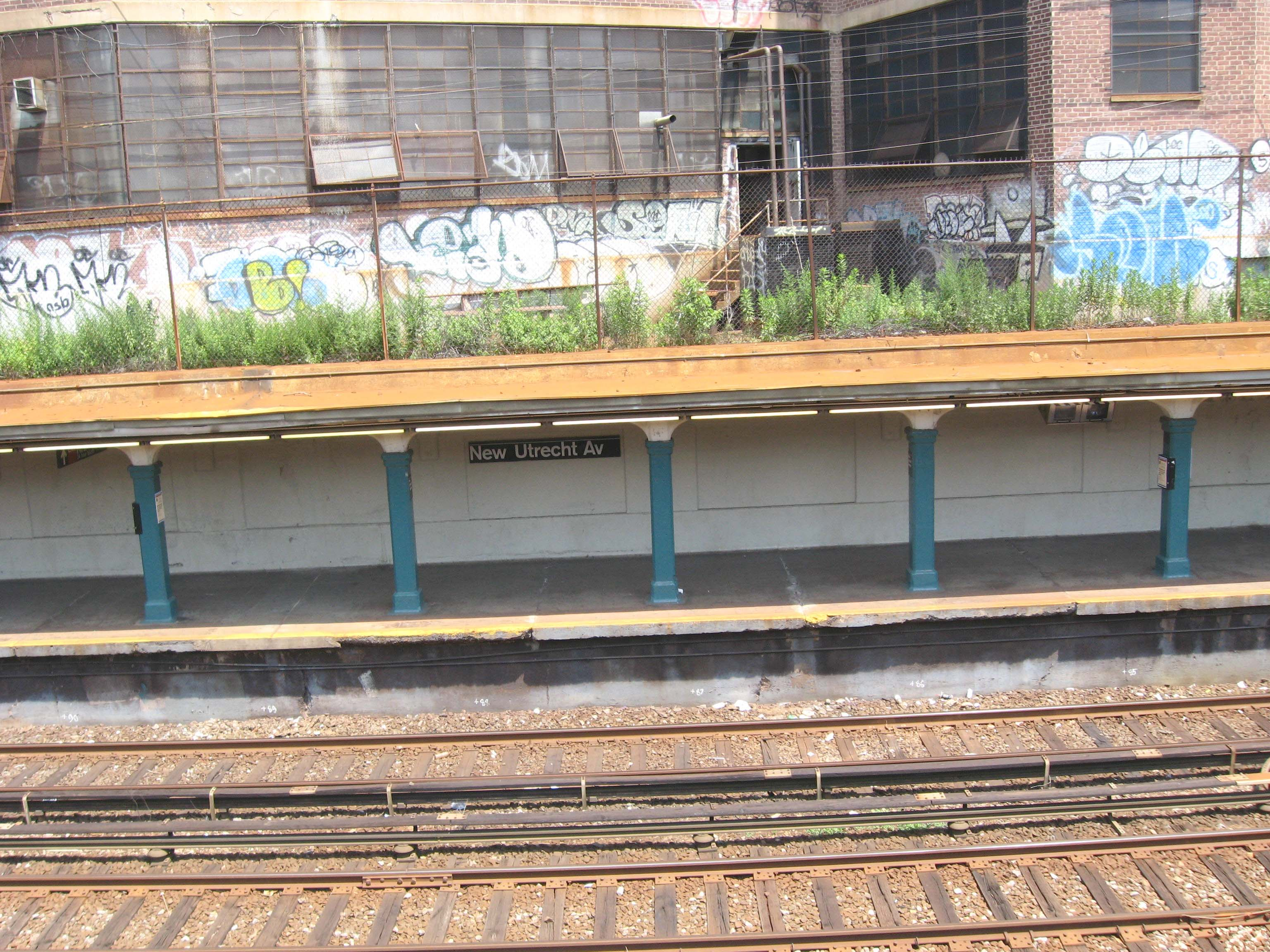
Northbound platform prior to renovation

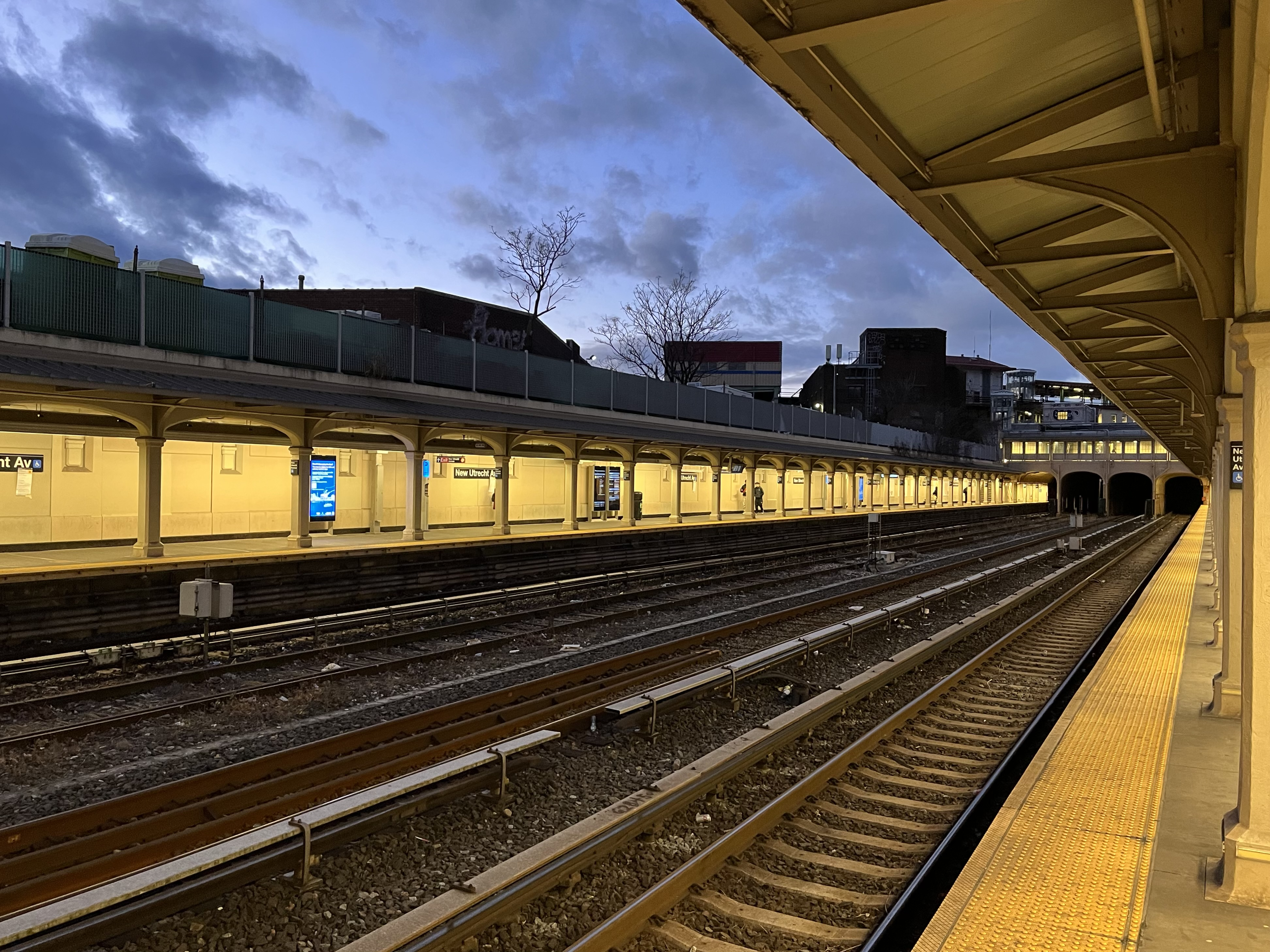
Looking west from the same platform, after renovation

The New Utrecht Avenue station on the BMT Sea Beach Line has four tracks and two side platforms. Platform extensions are to the north end of the station and beyond the main staircase. Although most of the station is in an open cut, both ends of both platforms are underneath tunnels. This segment of the station has been listed on the National Register of Historic Places since 2005.

Geographically east of the station, a track connection to a siding that served the Rubel Ice Company once existed; this connection was removed in the 1930s. The siding was connected to the Manhattan-bound track.

=== Exits ===
The north end has two staircases to the full-time booth, where the transfer to the elevated BMT West End Line is available. The south end at 15th Avenue and 63rd Street is HEET access and formerly had a booth. The north end has unusual bricks on the staircase walls, suggesting the staircases were redone when the platform was extended. The original entrance had only one staircase to platform level. After the platform extension, the staircase was redone in a T formation along with the installation of brick walls.

== See also ==
- National Register of Historic Places listings in Brooklyn
