= D (New York City Subway service) =

Rapid transit service

- Sixth Avenue Express

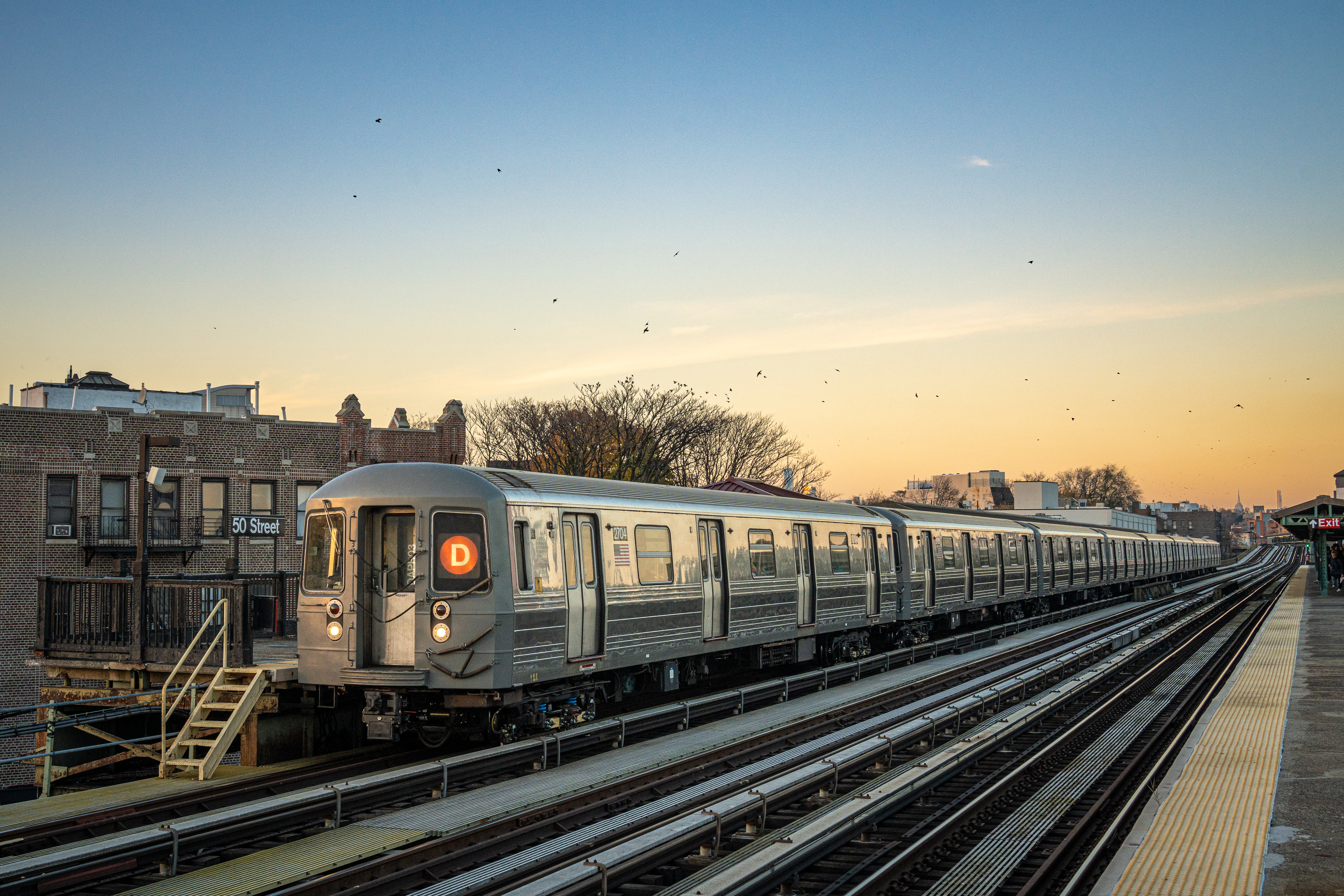
- A Coney Island-bound D train of R68 cars at 50th Street

- Northern end: Norwood–205th Street
- Southern end: Coney Island–Stillwell Avenue
- Stations: 36; 30 (rush hour service); 41 (late night service)
- Rolling stock: R68; R211A (Rolling stock assignments subject to change)
- Depot: Concourse Yard
- Started service: December 15, 1940; 85 years ago

The D Sixth Avenue Express is a rapid transit service in the B Division of the New York City Subway. Its route emblem, or "bullet", is colored orange, since it uses the IND Sixth Avenue Line as its main trunk line in Manhattan.

The D operates 24 hours daily between 205th Street in Norwood, Bronx, and Stillwell Avenue in Coney Island, Brooklyn. Daytime service makes express stops in Manhattan, and in Brooklyn (between Atlantic Avenue and 36th Street) and also bypasses DeKalb Avenue. During rush hours in the peak direction, D service also makes express stops between Fordham Road in the Bronx and 145th Street in Manhattan. Overnight service is the same as daytime service, except all trains make all stops in Brooklyn and stops at DeKalb Avenue.

In its early years, the D ran to Chambers Street/Hudson Terminal in Lower Manhattan via the lower IND Eighth Avenue Line south of West 4th Street. From 1954 to 1967, the D ran via the IND Culver Line to Coney Island. With the completion of the Chrystie Street Connection, service was rerouted via the BMT Brighton Line, running there from 1967 to 2001. As part of the multi-year rebuilding of the Manhattan Bridge, a short-lived yellow D service ran via the BMT Broadway Line in Manhattan to the Brighton Line in Brooklyn, while orange D service used the Sixth Avenue, Central Park West, and Concourse Lines in Manhattan and the Bronx.

== History ==
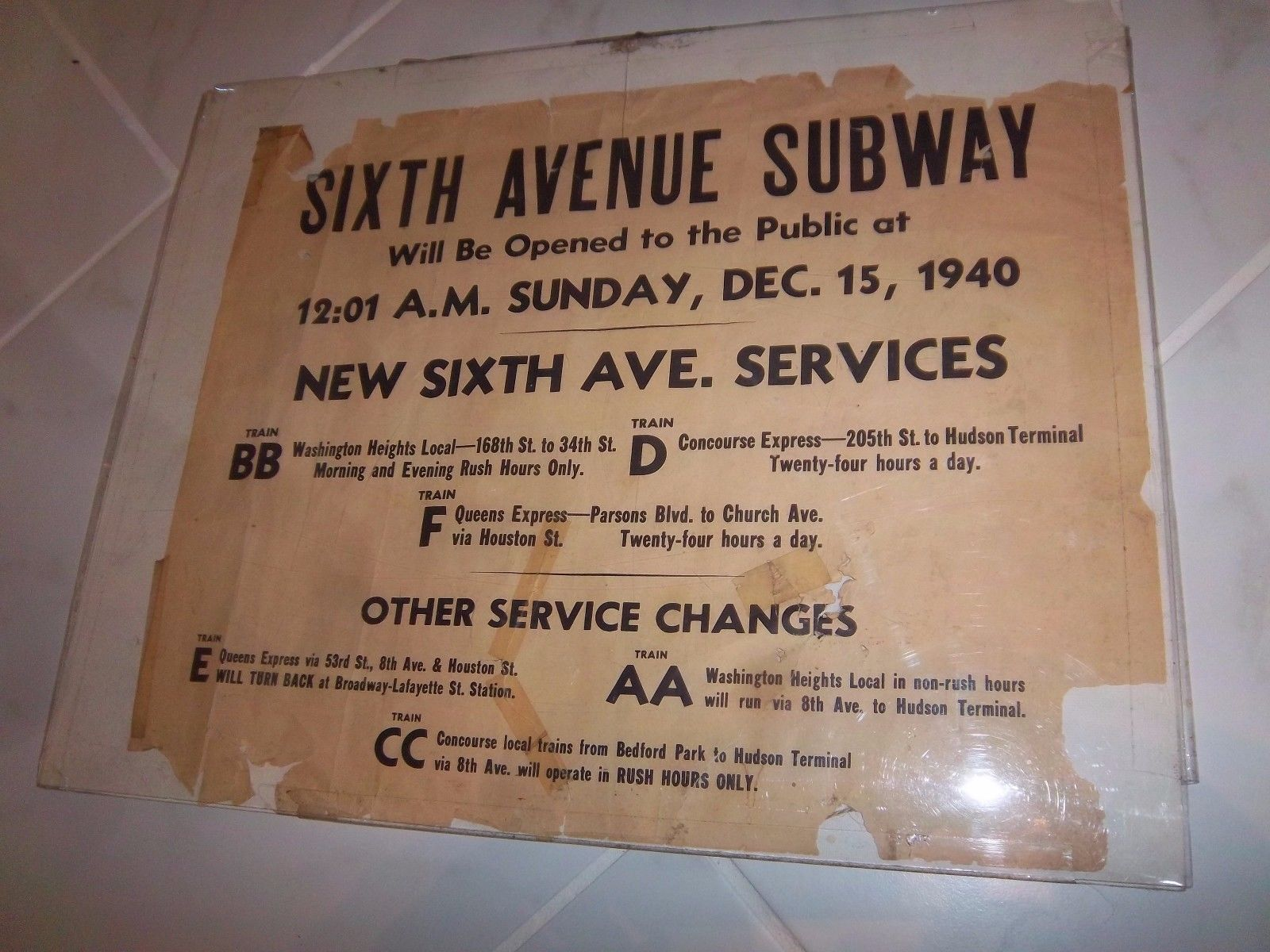
Sixth Avenue Subway Will Be Opened to the Public at 12:01 A.M. Sunday, Dec 15, 1940

=== Early history ===
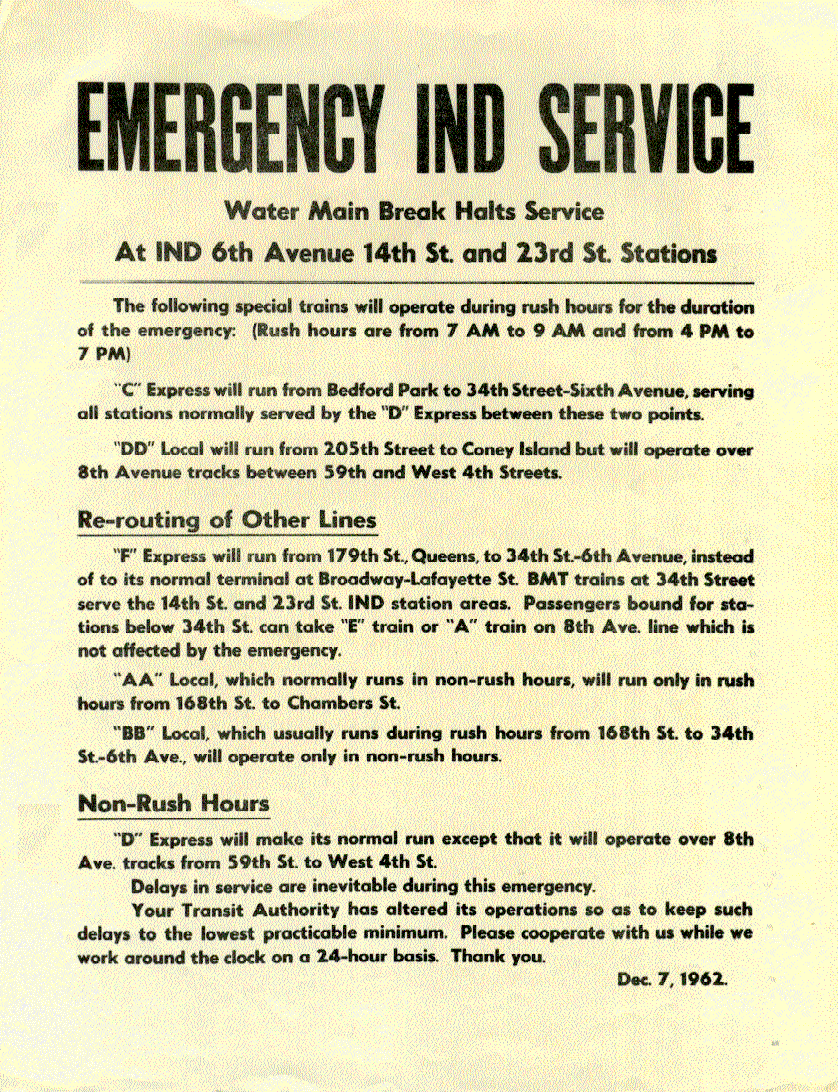
A poster showing the temporary DD service that resulted from a water main break

D service began on December 15, 1940, when the IND Sixth Avenue Line opened. It ran from 205th Street, the Bronx to World Trade Center (at that time called Hudson Terminal) on the IND Eighth Avenue Line at all times, switching between the IND Sixth Avenue to the Eighth Avenue Lines just south of West Fourth Street–Washington Square. Service ran express via the Concourse Line during rush hours. Two trains started service at Bedford Park Boulevard in the morning rush hour.

D service was increased on October 24, 1949, in order to offset the discontinuation of C service, which ran express via the Concourse Line and the Eighth Avenue Line. After the morning rush hour on weekdays, several D trains terminated at Bedford Park Boulevard. On December 29, 1951, Saturday peak direction express service in the Bronx was discontinued, along with the discontinuation of Saturday CC local service.

On October 30, 1954, the Culver Ramp opened, providing a connection between the IND South Brooklyn Line and BMT Culver Line. D service was rerouted via these two lines to Coney Island–Stillwell Avenue with alternate trains running to Church Avenue during rush hours. On Saturdays, four round trips ran between 205th Street and Kings Highway. D trains replaced F service on the South Brooklyn Line, and were sent over the new connection as the first IND service to reach Coney Island. The service was announced as Concourse–Culver and advertised as direct Bronx–Coney Island service.

On May 13, 1957, alternate D trains were cut back to Church Avenue during weekday middays. Between October 7, 1957, and 1959, four rush hour trains ran to Euclid Avenue via the IND Fulton Street Line when the D started being inspected at Pitkin Yard. Four trains left 205th Street between 7:20 and 8:10 a.m., and one left Bedford Park Boulevard at 8:53 a.m. These four trains returned between 3 and 5 p.m. During the morning rush hour, several northbound trains ended at Bedford Park Boulevard. These trains ran express along the Fulton Street Line if they ran during the hour that A trains ran express along the line.

From December 4 to 27, 1962, a special service labeled DD was provided due to a water main break. It operated during rush hours only between 205th Street and Stillwell Avenue. It made all stops between 205th Street in the Bronx and 59th Street–Columbus Circle in Manhattan, rerouted via the Eighth Avenue Local between 59th and West Fourth Streets, and then made all stops between West Fourth Street in Manhattan and Stillwell Avenue in Brooklyn via the Culver Line.

=== Chrystie Street Connection (1967–1981) ===
On November 26, 1967, the Chrystie Street Connection opened, connecting the Sixth Avenue Line with the north tracks of the Manhattan Bridge and the BMT Southern Division lines in Brooklyn. In conjunction with this project, the new express tracks on the Sixth Avenue Line between West Fourth Street–Washington Square and 34th Street were opened, providing additional capacity for the extra trains on the IND via the connection. On this date, D service was switched over to BMT Brighton Line via this new connector, running express on weekdays to Brighton Beach and local to Stillwell Avenue at all other times. The D replaced Q service, which had run local in Brooklyn (except during morning rush hours and early evenings) and express on the BMT Broadway Line in Manhattan, terminating at 57th Street. In Manhattan, it ran express from West 4th Street to 34th Street rush hours only, with the B using the express tracks to relay when it terminated at West 4th Street at other times. Service on the Culver Line to Coney Island was replaced by extended F service. On July 1, 1968, it would become the full-time Sixth Avenue Express when non-rush hours B service and new KK service was extended to the new 57th Street–Sixth Avenue station.

On August 19, 1968, to reduce conflicts at the Brighton Beach terminal, D service was truncated to Brighton Beach when it ran express on the BMT Brighton Line (morning rush hours through early evenings, and QB (rush-hour peak direction only) and QJ (morning rush hours through early evenings) were extended from Brighton Beach to Coney Island–Stillwell Avenue. In addition, the span of Manhattan-bound D express service was increased by two hours, with the last express leaving Brighton Beach at 7:37 p.m.

Effective January 2, 1973, the daytime QJ was truncated to Broad Street as the J, and the M was extended beyond Broad Street during the day along the QJ's former route to Coney Island–Stillwell Avenue, via the Montague Street Tunnel and Brighton Line local tracks. Also, changes were made to D and M service on the Brighton Line. Northbound weekday M train service originating at Kings Highway would begin at 5:46 a.m., while northbound service from Coney Island would begin at 6:34 a.m. From 5:40 to 6:34 a.m. northbound D trains would run local from Brighton Beach to Kings Highway, and then run express to Prospect Park. Late morning and early afternoon D trains would from then on run express from Brighton Beach to Kings Highway. The span of D express service to Brighton Beach was extended by 45 minutes to 9:05 p.m. from Prospect Park, and the span of M service from Broad Street to Coney Island was extended by 45 minutes over the span of QJ service to cover local stops.

=== Manhattan Bridge reconstruction and Brighton Line rehabilitation work (1982–2004) ===
For brief periods between 1982 and 1985, the Manhattan Bridge north tracks were out of service due to repairs, preventing D trains from operating along its normal route. In some instances, D trains were rerouted between Broadway–Lafayette Street and DeKalb Avenue via the Nassau Street Line and the Montague Street Tunnel. In the northbound direction, D trains would operate via the Fourth Avenue Line from DeKalb Avenue to Court Street, via the Montague Street Tunnel, and then via the Nassau Street Line to Essex Street; at Essex Street, trains would change direction and utilize the Williamsburg Bridge connection of the Chrystie Street Connection and return to its normal route at Broadway–Lafayette Street. In the southbound direction, D trains would utilize the Williamsburg Bridge connection of the Chrystie Street Connection to Essex Street; at Essex Street, trains would change direction and operate via the Nassau Street Line, the Montague Street Tunnel, and the Fourth Avenue Line to DeKalb Avenue and return to its normal route. This reroute proved unsatisfactory because it delayed J and M trains.

D service was divided and ran in two sections when the north tracks of the Manhattan Bridge closed on April 26, 1986, due to construction, with regular service expected to resume on October 26, 1986. The northern section ran between Norwood–205th Street in the Bronx and 34th Street–Herald Square (the orange D) while the southern section ran express on the BMT Broadway Line from 57th Street–Seventh Avenue to Canal Street, then crossed the south tracks of the Manhattan Bridge into Brooklyn, and operated local along the Brighton Line to Stillwell Avenue (the yellow D). Service to Grand Street was replaced by the S shuttle, which ran via the Sixth Avenue local to 57th Street–Sixth Avenue.

At this time, the local tracks on the BMT Brighton Line also underwent reconstruction, necessitating the suspension of express service. As a substitute, the D and Q ran skip-stop service between Newkirk Avenue and Sheepshead Bay on weekdays. D trains served Neck Road, Avenue M, and Avenue H; the Q served Avenue U and Avenue J, and both trains served Kings Highway. The first skip-stop train left Brighton Beach at about 6:30 a.m. while the last one left 57th Street–Seventh Avenue at about 7:30 p.m. On weekday evenings, between 8 p.m. and 1 a.m., D trains made all local stops, except Parkside Avenue and Beverley Road where service was only available in one direction. During late nights and weekends, D trains ran express between Prospect Park and Kings Highway depending on which tracks were being worked on. By 1987, as reconstruction on the Brighton Line progressed, the weekday skip-stop pattern expanded to Prospect Park, with D trains serving Beverley Road while Q trains served Cortelyou Road and Parkside Avenue, with Church Avenue as a mutual station. From November 23, 1987, to May 13, 1988, one AM rush hour D train was extended beyond its normal terminal at 57th Street/Seventh Avenue and terminated at Astoria – Ditmars Boulevard.

On December 11, 1988, the north tracks of the Manhattan Bridge reopened and the two sections of the D joined running via Sixth Avenue Express. The D now ran as the full-time Brighton Local to Stillwell Avenue.

In January 1991, a reduction of service along the Concourse and Central Park West Corridors was proposed. Peak direction D service between Fordham Road and 145th Street would be discontinued. In addition, the D would be the sole service along the Concourse Line due to the elimination (later changed to a reroute) of C service. This service change would have been implemented in October 1991, pending approval from the MTA board.

From April 30 to November 12, 1995, the Bridge's north tracks closed during middays and weekends and during these hours, D service was cut south of 34th Street-Herald Square. In its place, the Q ran local in Brooklyn to Stillwell Avenue. On July 22, 2001, the north tracks were closed at all times and the southern (Broadway Line) tracks reopened. D service was again cut below 34th Street–Herald Square. In Brooklyn, D service was replaced by Q local service.

=== 2004–present ===
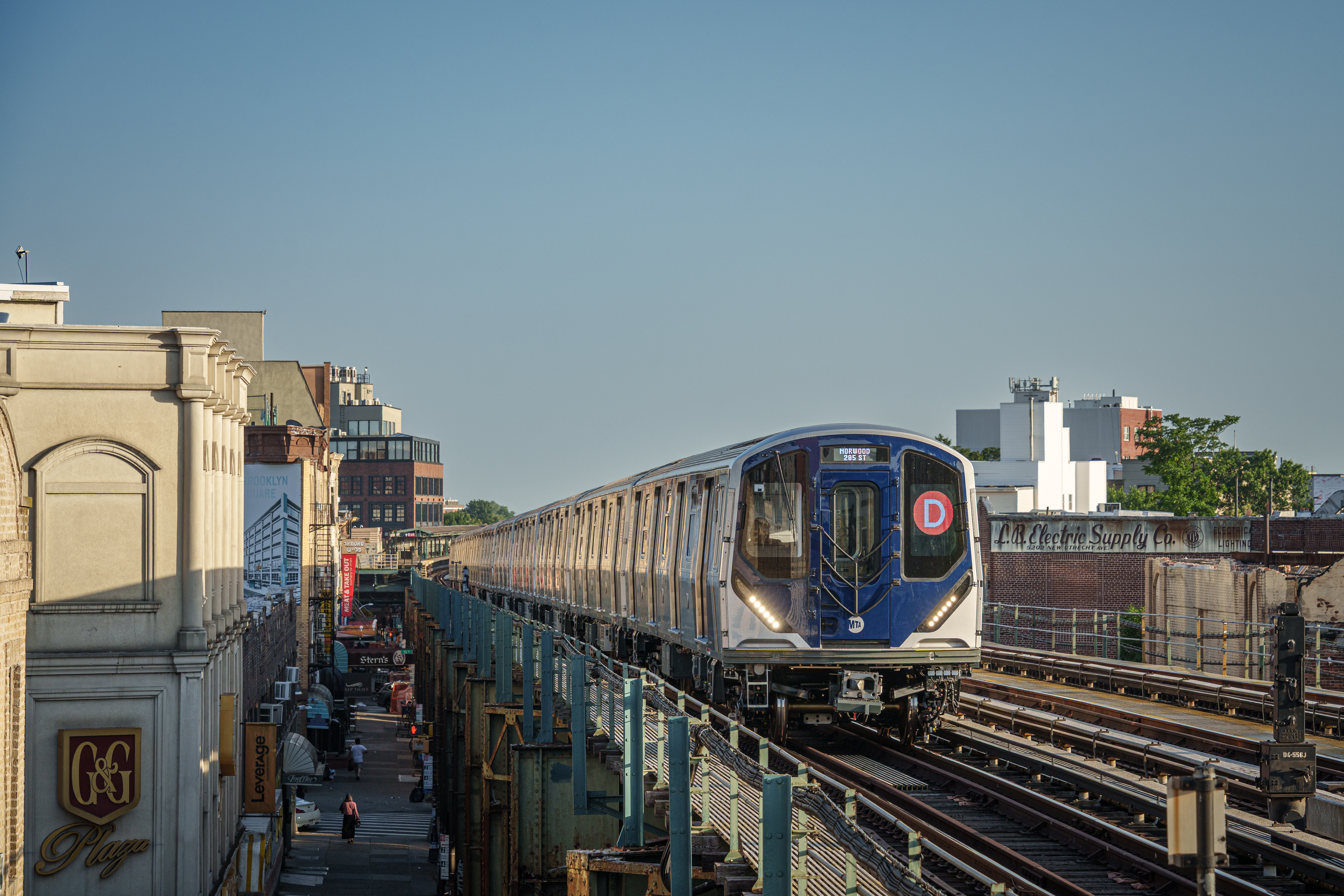
A Manhattan-bound D train of R211As entering 50th Street.

On February 22, 2004, full service on the Manhattan Bridge was restored and D trains were extended via the north tracks of the bridge to Brooklyn, replacing the W as the Fourth Avenue Express (late nights local) and West End Local to Coney Island–Stillwell Avenue. The D was moved to the West End Line instead of returning to the Brighton Line, which it had run on since 1967, to provide 24-hour service to both the Concourse Line and West End Line and avoid running two separate (B and D) shortened services outside of weekdays. This eliminated the need to run late-night and weekend shuttles on the West End Line as was done prior to 2002.

From May 24, 2004, to fall 2004, signal modernization on the IND Concourse Line required the suspension of D express service in the Bronx.

From September 18, 2021, until January 24, 2022, southbound D trains terminated at Bay 50th Street so work could be completed to protect Coney Island Yard from flooding.

The IND Concourse Line's express track was closed from July 2, 2022, to January 23, 2023, with D trains using the local tracks at all times. Effective December 15, 2024, four a.m. rush hour trains began entering service at 25th Avenue and four evening trains began terminating at Bay Parkway, instead of starting or ending at Coney Island–Stillwell Avenue.

== Route ==
=== Signage history ===
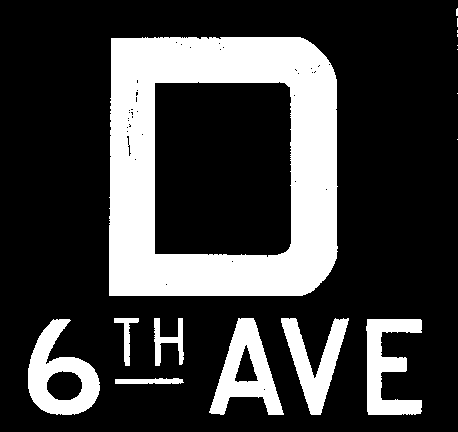
Pre-1967 bullet used on the R1s to R38s

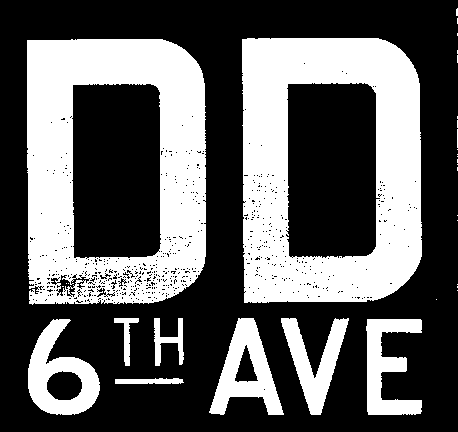
1962 DD bullet

1967–1979 bullet

1986-1988 bullet for the BMT Broadway Line

Diamond bullet for peak direction Concourse express service, used on maps until the mid-2000s

The current bullet used since 1979

=== Service pattern ===
The following table shows the lines used by the D, with shaded boxes indicating the route at the specified times:

Line	From	To	Tracks	Times		
Line	From	To	Tracks	non- rush	rush peak	late nights
IND Concourse Line (full line)	Norwood–205th Street		all			
IND Concourse Line (full line)	Bedford Park Boulevard	145th Street	express			
IND Concourse Line (full line)	Bedford Park Boulevard	145th Street	local			
IND Eighth Avenue Line	135th Street	59th Street–Columbus Circle	express			
IND Sixth Avenue Line	Seventh Avenue/53rd Street	Broadway–Lafayette Street	express			
Chrystie Street Connection	Grand Street		all			
Manhattan Bridge			north			
BMT Fourth Avenue Line	DeKalb Avenue		bypass			
BMT Fourth Avenue Line	DeKalb Avenue		bridge			
BMT Fourth Avenue Line	Atlantic Avenue–Barclays Center	36th Street	express			
BMT Fourth Avenue Line	Atlantic Avenue–Barclays Center	36th Street	local			
BMT West End Line (full line)	Ninth Avenue	Coney Island–Stillwell Avenue	local			

=== Stations ===
For a more detailed station listing, see the articles on the lines listed above.

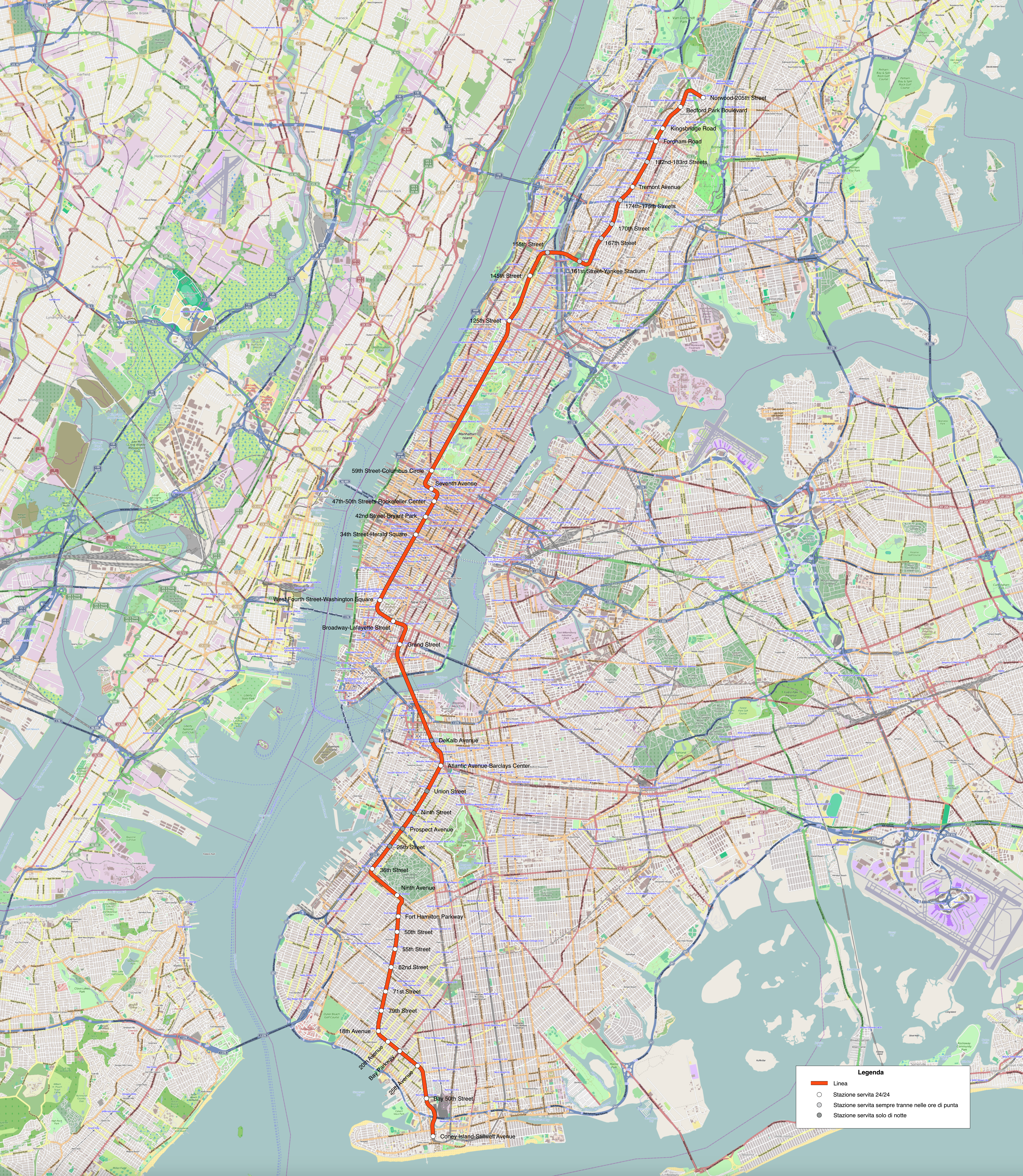
To scale line map

Station service legend
Stops all times	Stops 24 hours a day
Stops all times except late nights	Stops every day during daytime hours only
Stops late nights only	Stops every day during overnight hours only
Stops weekdays during the day	Stops during weekday daytime hours only
Stops all times except rush hours in the peak direction	Stops 24 hours a day, except during weekday rush hours in the peak direction
Stops rush hours only	Stops during weekday rush hours only
Station closed	Station closed
Stops rush hours in the peak direction only	Stops weekdays in the peak direction only
Time period details
Disabled access	Station is compliant with the Americans with Disabilities Act
↑	Station is compliant with the Americans with Disabilities Act in the indicated direction only
↓	Station is compliant with the Americans with Disabilities Act in the indicated direction only
	Elevator access to mezzanine only

D service	Stations	Disabled access	Subway transfers	Connections and notes
The Bronx
Concourse Line
Stops all times	Norwood–205th Street			
Stops all times	Bedford Park Boulevard	Disabled access	B	Some a.m. rush hour trips to and from Brooklyn begin or end their runs at this station (Note: Some northbound trains terminate at this station during a.m. rush hours; some southbound trains originate at this station during a.m. rush hours.)
Stops all times	Kingsbridge Road	Disabled access	B	
Stops all times	Fordham Road		B	Bx12 Select Bus Service
Stops all times except rush hours in the peak direction	182nd–183rd Streets		B	
Stops all times	Tremont Avenue	Disabled access	B	
Stops all times except rush hours in the peak direction	174th–175th Streets		B	
Stops all times except rush hours in the peak direction	170th Street		B	
Stops all times except rush hours in the peak direction	167th Street		B	
Stops all times except rush hours in the peak direction	161st Street–Yankee Stadium	Disabled access	B 4 (IRT Jerome Avenue Line)	Bx6 Select Bus Service; Metro-North Hudson Line at Yankees–East 153rd Street; Express trains that normally bypass this station will stop when an event is being held at Yankee Stadium
Manhattan
Stops all times except rush hours in the peak direction	155th Street		B	
Stops all times	145th Street		B A C (IND Eighth Avenue Line)	
Eighth Avenue Line
Stops all times	125th Street	Disabled access	A B C	M60 Select Bus Service to LaGuardia Airport
Stops all times	59th Street–Columbus Circle	Disabled access	A B C 1 2 (IRT Broadway–Seventh Avenue Line)	
Sixth Avenue Line
Stops all times	Seventh Avenue/53rd Street		B E (IND Queens Boulevard Line)	
Stops all times	47th–50th Streets–Rockefeller Center	Disabled access	B F <F> M	
Stops all times	42nd Street–Bryant Park	Elevator access to mezzanine only	B F <F> M 7 <7> (IRT Flushing Line at Fifth Avenue); 1 2 3 (IRT Broadway–Seventh Avenue Line at Times Square–42nd Street, daytime only); N Q R W (BMT Broadway Line at Times Square–42nd Street, daytime only); S (42nd Street Shuttle at Times Square, daytime only); A C E (IND Eighth Avenue Line at 42nd Street–Port Authority Bus Terminal, daytime only)	
Stops all times	34th Street–Herald Square	Disabled access	B F <F> M N Q R W (BMT Broadway Line)	M34 / M34A Select Bus Service; PATH at 33rd Street; Amtrak, LIRR, NJ Transit at Pennsylvania Station
Stops all times	West Fourth Street–Washington Square	Disabled access	B F <F> M A C E (IND Eighth Avenue Line)	PATH at Ninth Street
Stops all times	Broadway–Lafayette Street	Disabled access	B F <F> M 4 6 <6> (IRT Lexington Avenue Line at Bleecker Street)	
Chrystie Street Branch
Stops all times	Grand Street		B	
Brooklyn
Fourth Avenue Line
Stops late nights only	DeKalb Avenue	Disabled access	N Q R	
Stops all times	Atlantic Avenue–Barclays Center	Disabled access	N R W B Q (BMT Brighton Line); 2 3 4 5 (IRT Eastern Parkway Line)	LIRR Atlantic Branch at Atlantic Terminal
Stops late nights only	Union Street		N R	
Stops late nights only	Ninth Street		N R F G (IND Culver Line at Fourth Avenue)	
Stops late nights only	Prospect Avenue		N R	
Stops late nights only	25th Street		N R	
Stops all times	36th Street		N R W	
West End Line
Stops all times	Ninth Avenue		R W	
Stops all times	Fort Hamilton Parkway			
Stops all times	50th Street			
Stops all times	55th Street			
Stops all times	62nd Street	Disabled access	R W N W (BMT Sea Beach Line at New Utrecht Avenue)	
Stops all times	71st Street			
Stops all times	79th Street			
Stops all times	18th Avenue			
Stops all times	20th Avenue			
Stops all times	Bay Parkway	Disabled access	R W	B82 Select Bus Service; Southern terminal for some southbound evening trains (Note: Some southbound D trains terminate at this station during the evening)
Stops all times	25th Avenue			Southern terminal for some northbound a.m. rush hour trains (Note: Some northbound D trains originate at this station during the a.m. rush hour)
Stops all times	Bay 50th Street			
Stops all times	Coney Island–Stillwell Avenue	Disabled access	F <F> (IND Culver Line); N (BMT Sea Beach Line); Q (BMT Brighton Line)	
