= Stillwell Avenue =

Avenue in Brooklyn, New York

- Interactive map of Stillwell Avenue
- Length: 2.4 mi (3.9 km)
- Location: Brooklyn
- South end: Dead end at Riegelmann Boardwalk in Coney Island
- North end: Bay Parkway (becomes Bay Ridge Parkway - former NY 439)

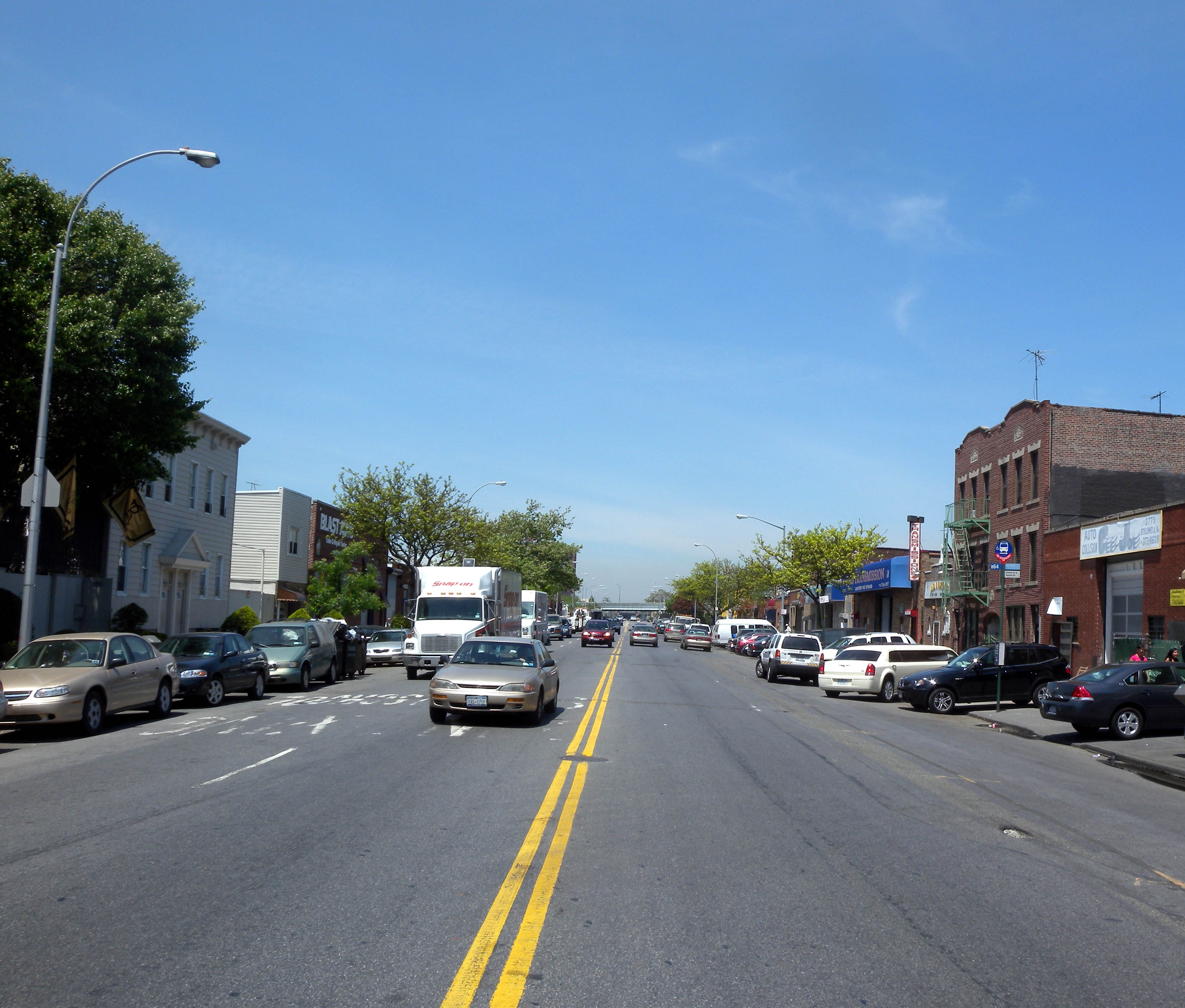
At Neptune Avenue

Stillwell Avenue is a major two-way north–south thoroughfare in southern Brooklyn and the central section of Coney Island. It is 2.4 miles (3.9 km) long and begins at a dead end at Riegelmann Boardwalk on Coney Island. The road goes north, leaving Coney Island, ending at Bay Parkway, where the road continues as the Bay Ridge Parkway (former Route 439). On December 11, 2008, it acquired the subsidiary name Polar Bear Club Walk, named for the Coney Island Polar Bear Club. The Stillwell Avenue/Surf Avenue intersection on Coney Island is the location of the Coney Island–Stillwell Avenue subway station, a major subway station in New York City.

== History ==
Stillwell Avenue was named after settler Nicholas Stillwell (1603–1671), who had a farm in the area and became the progenitor of an influential Brooklyn family by the same name.

Plans for Stillwell Avenue began in October 1926. The street was to stretch from Bay Parkway (its current northern terminus) and Neptune Avenue on Coney Island (0.4 miles (0.64 km) from the southern terminus). The project was to cost $331,500 and was certified by Brooklyn borough president James J. Byrne. Stillwell Avenue, at the intersection with Surf Avenue, is the location of the original Nathan's.

The New York Sun newspaper released a story in 2006 about plans to reinvigorate Coney Island. Most of it was for amusement parks, as well as a large waterpark and a three-story carousel. A scaled down version of this plan would later become Luna Park. In 2016, plans were released for the redevelopment of the Shore Theater at the intersection with Surf Avenue.

In 2016, the corner of Surf Avenue and Stillwell Avenue was co-named Nathan & Ida Handwerker Way – to honor Nathan and his wife Ida the co-founders of Nathan's Famous.

== Street description ==
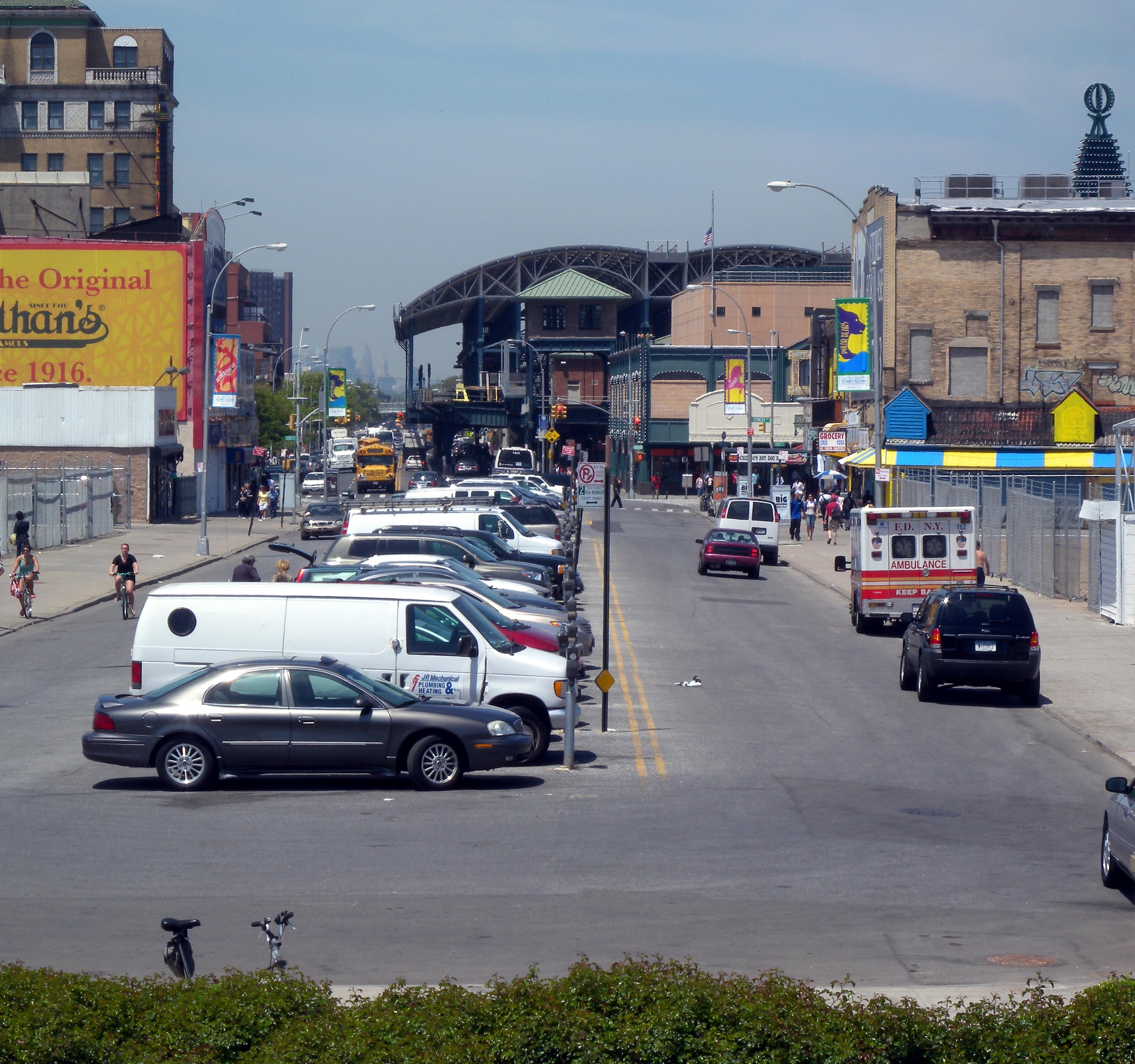
South end

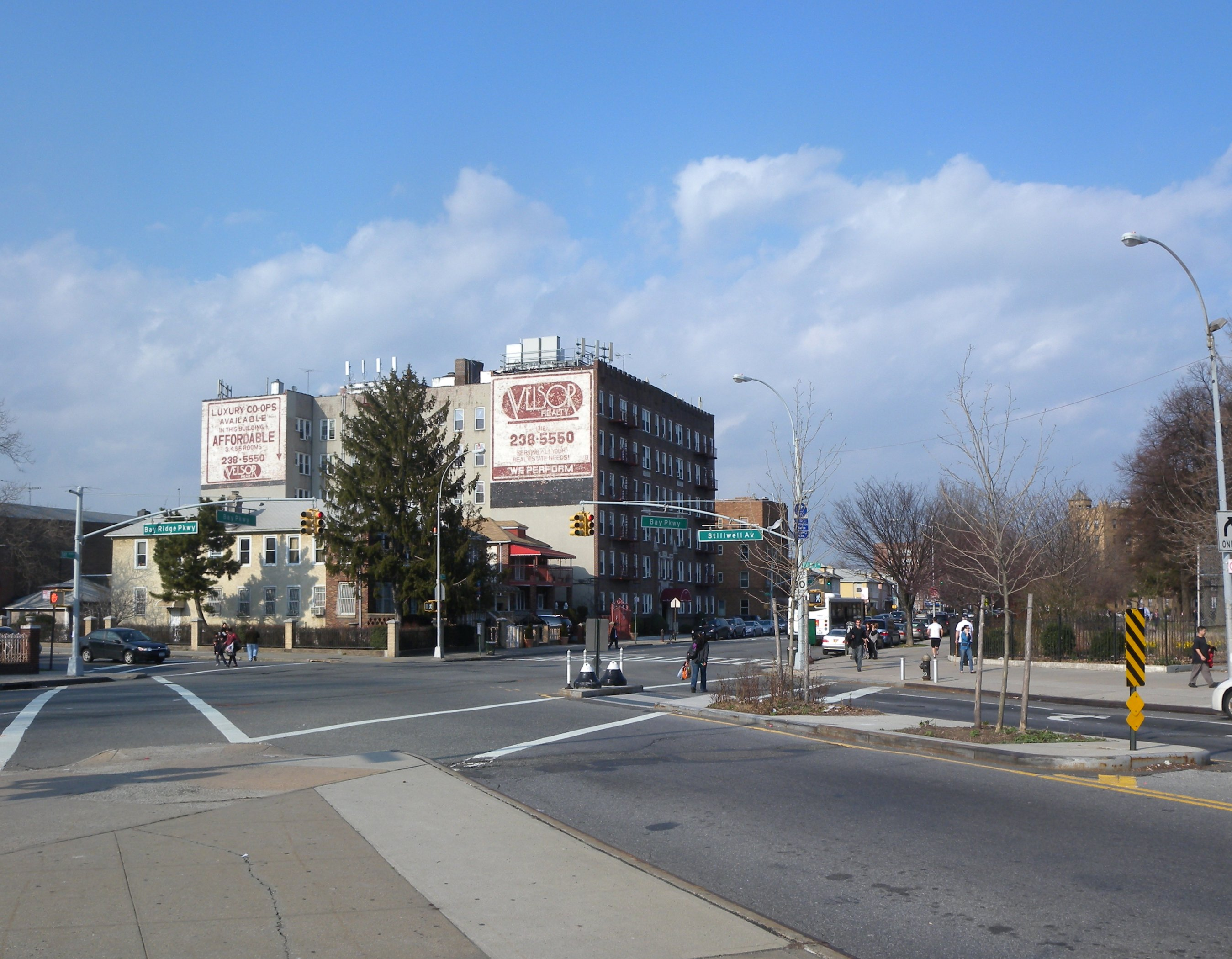
North end

Stillwell Avenue begins at the Atlantic Ocean on Coney Island, just north of the Riegelmann Boardwalk, occupying the position of West 14th Street. The road parallels Henderson Walk for a short distance to the intersection with Surf Avenue at 0.2 mile. Surf Avenue stretches parallel to the boardwalk on Coney Island. Neptune Avenue is the next intersection, intersecting at 0.4 mile. Soon afterwards, Stillwell Avenue crosses Coney Island Creek, which reaches into Lower New York Bay. Just after crossing the creek, Stillwell Avenue goes under the Shore Parkway, a section of the Belt Parkway system. Although it does not have an interchange with the road, Exit 6N on the westbound Shore Parkway is for Stillwell Avenue. Instead, the exit lets off at Avenue Z and accesses Stillwell within a mile. Bay 50th Street intersects just afterwards 1-mile (1.6 km). Stillwell Avenue then passes Scarangella Park and intersects 86th Street at 1.6 miles (2.6 km). At 2.3 miles (3.7 km), there is an intersection with Kings Highway, which ends soon afterwards at Bay Parkway. Stillwell Avenue also comes to an end at Bay Parkway, 2.4 miles (3.9 km) from its start. The road virtually continues as Bay Ridge Parkway, a street that was formerly part of Route 439.

=== Major intersections ===
The entire route is in the New York City borough of Brooklyn.

Location	mi	km	Destinations	Notes
Coney Island	0.2	0.32	Surf Avenue	
Gravesend	0.8	1.3	Avenue Z to Shore Parkway	
Gravesend	1.1	1.8	Bay 50th Street	
Bensonhurst	2.4	3.9	Bay Parkway	Northern terminus; continues as Bay Ridge Parkway at Bay Parkway
1.000 mi = 1.609 km; 1.000 km = 0.621 mi

== Transportation ==
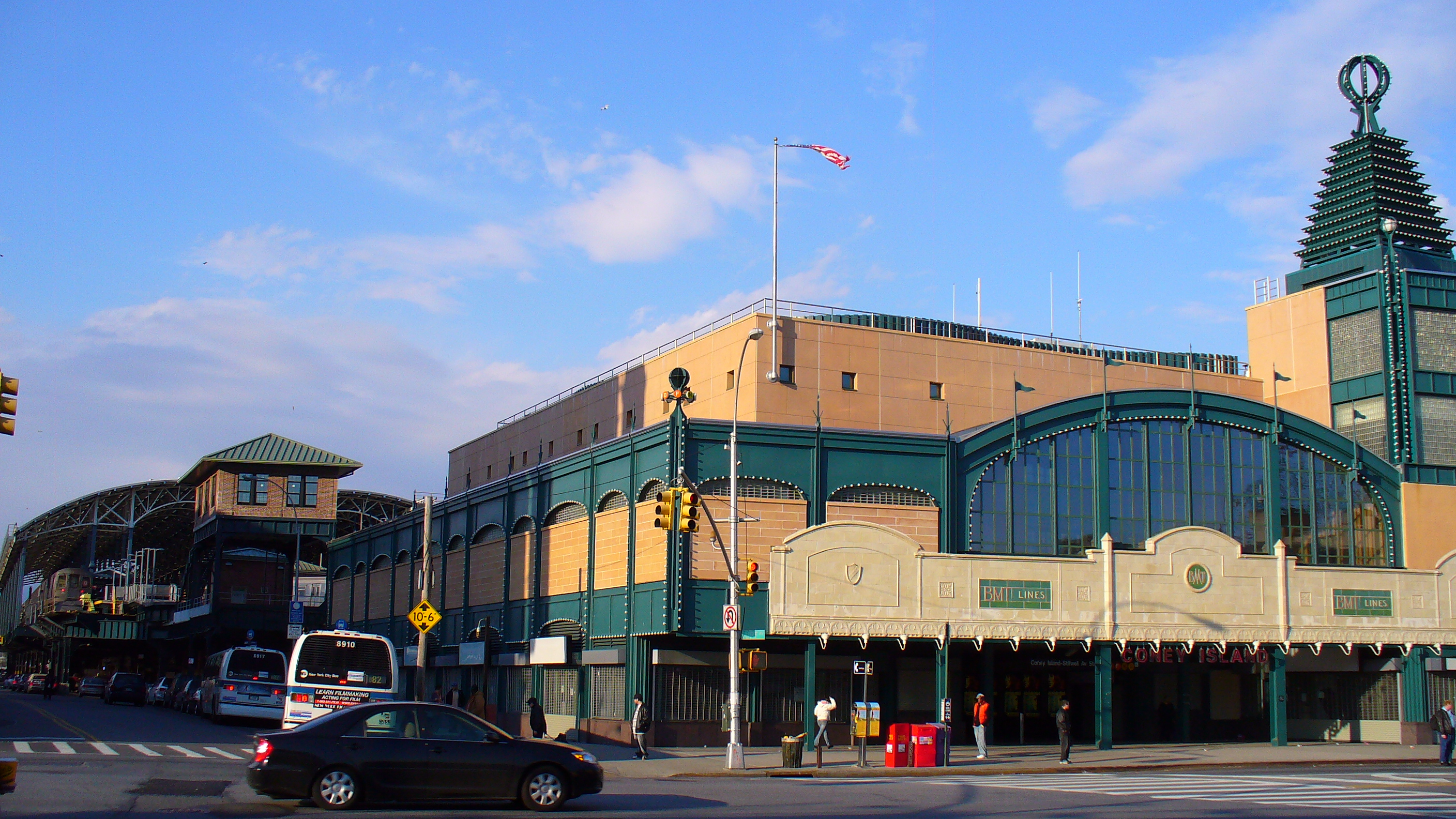
The Coney Island subway terminal

At the Surf Avenue intersection on Coney Island, the largest elevated rapid transit terminal in existence, which shares a name with the avenue, is located on Stillwell Avenue. The station is also the most energy-efficient transit facility in the world. The station, originally opened in 1919, rebuilt and re-opened in 2004 provides access to the D, F, <F>, N, and Q trains. The other station located along Stillwell Avenue is the Bay 50th Street station in southern Brooklyn. Located in front of the John Dewey High School, the station services only the D, R, and W trains.

The following New York City Bus-operated bus lines run on Stillwell Avenue:

- The B4 serves the corridor north of 86th Street.
- North of Mermaid Avenue, the B64 serves until Harway Avenue, and the B68 and Spring Creek-bound B82 local serve until Neptune Avenue.
- The B3 runs between 86th Street and either 25th Avenue (Bensonhurst) or 84th Street (Bergen Beach).

== See also ==
- Streets in Brooklyn
- Transportation to Coney Island
