= Kaiser Park =

Public park in Brooklyn, New York

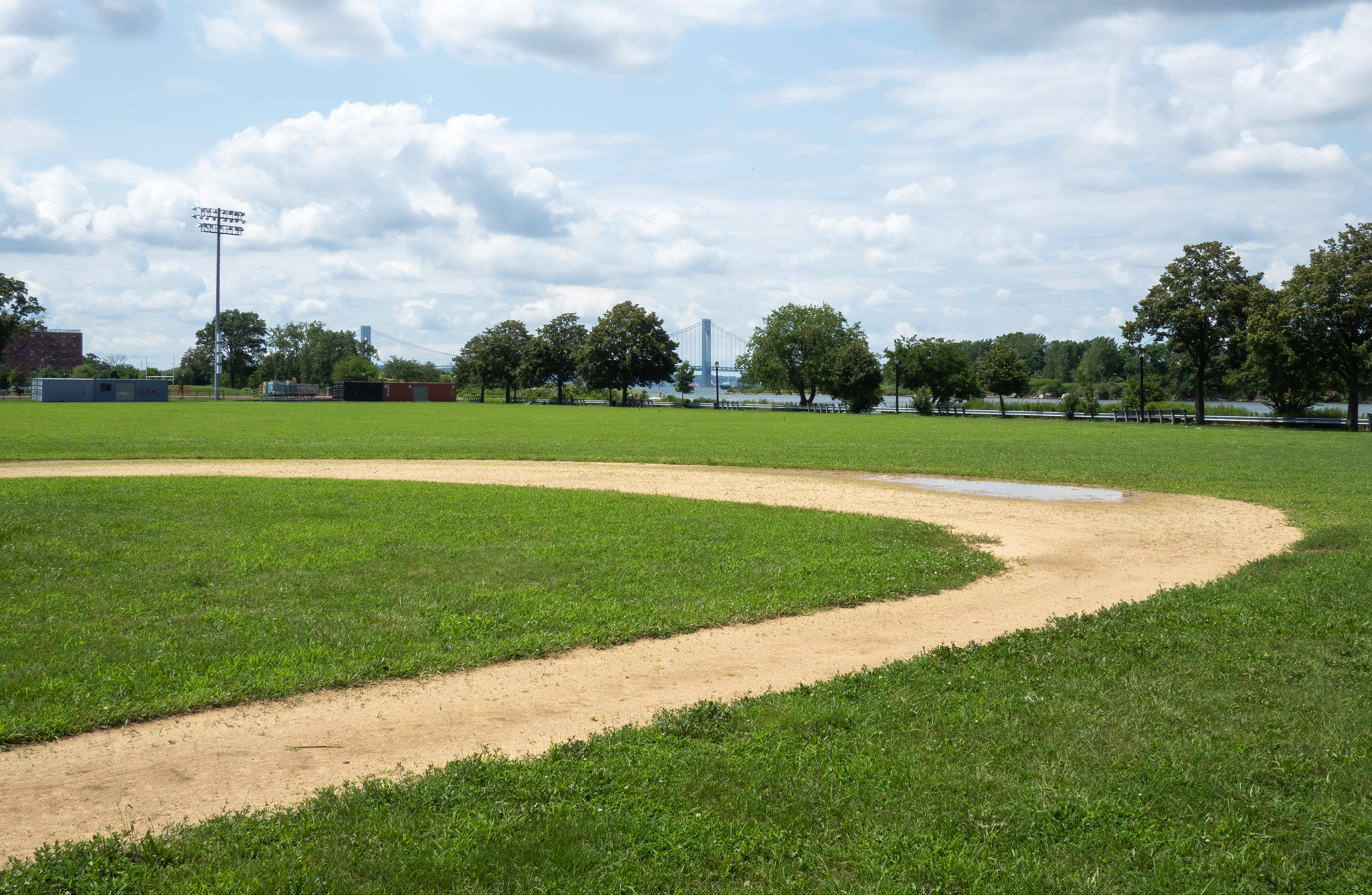
- Kaiser Park ballfield in 2021
- Interactive map of Kaiser Park
- Type: Urban park
- Location: Coney Island, Brooklyn, New York City
- Coordinates: 40°34′45″N 73°59′46″W
- Created: New York City Department of Parks and Recreation
- Established: 1937
- Open: All year
- Terrain: Concrete

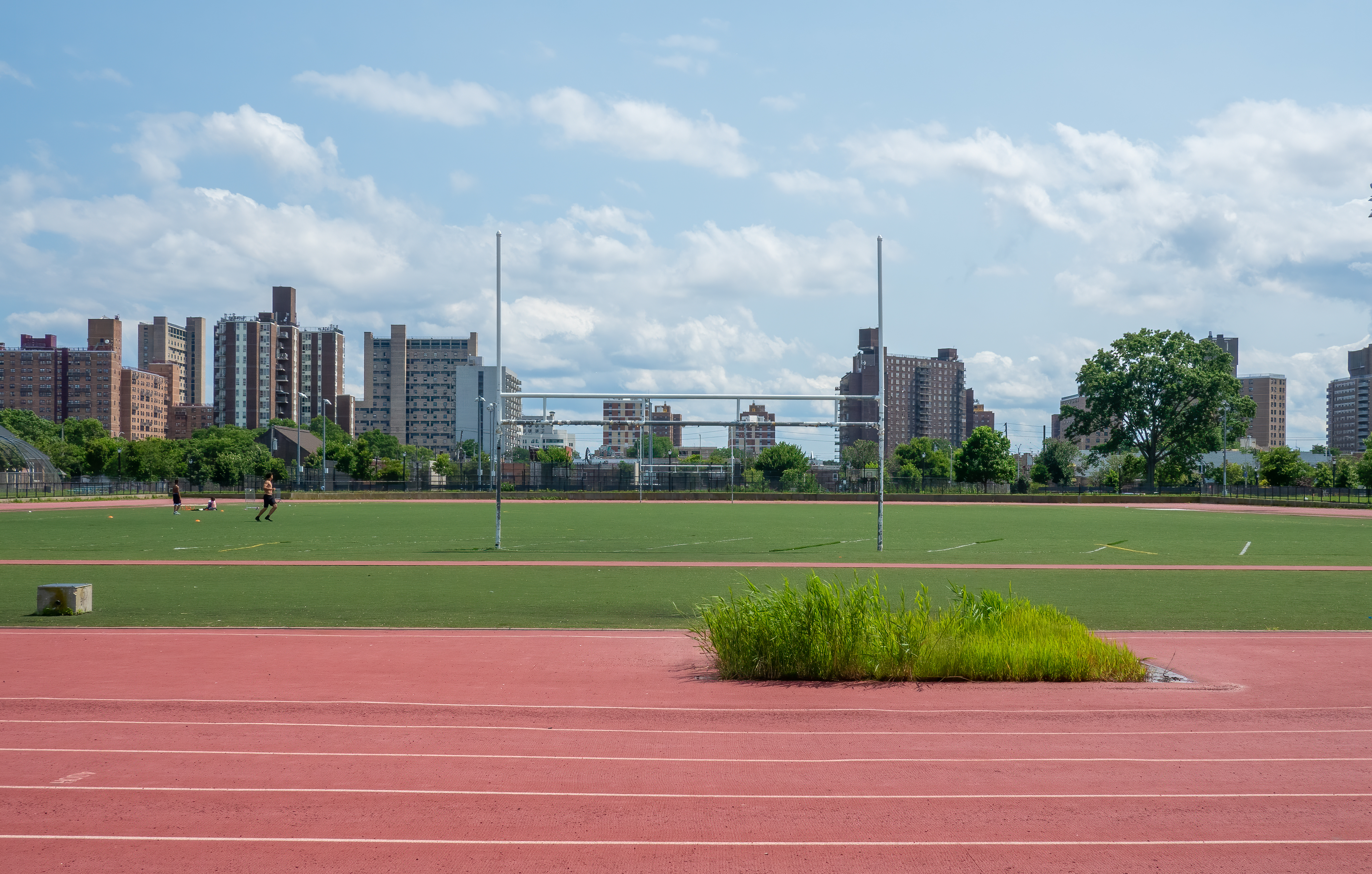
Football field and track

Kaiser Park is a public park on the northwestern coast of Coney Island in Brooklyn, New York City. It abuts Coney Island Creek, Gravesend Bay, and Coney Island Creek Park and is across Coney Island Creek from Calvert Vaux Park and Six Diamonds Park.

== History ==
The land on which Kaiser Park is located was acquired by New York City Parks Department in 1934 and 1937.

Kaiser park is named after Dr. Leon S. Kaiser (1884–1951), a New York City educationalist. In 1924, Kaiser became the principal of Public School 188. In 1937, Kaiser became principal of Mark Twain Junior High School (P.S. 239), which is located just inside what is now known as Kaiser Park. When Kaiser died in 1951, he was working as a principal at Mark Twain Junior High School. That same year, the park was named in his honor.

In 1988, the tennis courts were rebuilt. The park underwent extensive renovations after a large winter storm in 1993 damaged the park. An effort in March 1994 moved tons of displaced sand back to the shoreline.

Kaiser Park features notable bird migration watching. Bird watchers have witnessed a large variety of bird species migrating through Kaiser Park.

The park is across the street from FDNY Engine 318.

=== Ferry terminal ===
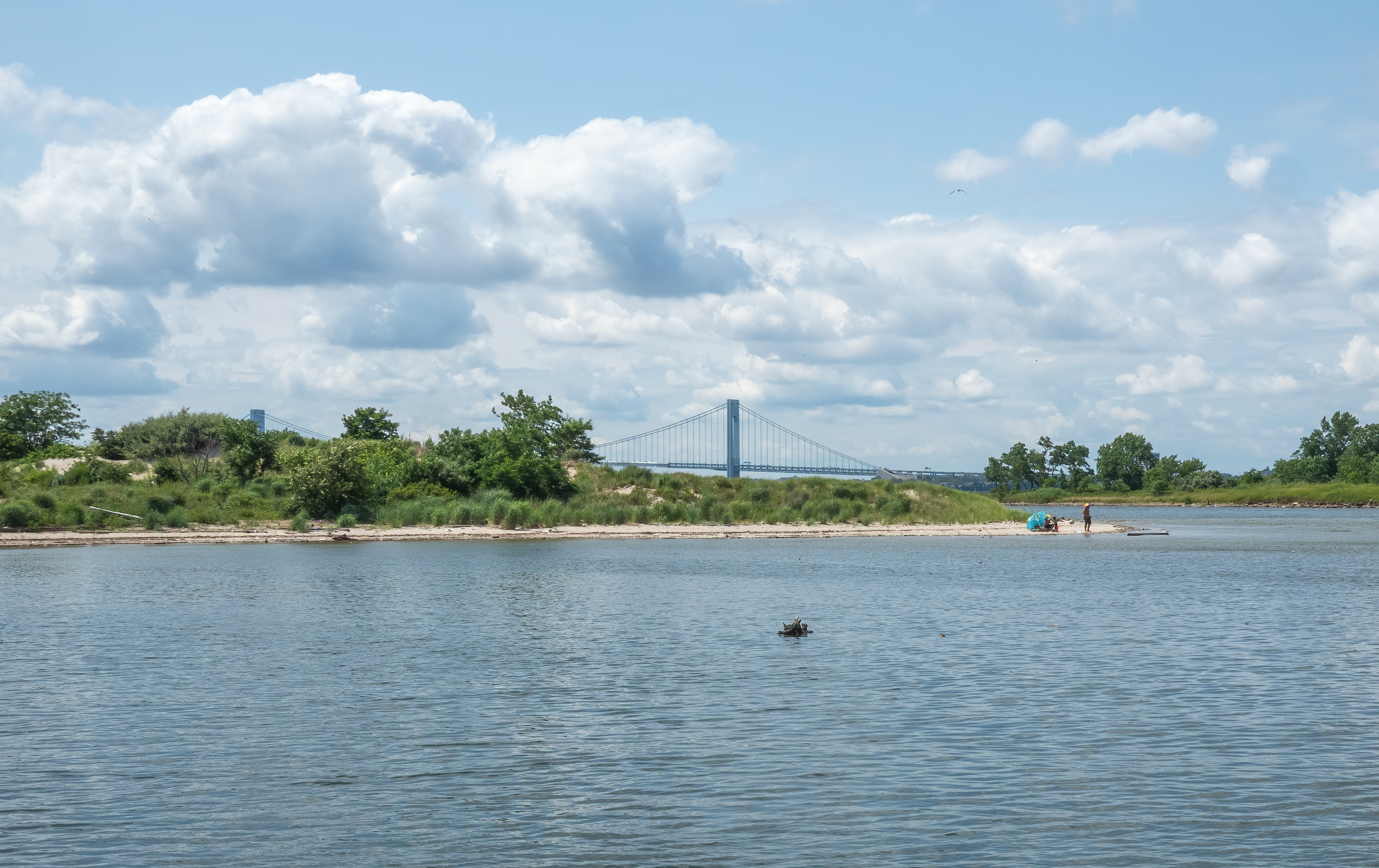
Coney Island Creek

In 2020, the city planned to build a NYC Ferry dock along the creek off Kaiser Park. The ferry dock would be the terminal of a new route to Pier 11/Wall Street; the route, announced in 2019, would start operating in 2021. Local activists rallied against the dock plan, arguing it would disrupt the ecosystems of the creek. There were also concerns that the addition of ferry service would worsen pollution in the creek.

=== Community stewardship ===
The local community hosts community care days to help the parks department maintain Kaiser Park. In 2018, The Making Waves Coalition came together as the Coney Island Beautification Project, Coney Island History Project, Cultural Research Divers, Explorers Programs of Coney Island, John Dewey High School, and Brooklyn Marine STEM Education Alliance combining forces to clean and advocate for Kaiser Park.
