= Coney Island Creek Park =

Public park in Brooklyn, New York

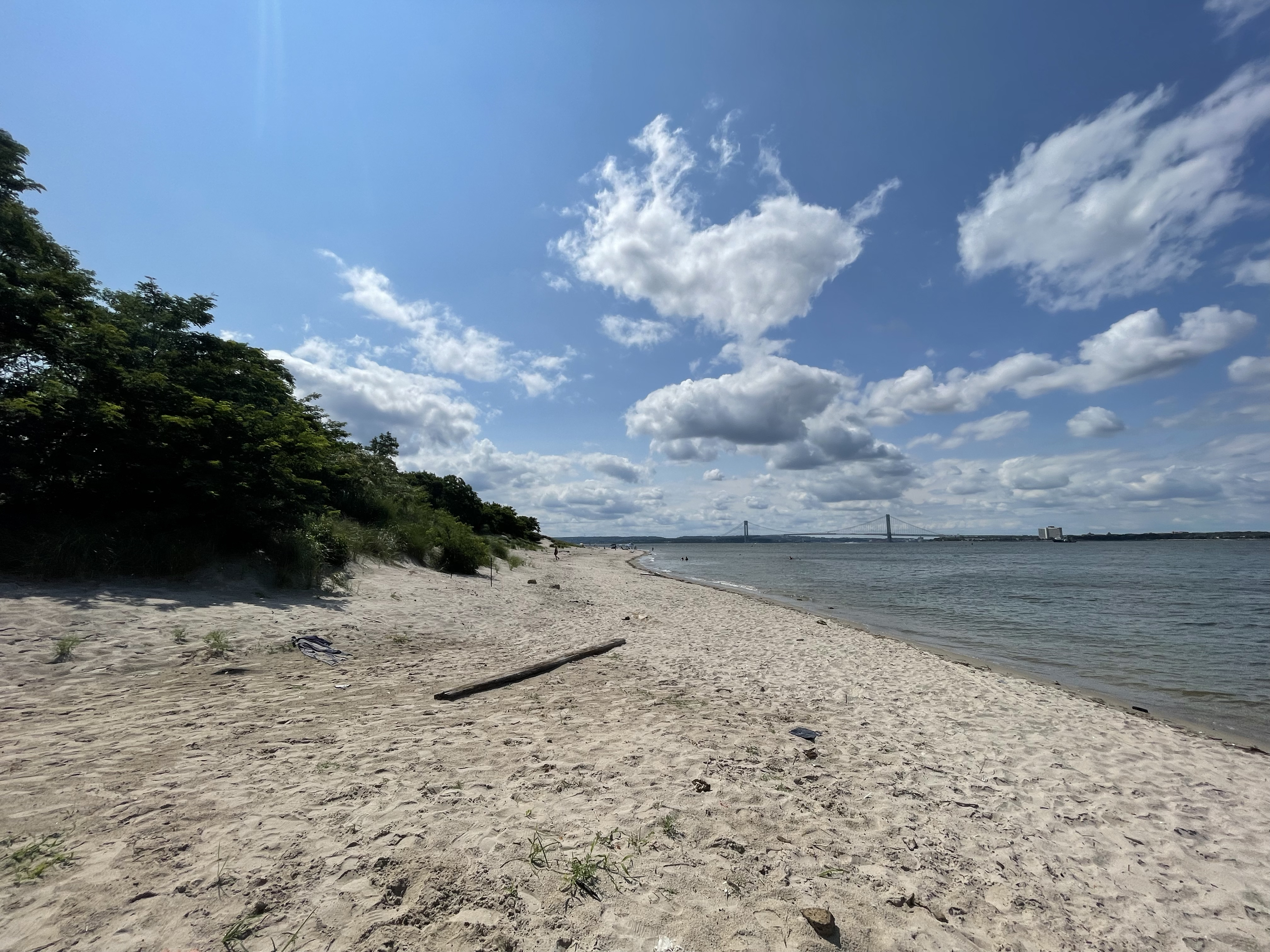
- Coney Island Creek Park beach, 2021
- Interactive map of Coney Island Creek Park
- Type: Urban park
- Location: Coney Island, Brooklyn, New York City
- Coordinates: 40°34′53″N 74°0′15″W
- Created: New York City Department of Parks and Recreation
- Open: All year
- Terrain: Concrete

Coney Island Creek Park is a public park on the northwestern coast of Coney Island in Brooklyn, New York City. It abuts Coney Island Creek, Gravesend Bay, and Kaiser Park and is across Coney Island Creek from Calvert Vaux Park and Six Diamonds Park.

== History ==
Coney Island Creek Park was designated a park under the jurisdiction of the New York City Parks and Recreation Department in 1984. The park environment consists of grasses, shrubs, and trees. Additionally, there is a small flower garden in the park. In 2001, a large sand dune was moved onto Coney Island Creek Park in order to slow erosion of the nearby Coney Island Beach. The work was completed via $1,065,000 in funding from City Council Member Howard L. Lasher.

Coney Island Creek park is a popular fishing and bird watching spot.

In 2019, a soaking wet sheep was found tied to a tree in Coney Island Creek Park.

In the late 2010s, the local community began hosting clean-ups at the park.

=== Ferry terminal ===
In 2020, the city planned to build a NYC Ferry dock along Coney Island Creek, directly passing Coney Island Creek Park, landing at the nearby Kaiser Park. The ferry dock would be the terminal of a new route to Pier 11/Wall Street; the route, announced in 2019, would start operating in 2021. Local activists rallied against the dock plan, arguing it would disrupt the ecosystems of the creek and the nearby parks. There were also concerns that the addition of ferry service would worsen pollution in the creek.

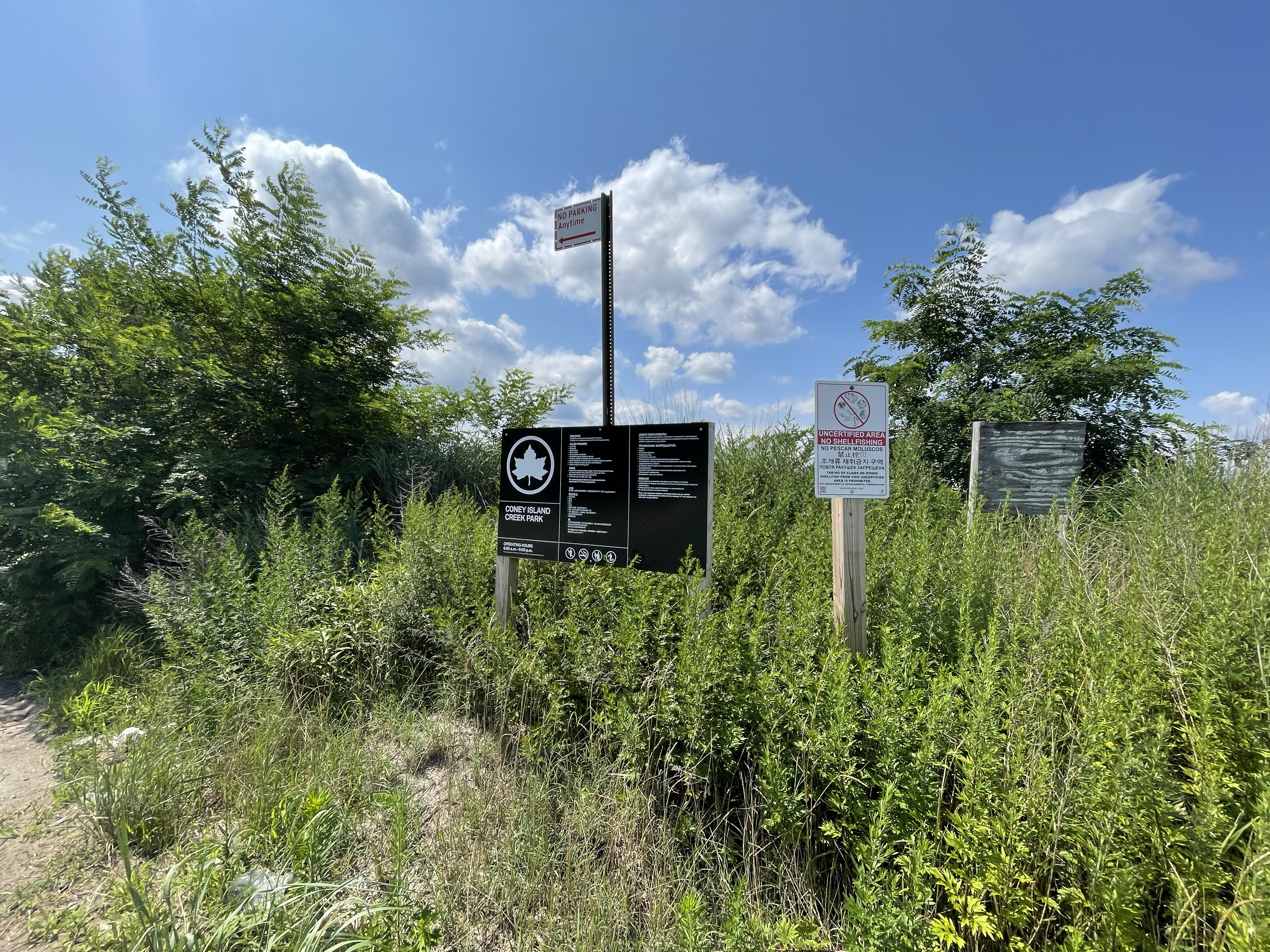
Coney Island Creek Park entrance sign off of Bayview Ave
