= Bensonhurst Park =

Public park in Brooklyn, New York

Coordinates: 40.597°N 74.001°W

A view inside of the park as of October 2023.

Bensonhurst Park is a park in Bath Beach, Brooklyn, New York City. The park stretches from the north border at Cropsey Avenue to the south border at Gravesend Bay. The park has a playground on the north-east side, a field in the middle of the playground and several basketball courts on the west side. There is also a bathroom in the northwest side of the park.

== History ==
The first calls for a park at Bath Beach began in 1891. The initial 16 acres of parkland was acquired in 1895, followed by additional purchases in 1924 and 1944.

In 2016, a $6.5 million renovation was announced for Bensonhurst Park. Renovations began in September 2019 with an expected completion date.

The renovations were completed in 2021.

== Geography ==
Bensonhurst Park's area is 0.789 square miles (2.04 km^{2}), which also includes the part south of Belt Parkway. Without the southern part, this park would be only about 14 acres (5.7 ha). Bensonhurst Park borders Cropsey Avenue to the north, Belt Parkway in the middle, Bay Parkway to the east, and 21st Avenue to the west. The park borders Gravesend Bay as well.
