= Coney Island History Project =

US nonprofit organization

The Coney Island History Project
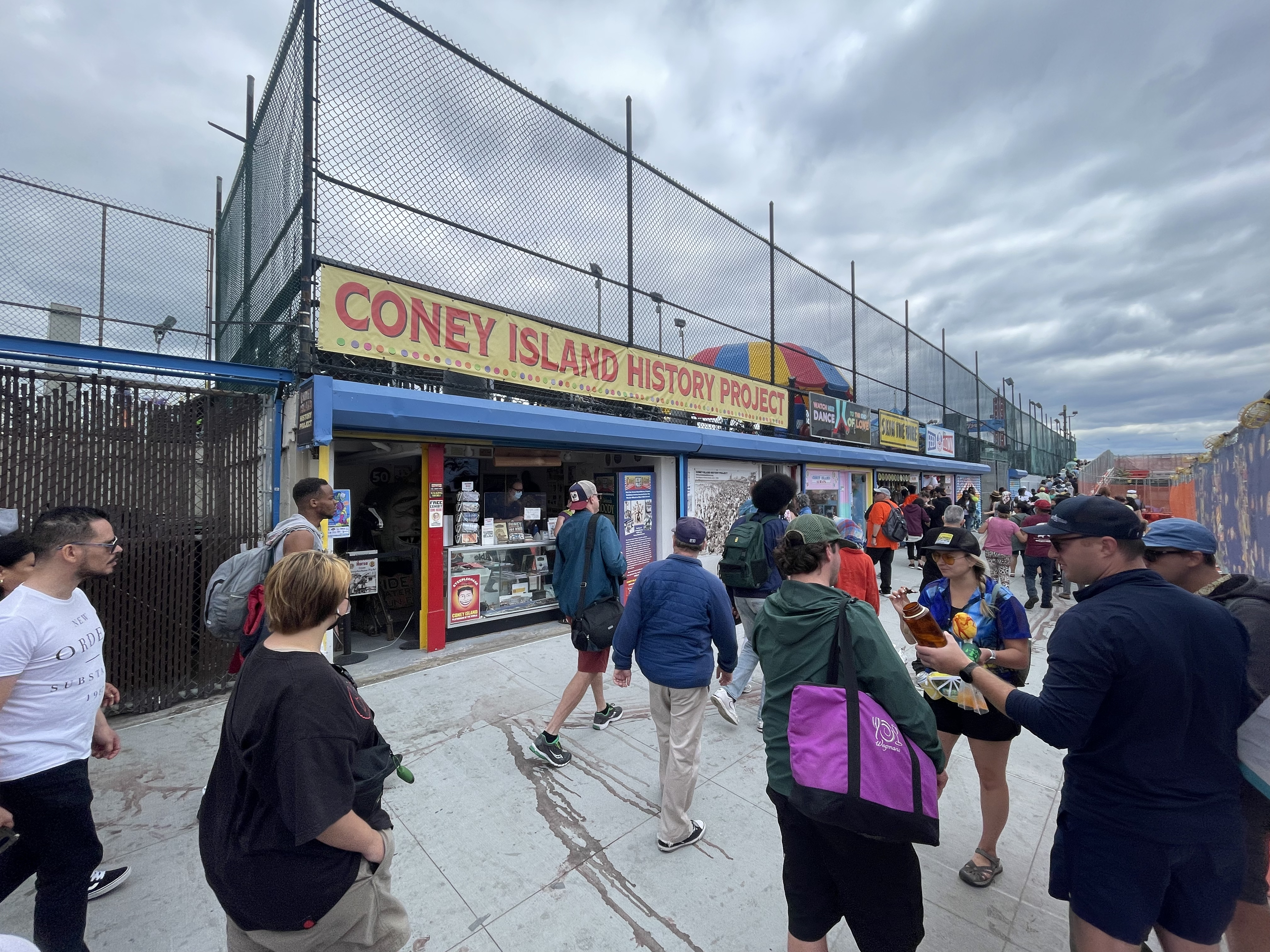
- Coney Island History Project in 2022 during the Mermaid Parade
- Interactive map showing the CIHP location
- Formation: 2004
- Founders: Carol Hill Albert, Jerome Albert
- Type: Non-profit corporation
- Headquarters: Coney Island, Brooklyn
- Coordinates: 40.57387875956967°N 73.97954802890781°W
- Director: Charles Denson
- Website: coneyislandhistory.org

The Coney Island History Project, or CIHP, founded in 2004, is a 501(c)(3) nonprofit organization that works to record and increase awareness of Coney Island's history.

== History ==
The Coney Island History Project was founded in 2004 by Carol Hill Albert and Jerome Albert in honor of Dewey Albert, creator of Astroland. Since its inception, Carol Hill and Jerome Albert tapped local historian Charles Denson as director of the Coney Island History Project. The project began as an oral history project, collecting stories of Coney Island from longtime local residents. The Coney Island History Project records, archives, and shares oral history interviews about Coney Island. The CIHP conducts interviews in English, Russian, Chinese, and Spanish. During the COVID-19 pandemic, the CIHP continued to record interviews via phone or Skype.

Over 370 interviews are available online via The Coney Island History Project Oral History Archive.

In 2025, the Coney Island History Project opposed the casino proposed by Thor Equities for Coney Island.

== Exhibitions ==
The History Project's exhibition center is located next to Deno's Wonder Wheel Amusement Park. The center occupies a former arcade booth, presenting educational exhibitions, events, and performances; displaying historic artifacts and documentary material from Coney Island's history. The collection holds many artifacts of Coney Island, including an authentic Steeplechase horse, part of Steeplechase Park.

In 2014, the history project presented an exhibition on the history of the Steeplechase Face.

In 2018, the Coney Island History Project presented an exhibition examining the history of Coney Island Creek. After the exhibit, the History Project has presented mobile exhibitions on the Coney Island Creek including one at City of Water Day on the Coney Island Creek in Kaiser Park, co-hosted with the Coney Island Beautification Project and the Waterfront Alliance.

=== The Wonder Gallery ===
In May 2026, the CIHP, in partnership with Parachute Literary Arts, opened The Wonder Gallery at the CIHP exhibit center. The founders, Amanda Deutch and Charles Denson, stated the goal of The Wonder Gallery is for it to be a space that "highlights Coney Island’s cultural and ecological aspects." The inaugural exhibit features two Brooklyn artists: documentary photography by Anders Goldfarb and “The Coney Island Zine Machine,” an interactive sculpture showcasing miniature zines by Kelly Luu.

== Guided tours ==
The Coney Island History Project offers guided tours of Coney Island. In 2019, the CIHP offered an immigrant Heritage Tour of Coney Island in English and Mandarin. The special walking tour was offered free of charge as part of Immigrant Heritage Week 2019.

== See also ==
- Charles Denson - Co-founder and executive director
- Coney Island USA - Another nonprofit related to Coney Island history
