= Quester I =

NY landmark in Coney Island Creek

Coordinates: 40.5817°N 73.9944°W

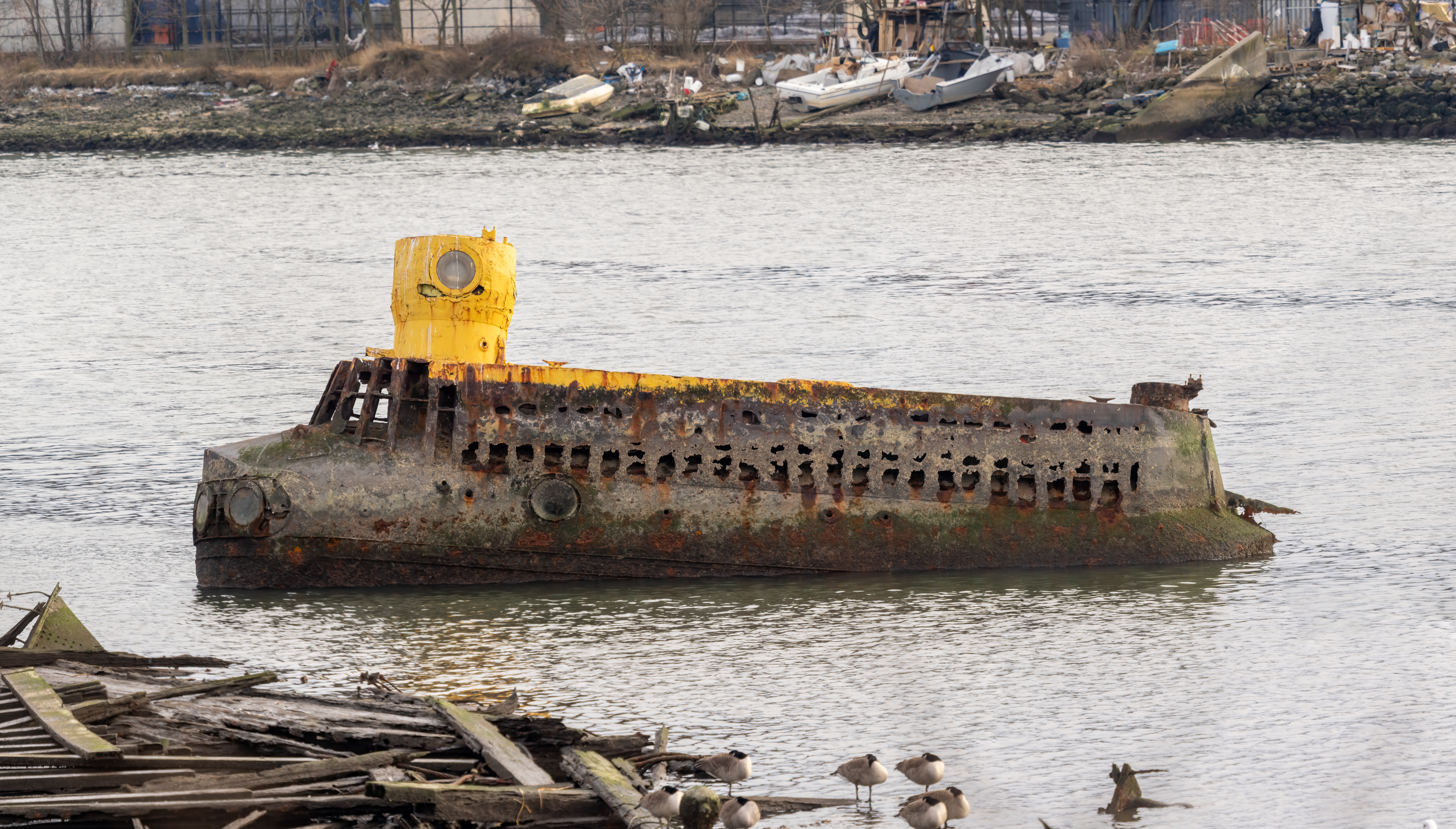
Quester I wrecked in Coney Island Creek

Quester I is the name of a 45-foot (14 m) submarine built in 1967 by Jerry Bianco, a shipyard worker in Brooklyn, New York City. Bianco built the submarine from salvaged metal, with the goal of either raising, or salvaging valuables from, the wreck of the Italian passenger liner SS Andrea Doria, which sank off Nantucket Sound in 1956 after being hit broadside by another liner.

== Launch attempt ==
In 1967, after three years of part-time construction efforts, Bianco prepared to launch the submarine. While lowering it down with a crane, the vessel tipped sideways and became stuck in the mud. Bianco tried to recover the vessel, but was unable to raise sufficient funds for the effort. However, one source claims that the vessel was eventually unstuck and was sailed up and down the bay before sinking at its mooring in the bay. Another story explains that the launch failure was due to the crane operator's disregarding the builder's directions; since only partial ballast had been placed inside the submarine (to save money), it was unstable, and thus was to be held in position by the crane while the ballast would be properly repositioned. Placing it completely into the water, the unstable craft rolled onto its side. This story states that "Bianco later refilled the ballast and tethered the sub, but his backers' enthusiasm waned, and he could never return to the project. Eventually some of the sub's parts were stolen, and it got loose from its moorings in 1981."

== Present day ==
As of 2024 the vessel was either largely or partly visible (depending on the tide) above the Coney Island Creek's water. It was painted bright yellow at launch; but it developed a sheen of orange rust. The cap and part of its upper section, which remain unsubmerged, were restored to bright yellow in 2015 by environmental nonprofit HarborLAB using ecologically benign paint. This was to preserve the sight and to seal in as much of the original toxic and carcinogenic zinc chromate paint as possible
