= Coney Island Creek =

Creek in Brooklyn, New York

Coordinates: 40°34′45″N 73°59′20″W

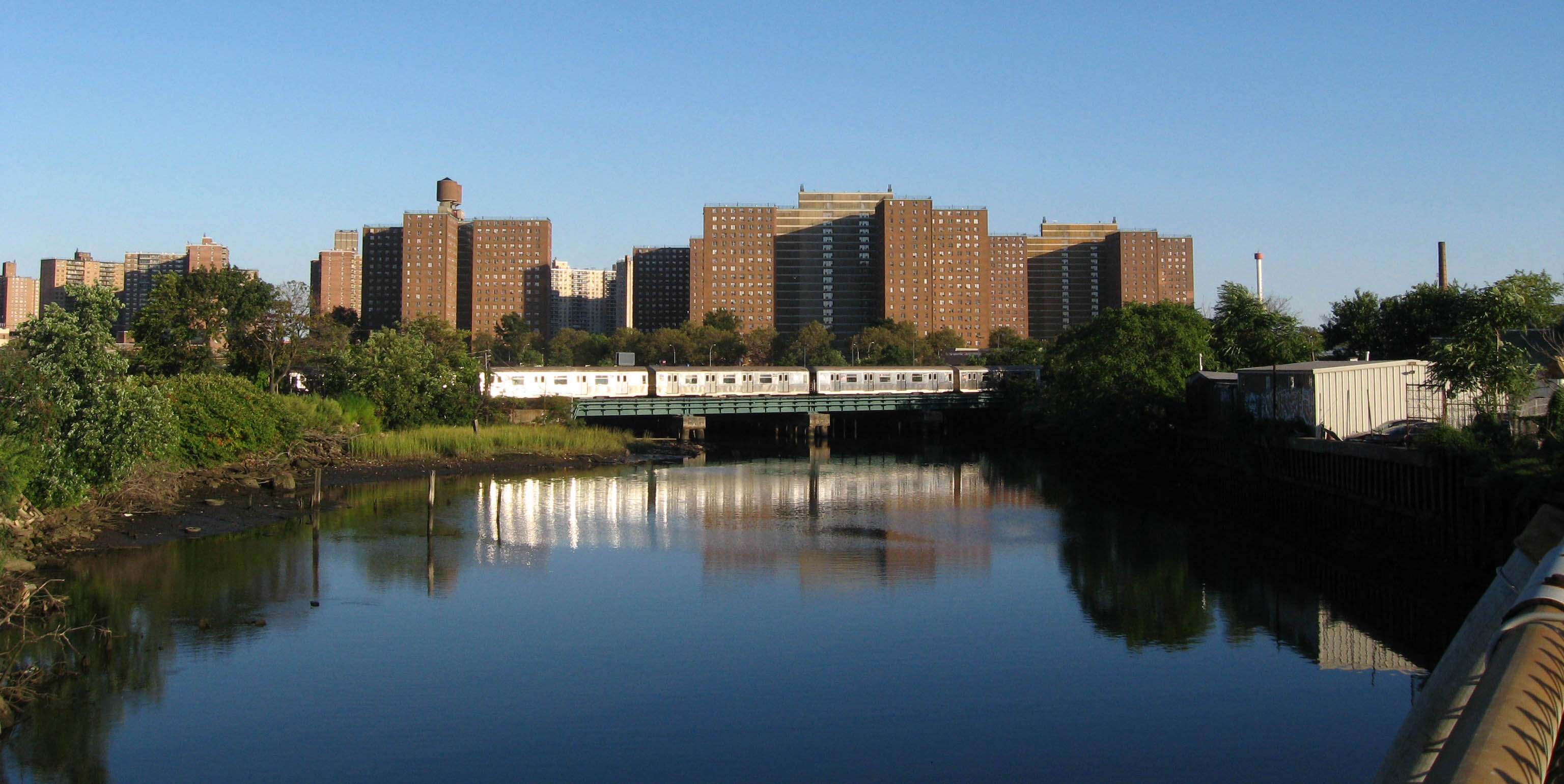
- A New York City Subway train crossing the Coney Island Creek

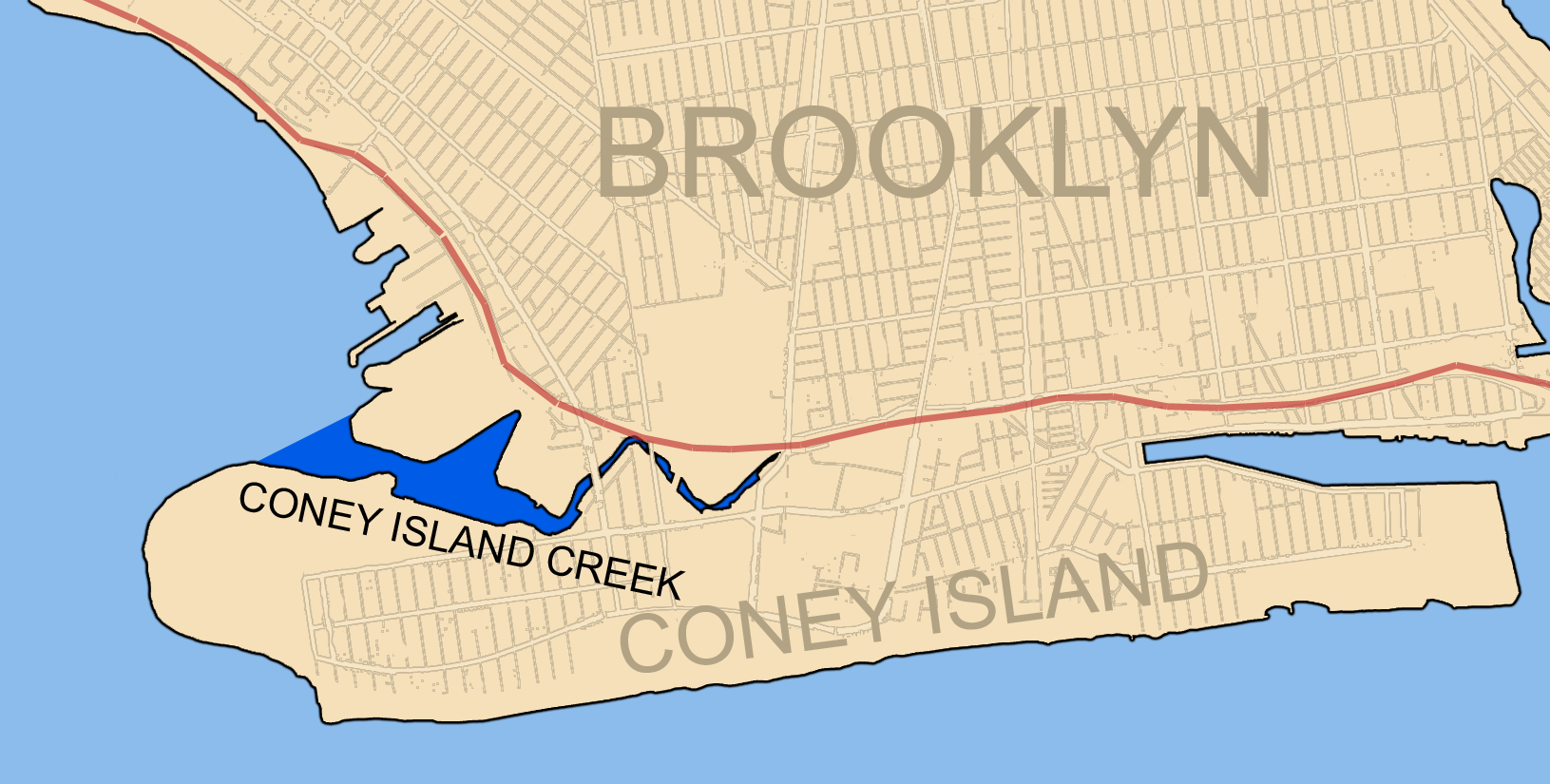

Location
- Country: United States
- State: New York
- City: New York City
- Borough: Brooklyn

Physical characteristics
- Source: Shell Road (emerging from storm drain under the road)
- Mouth: Gravesend Bay
- Length: 1.8 mi (2.9 km)

Coney Island Creek is a 1.8-mile-long (2.9 km) tidal inlet in Brooklyn, New York City. It was created from a series of streams and inlets by land filling and digging activities starting in the mid-18th century which, by the 19th century, became a 3-mile-long (4.8 km) continual strait and a partial mudflat connecting Gravesend Bay and Sheepshead Bay, separating Coney Island from the mainland. The strait was closed off in the early 20th century due to further land development and later construction projects. Today only the western half of Coney Island Creek exists. What once was a thriving fish and oyster population in salt marshes, freshwater streams, and expansive forests is now an unnatural environment wrecked by industrial pollution and construction debris. Urbanization of the city and man-made conditions have led to dumping of sewage and discarded materials, including cars and ship parts. The urbanization and pollution of the creek have caused the low-income and diverse community residing nearby to face many environmental injustices, such as health risks and environmental safety hazards. Restoration projects are limited and most conservation efforts are seen to be performed by the local community.

== Course ==
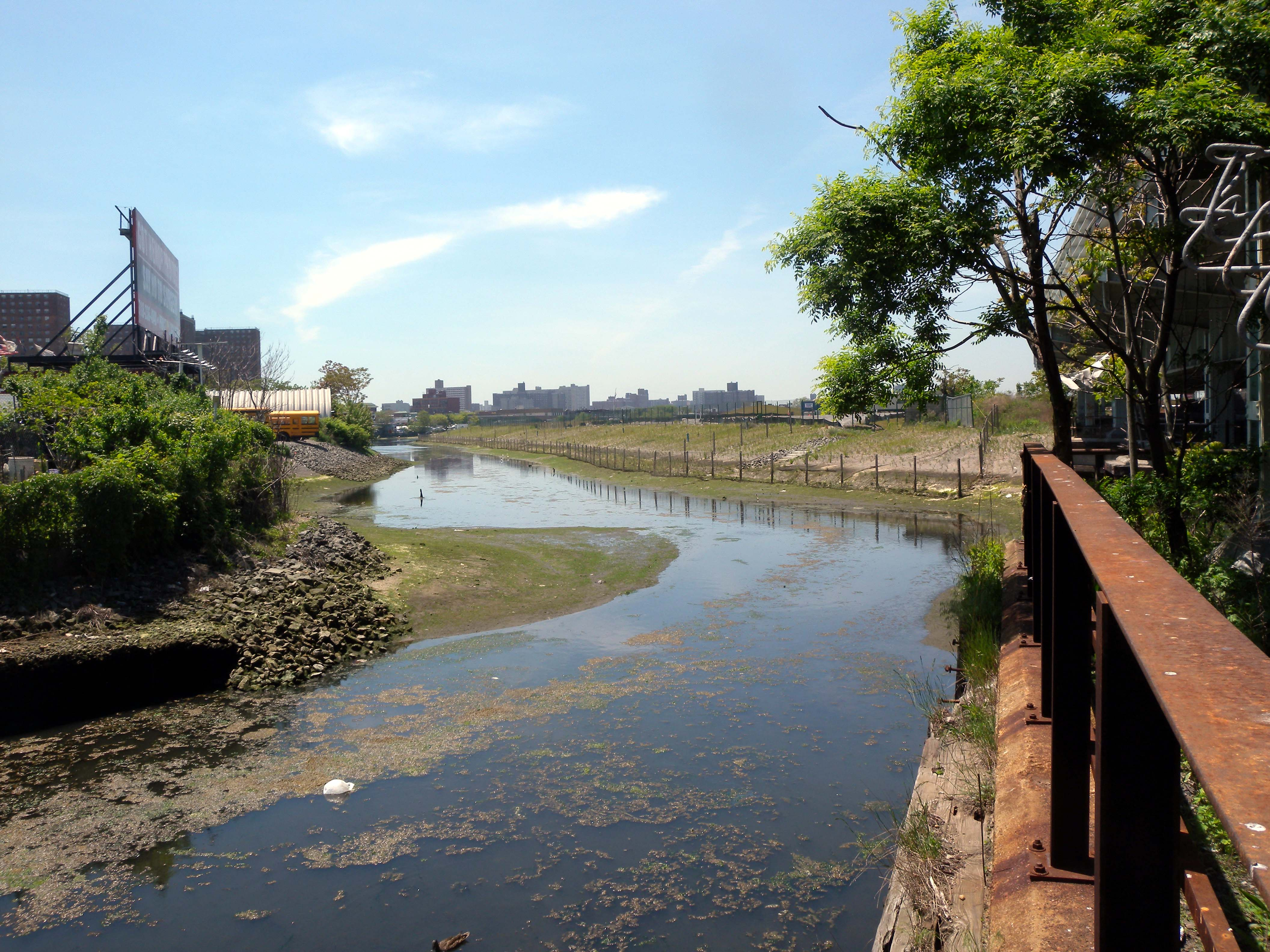
Shell Road terminus of Coney Island Creek

Coney Island Creek extends eastward 1.8 miles (2.9 km) from Gravesend Bay to Shell Road and separates the west end of Coney Island from the neighborhoods of Gravesend and Bath Beach. The west end of the creek is bordered by Coney Island Creek Park and Kaiser Park on the south side, and Calvert Vaux Park on the north side. The creek is crossed by the Cropsey Avenue and Stillwell Avenue bridges as well as two parallel rail trestles carrying the West End and Sea Beach subway lines (respectively served by the D, R, and W trains and N train). The eastern end is bordered by the Shore Parkway on the north side and Neptune Avenue on the south side. The eastern portion of Coney Island Creek runs along private industrial property and several acres formerly owned by Keyspan, the local electricity provider. The creek terminates at Shell Road where a storm sewer emerges from under the road (designated stormwater outfall CI-641 in city plans).

== History ==
=== Extensions and infilling ===
Before the 17th century, the Lenape people, a Native American tribe, inhabited the land now called Coney Island. The arrival of the Dutch in the 17th century led to the expulsion of the Lenape from their homeland. A wall was built around the settlement to keep the Lenape out of their territory. The Dutch claim that the land was "purchased" from the Lenape, but the Lenape people disagree and understand the "purchase" as a forced removal. According to the Coney Island People's Planning Process, they "thrived along the coast, relying heavily on the island's abundant natural resources".

Although the Lenape were removed from their territory, there are still many indigenous people living in New York City. According to Sutton King, a member of the Menominee and Oneida nations and president of the Urban Indigenous Collective, "[There are] over 181,000 Indigenous peoples living in New York City". While most of the Lenape were removed from their homeland and had to go to other places like Oklahoma, the descendants of the Lenape people still actively try to keep their presence in New York City Efforts such as the Smithsonian museum, which is a museum that "features exhibits that explore Native American history and showcase contemporary Native art and heritage" and the Lenape center in New York City, which aims to "promote Native American arts and humanities, environmental stewardship and Lenape identity" are working to keep the Lenape history known in NYC.

At the time of European settlement, Coney Island Creek was full of rabbits. This is why the island is named Coney because it comes from the Dutch word Konijin, meaning rabbits. The land that makes up the present day Coney Island was several barrier islands with interconnecting waterways that were all constantly changing shape. Coney Island Creek was once primarily characterized by salt marshes, hardwood forests, and freshwater streams. The waterway that became Coney Island Creek did not originally extend across the back side of the island since part of the land on the west end was a peninsula called Coney Hook. Hubbard's Creek, which ran down the eastern side of the peninsula, connected directly with the ocean. In 1750 a 0.25-mile-long canal (called the "Jamaica Ditch") was dug through the Coney Hook salt-marsh from a creek connecting to Gravesend Bay east to Hubbard's creek. This new waterway, allowing shipping traffic to travel from Jamaica Bay to New York Harbor without having to venture out into the ocean, connected Gravesend Bay and Sheepshead Bay together. The waterway behind the islands was called Gravesend Creek in the early 19th century since it cut below the town of Gravesend (later the name was used interchangeably with "Coney Island Creek"). Eventually Hubbard's and the other creeks and inlets that separated the islands were filled by a combination of natural process and land development, leaving just a single island that came to be called Coney Island and a single creek behind it that came to be called Coney Island Creek.

In August 1776, the Battle of Brooklyn took place on the distant marshy fields of Gowanus and Red Hook, where a British invasion force from Staten Island prepared to attack New York City. The landing on the beaches of Gravesend marked the beginning of the Battle of Brooklyn. This battle, also referred to as the Battle of Long Island, began the New York and New Jersey campaign, the first major armed campaign for the colonies following their Declaration of Independence from Great Britain. This battle resulted in the retreat of General George Washington and the Continental Army from Brooklyn Heights, forcing them to cross the East River and regroup in Manhattan.

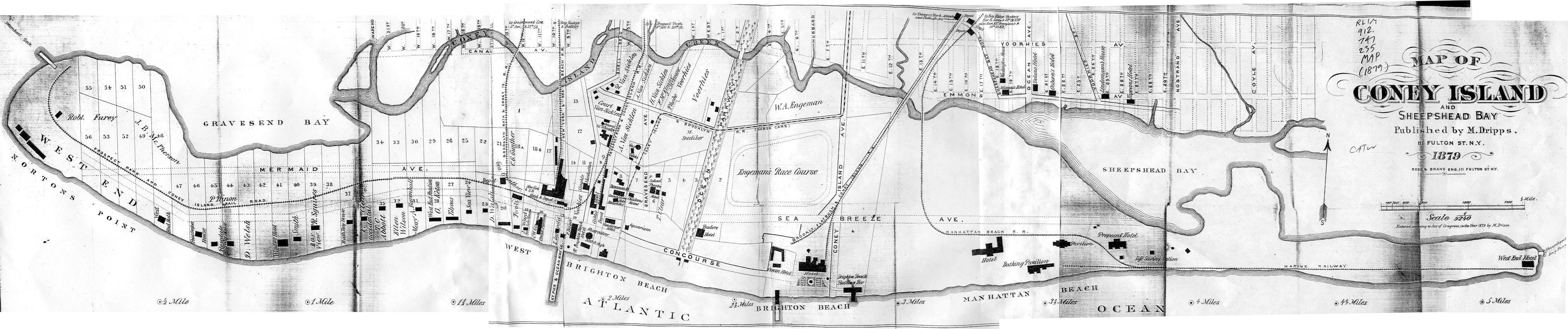
1879 map of Coney Island with Coney Island Creek running across the top of the island (planned canal and expansion of the urban grid can be seen overlaid in the map)

Coney Island Creek was still a minimally navigable waterway over its 3-mile length through the turn of the 20th century. By the early part of the century, industries started to develop around the creek. This resulted in it becoming polluted with substances including arsenic, cyanide, and benzene. The largest polluters included the Brooklyn Yarn Dye Company and the Brooklyn Union Gas Company.

In a period from the late 19th century through the early 20th century there were plans to turn the creek into the Gravesend Ship Canal. It would re-dredge the creek into a canal running in a straight east–west line and fill all the marsh land on either side of the creek to expand the urban grid to the edge of the canal. The plan was eventually abandoned and by 1924 local land owners had filled a portion of the creek. A major section of the creek was further filled in to allow construction of the Belt Parkway in the 1930s. More fill was added in 1962 with the construction of the Verrazzano–Narrows Bridge. This turned Coney Island Creek into an inlet with the western and eastern ends of the island becoming peninsulas. None of the creek remains at the eastern end. That terminus, Sheepshead Bay, has been dredged and, for the most part, enclosed in bulkheads. The path of the landfill of what used to be the creek follows Shore Parkway, Guider Avenue, and the triangular block between Neptune Avenue and Cass Place to a bulkhead at Sheepshead Bay.

=== Current status ===
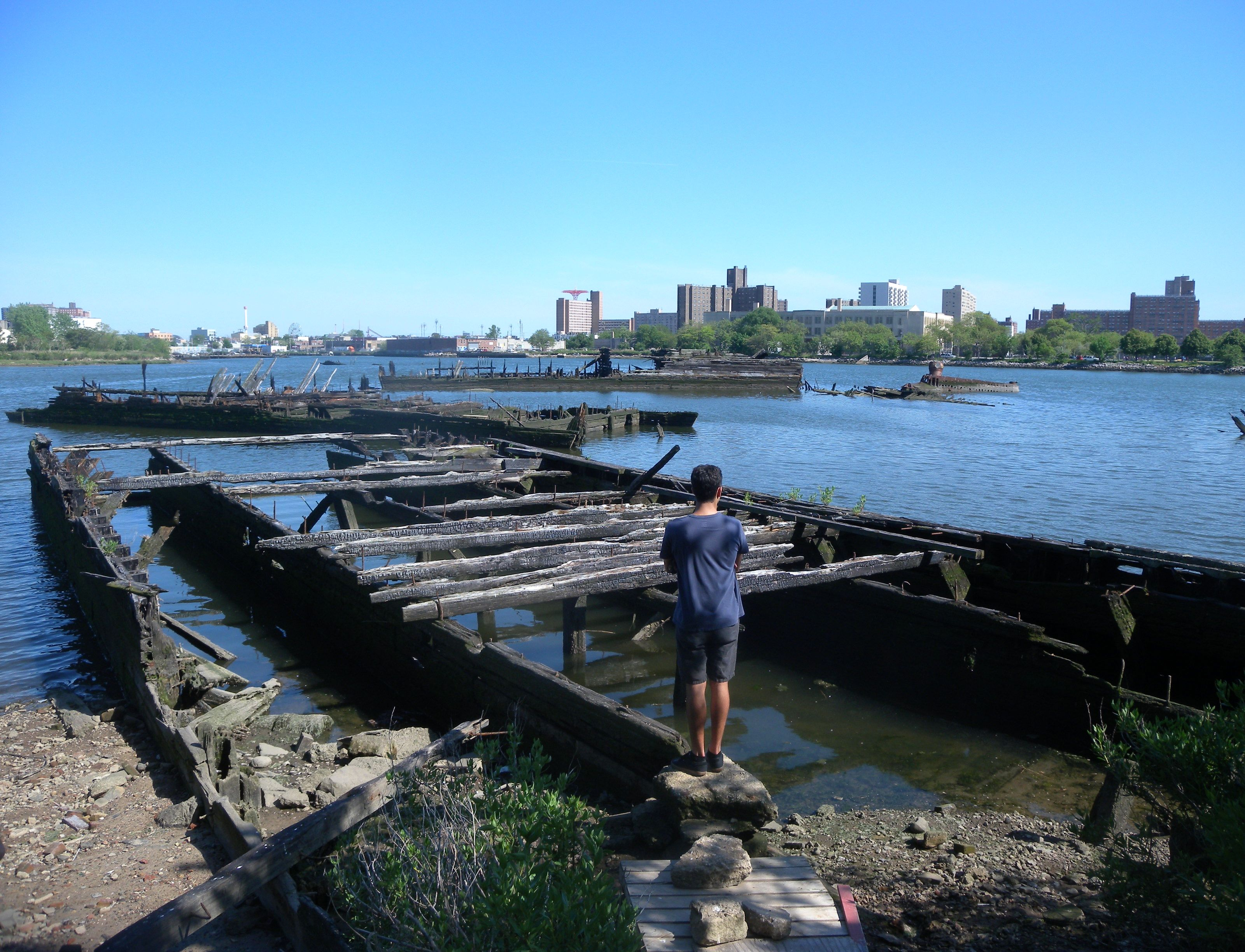
Burnt, sunken barges in Gravesend Bay mouth of the creek

A northwestern part of the creek is known as a "ship graveyard" for the dead and abandoned ships found there. At the southern shore of the creek, the remains of a 45 feet (14 m) yellow submarine, the Quester I, protrudes from the water. Built from salvaged metal in the late 1960s, it was never able to maintain an even keel and was abandoned. There are other leftover shipwrecks left in the creek, but their origins are somewhat unknown. They either are left over from The Battle of Brooklyn, or they are left over from when the creek was somewhat active in the 20th century. The creek is also used for performing baptisms.

The health and behavior of marine life in Coney Island Creek have been impacted by environmental factors and human activities in previous years. Pollution from nearby urban development has degraded water quality, leading to harmful substances lingering in the water that could affect marine life. Additionally, the creek's confined space and fluctuating tides can trap marine animals, as evidenced by the 2013 incident involving a dolphin that became disoriented and stranded. This dolphin became trapped and was found dead in the creeks waterway. Incidents like these showcase the challenges faced by marine life in adapting to their changing habitat. There is an obvious need for conservation efforts and better management of local waterways to protect these vulnerable species.

In 2016, the New York City government found that a nearby apartment complex, Beach Haven Apartments, was dumping 200,000 U.S. gallons (760,000 L; 170,000 imp gal) of sewage each day into Coney Island Creek. The complex was fined $400,000 two years later. By late 2016, local residents were advocating the designation of the creek as a Superfund site, which would provide funding to clean the hazardous materials from the creek. Community members testified that auto shops on nearby Neptune Avenue were still dumping cars into the creek. The creek was expected to undergo some minor cleanup between 2018 and 2020. By late 2020, the United States Environmental Protection Agency (EPA) was considering designating the creek as a Superfund site. In a site inspection, the EPA found toxic levels of cyanide, iron, and volatile organic compounds (VOCs) in the sediment and surface water samples of the Coney Island Creek. However, the EPA has not yet called for an official cleanup of the creek nor designated it as a Superfund site despite the community still using the creek for recreational purposes.

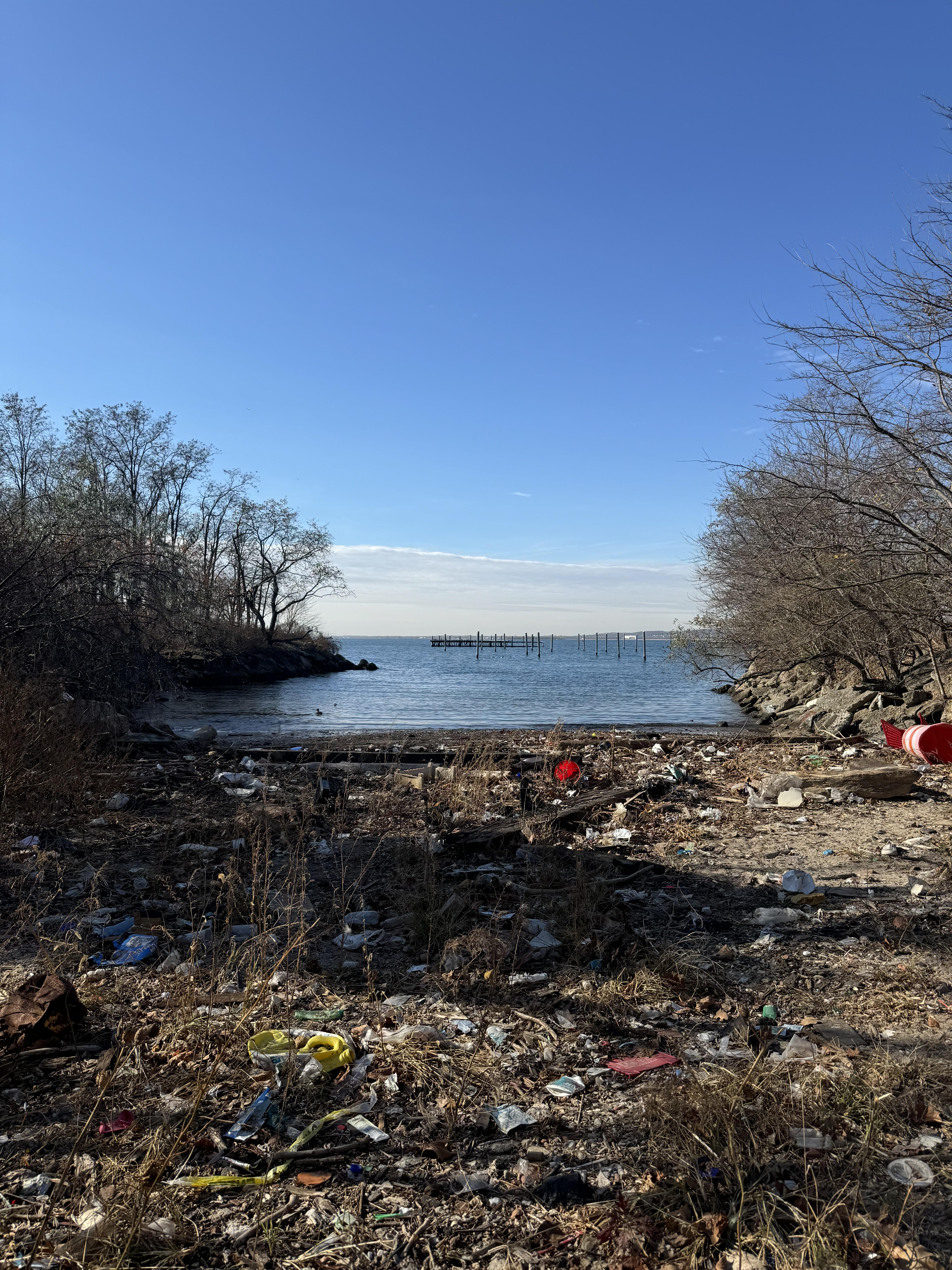
Pollution washed up along the shore line of Coney Island Creek.

In 2018, the Coney Island History Project opened an exhibition about the history of the Coney Island creek titled: "Coney Island Creek and the Natural World."

In recent years, there have been several efforts made to help restore the ecosystem of Coney Island Creek, one of which being The Billion Oyster Project. The Billion Oyster Project is a significant initiative aimed at restoring the oyster population in New York Harbor, particularly in areas like Coney Island Creek. In 2018, the Billion Oyster Project focused on Coney Island Creek for several reasons. Historically, this area was home to a thriving oyster population, representing a crucial part of New York Harbor's natural heritage. By restoring oysters in Coney Island Creek, the project aims to demonstrate that even urban environments can support healthy ecosystems. The creek has faced significant pollution and degradation over the years, and the project seeks to improve water quality through the natural filtration capabilities of oysters, helping to mitigate the impacts of urban runoff and pollutants. Additionally, Coney Island Creek provides an accessible location for local community engagement and education, encouraging schools and community members to participate in hands-on restoration activities and fostering a sense of stewardship for the environment. The diverse habitats in the creek can benefit from the introduction of oyster reefs, promoting increased biodiversity essential for the overall health of the marine ecosystem. Furthermore, Coney Island Creek is vulnerable to flooding and erosion, particularly during storms, restoring oyster reefs contributes to natural coastal protection, helping to buffer against storm surges and enhance resilience. Overall, the Billion Oyster Project's focus on Coney Island Creek reflects a commitment to environmental restoration and community involvement in a vital urban area.

In 2020, the city planned to build a NYC Ferry dock along the creek off Kaiser Park. The ferry dock would be the terminal of a new route to Pier 11/Wall Street; the route, announced in 2019, was to have begun operations in 2021. Local activists rallied against the dock plan, arguing it would disrupt the ecosystems of the creek. There were also concerns that the addition of ferry service would worsen pollution in the creek. The implementation of the Coney Island ferry route was delayed and, in mid-2022, the EDC announced that the ferry route had been postponed indefinitely. One problem was that the sand in the Coney Island Creek shifted frequently, hampering efforts to construct a ferry pier there. Another issue was that the creek itself was heavily polluted, and a Superfund cleanup project was being planned for the creek. Independent news site Hell Gate subsequently reported that test boats had repeatedly run aground in Coney Island Creek and that sand had returned to the creek after it was partially dredged in 2021. A ferry in Coney Island Creek also faced much opposition from the local residents who believed it would lead to additional air, water, and noise pollution and reduce safe playing area for children and families.

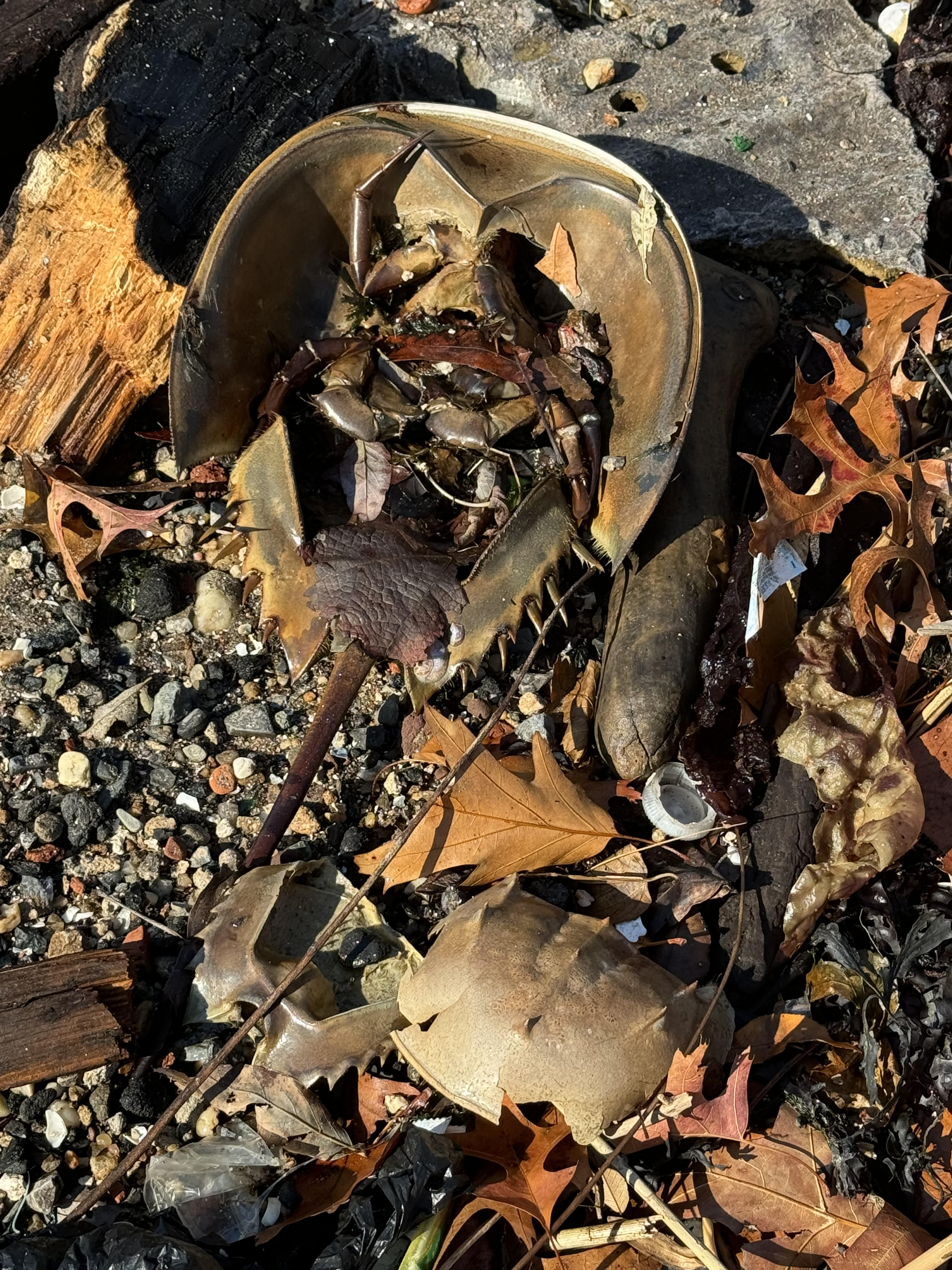
Dead horseshoe crab found along the Coney Island Creek shore line among garbage.

Despite the recent restoration efforts over the years, Coney Island Creek is still filled with litter from the surrounding urban area and continues to affect the creek to this day. Washed up along the shore line of the creek are various types of garbage including plastic bags, broken pieces of glass. Along the creek bank, dead marine creatures have been found before such as horseshoe crabs, sand crabs, and shark eggs. Environmental organizations, such as the National Wildlife Federation and the Coney Island Beautification Project, suggest that to recover the Coney Island Creek and heal the ecosystem, there needs to be further restoration projects.

== Biodiversity ==
=== Urban wildlife ===
The Coney Island Creek, though within the highly developed area of Brooklyn, provides a very important habitat for various species, mainly birds, fish, and invertebrates.These tidal estuaries offer a peculiar combination of salt and fresh water that enables the tidal estuary to support various species. This natural variation in salinity, along with the sheltered environment, creates the creek as an important breeding and feeding ground for many species. In a similar way, urban estuaries such as Coney Island Creek support ecological resilience by offering refuge to species and allowing populations to recover after disturbances. For example, meta-population dynamics, where semi-isolated groups of individuals can interbreed across habitats, can enhance the resilience of the native species, even in the urban environments. These environments further allow for adaptation by species to more environmental stressors, such as pollution and variable salinity levels.

The aquatic animals at Coney Island Creek exhibit high plasticity regarding their feeding and reproductive behaviors in response to changes in salinity, sediment conditions and urban runoff. Terrestrial species, including avian populations and small mammals, use urban vegetation and artificial structures like light poles and construction debris as refuge from inclement weather and nesting sites. These adaptations bring out the role of the creek as an important ecological corridor amidst intense urbanization.

=== Terrestrial species ===
As many as 244 bird species have been recorded at Coney Island Creek. They include Horned larks, Snow buntings, and American oystercatchers. The visits of these various species of birds rely on migratory patterns that are influenced by changing environments, altered magnetic fields, necessity for breeding and food resources.

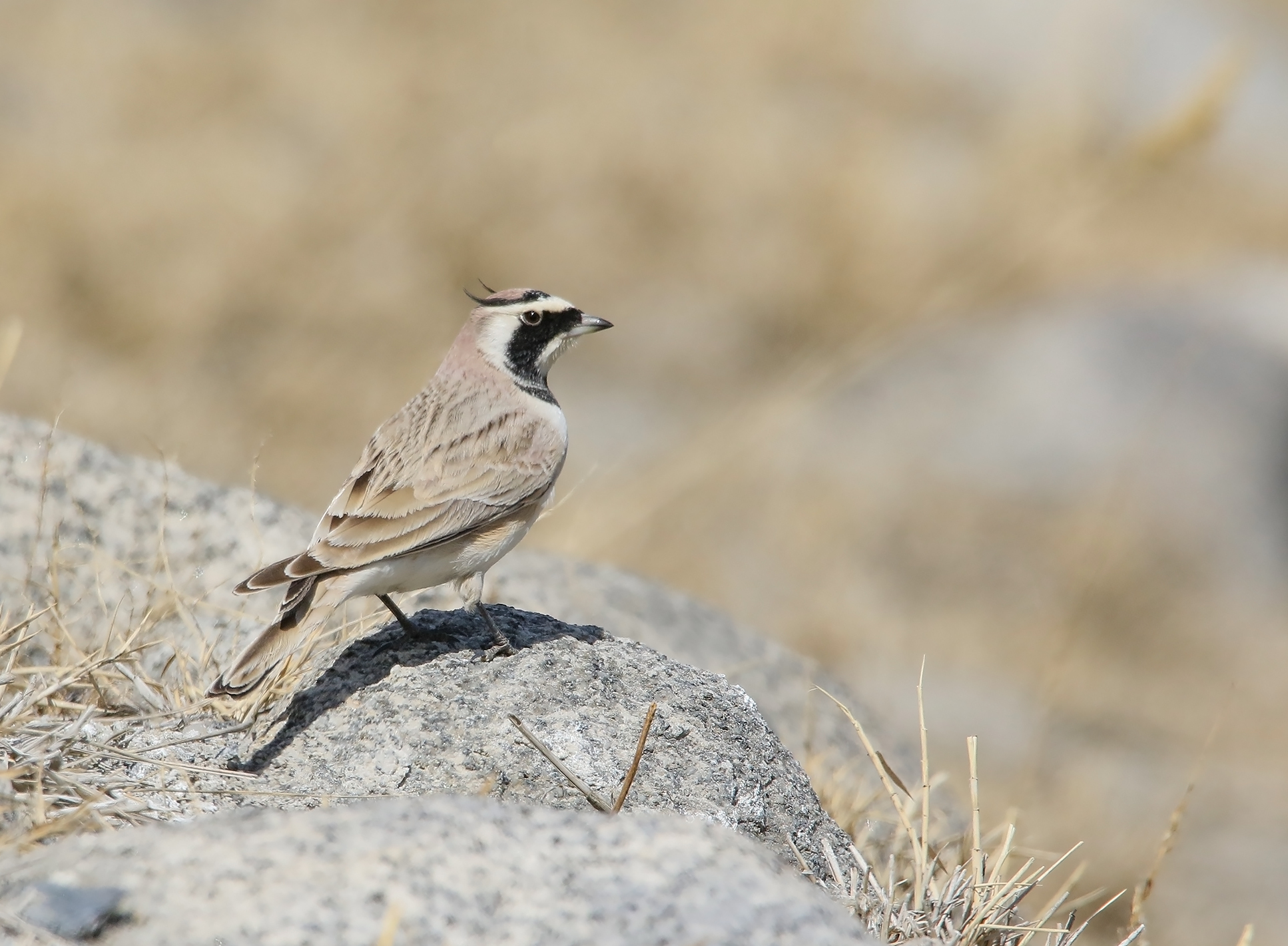
Horned lark on a rock in Pakistan

- Horned larks (Eremophila alpestris): During their migration and winter seasons, the Horned Larks can be found in the large, open areas surrounding Coney Island Creek. They forage on the ground for seeds and insects, and with their brilliant camouflage, they blend well with the sand and litter that defines the creek landscape. They can thus be found here, adding to the importance of open and undisturbed patches of natural areas within an urban setting to maintain the populations of migratory birds.

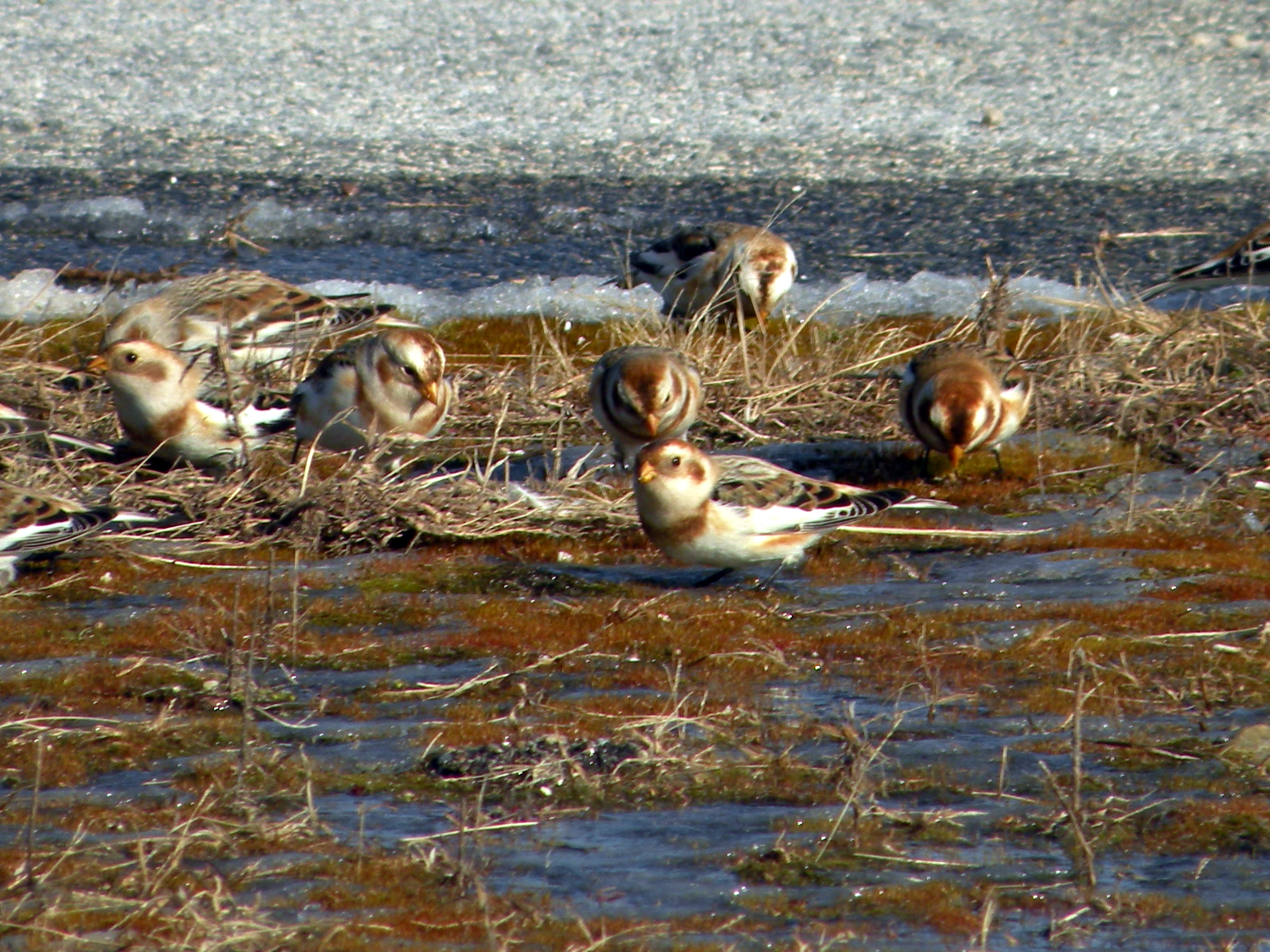
Snow buntings on beach.

- Snow buntings (Plectrophenax nivalis): This species of bird could be observed on the shores of Coney Island Creek and other nearby sandy or weedy areas in winter. The birds forage for seeds and shelter along the debris zones formed by tidal movements. This adaptation to shoreline habits underscores the role of the creek in providing seasonal resources for migratory songbirds, especially in urban settings where natural habitats are often scarce.

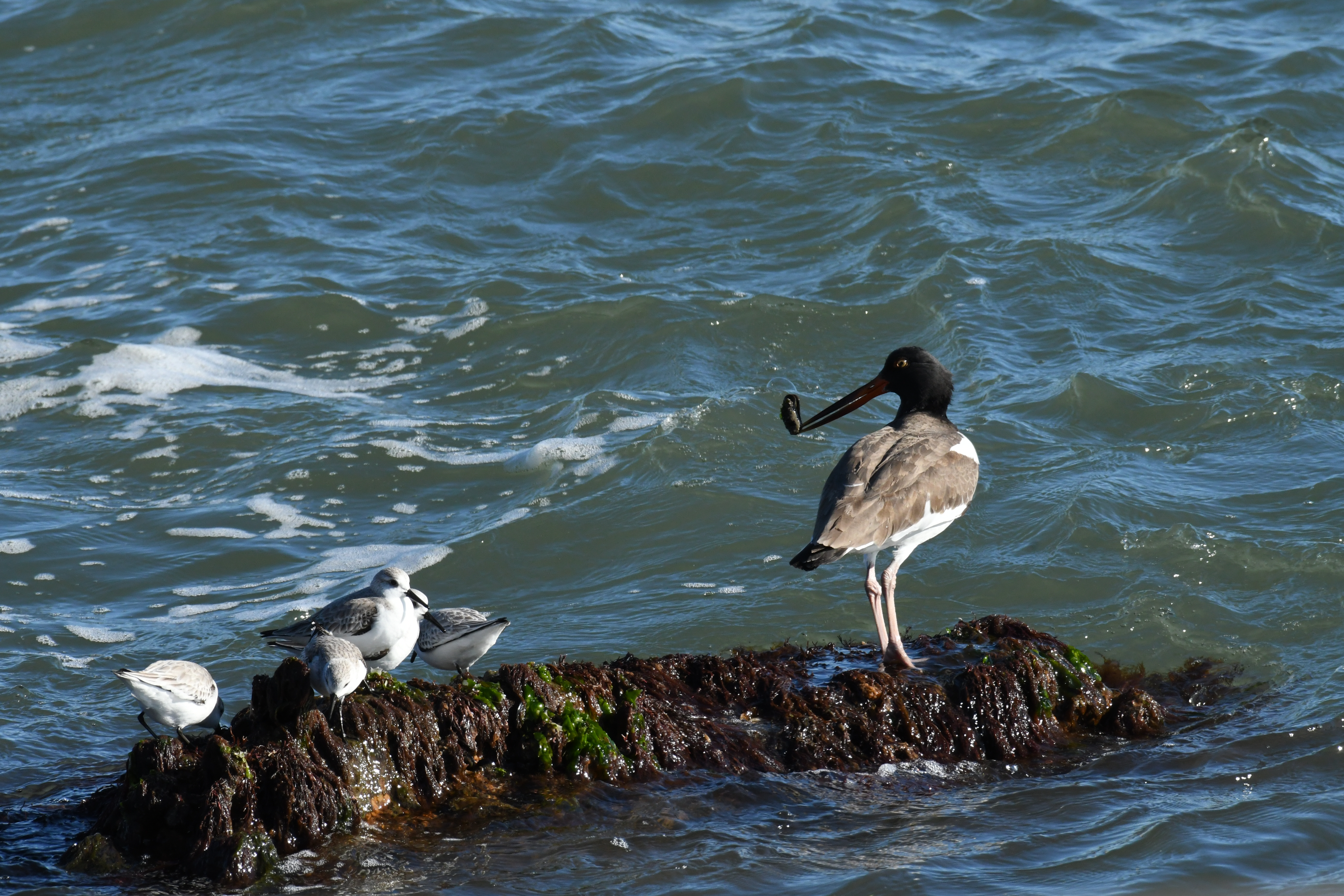
American oystercatcher on rocks.

- American oystercatchers (Haematopus palliatus): American Oystercatchers are sentinel shorebird species; they are commonly seen in large numbers during breeding and foraging in Coney Island Creek. These birds show a strong association with intertidal areas, where they forage for shellfish, crabs, and other marine organisms. The tide in the creek and the presence of a variety of food items make it a very vital habitat for these birds, indicating ecological interlinkages between urban waterways and their immediate environments.

=== Aquatic species ===
The Coney Island creek once served as a diverse habitat for fish and shellfish species such as oysters, where they were once found in great numbers. Unfortunately, natural environmental processes have been disrupted by industrial runoff, combined sewer overflows, and habitat degradation. This has led to the loss of certain native species and reduced the overall resilience of the ecosystem. For example, pollution contributes to eutrophication, which depletes oxygen levels in the water, making it challenging for some species to survive. Urbanization has also altered the creek's natural flow and salinity, crucial factors for aquatic biodiversity. Some of the native aquatic species found at Coney Island Creek are the striped bass and Atlantic silverside.

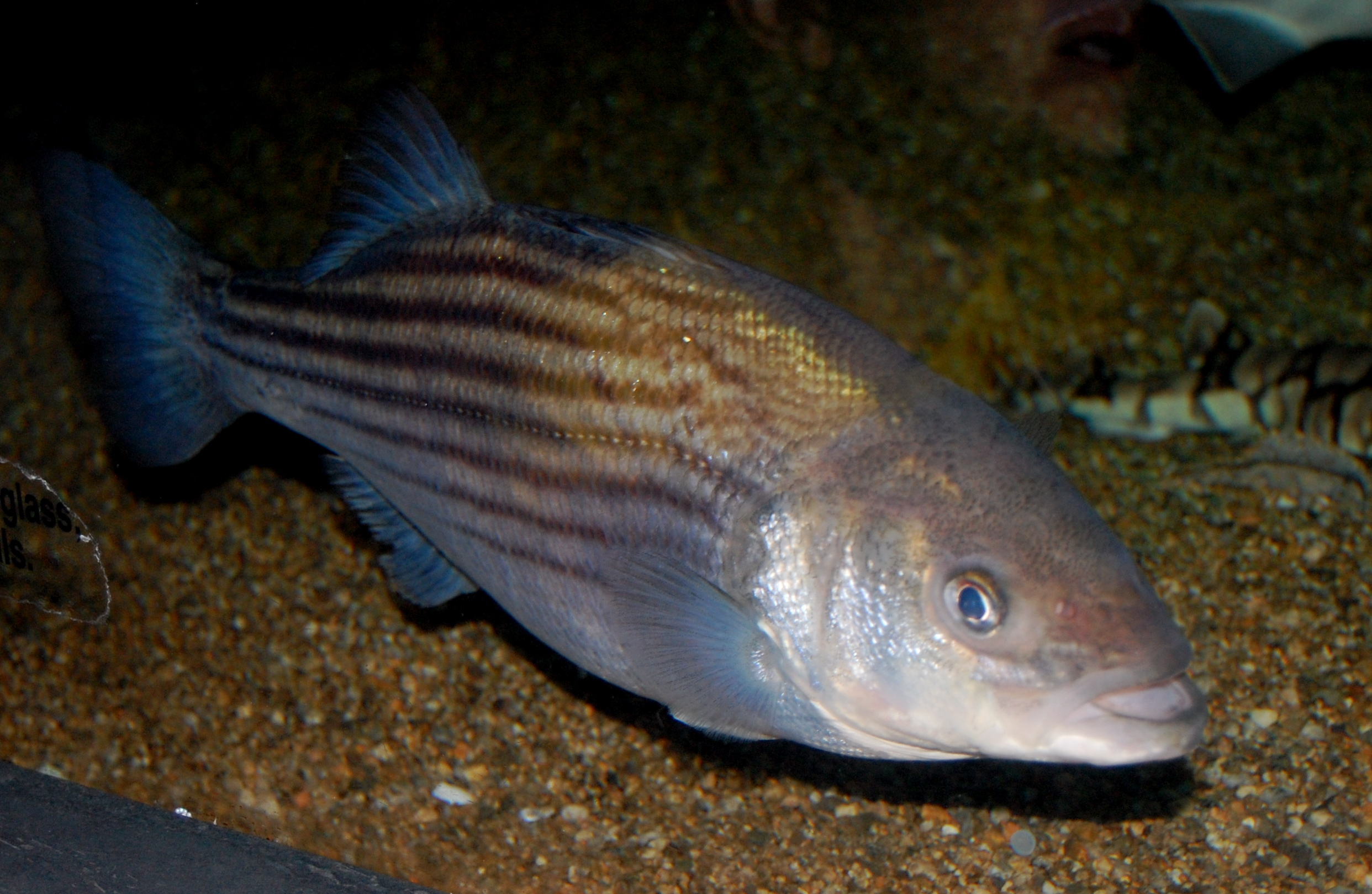
Striped Bass

- Striped Bass (Morone saxatilis): Striped bass are migratory, anadromous fish that utilize Coney Island Creek as a transitional habitat, particularly during migration between spawning grounds in freshwater and feeding grounds in marine environments. These fish are drawn to the creek due to its brackish waters, which offer a mix of saline and freshwater, supporting diverse prey species such as crustaceans and smaller fish. Striped bass play a significant role in the local food web by acting as apex predators, maintaining ecological balance in the creek's aquatic ecosystem.

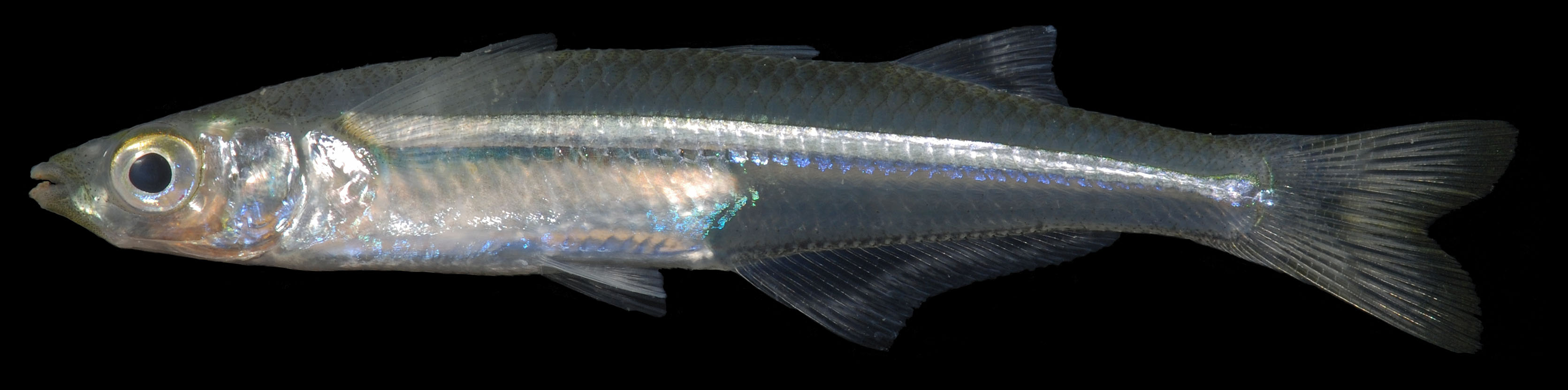
Atlantic Silverside

- Atlantic Silverside (Menidia menidia): These small schooling fish are abundant in estuarine environments like Coney Island Creek, where they serve as a critical prey species for larger fish and birds. Atlantic silversides thrive in the creek due to its shallow waters, which provide protection from predators. Their high reproductive rate and adaptability to varying salinity levels make them a key component of the creek's biodiversity.

== Physical Changes to the Creek: 17^{th} Century to Present Day ==
Since the time of European settlement in the 17th century, the creek and land surrounding Coney Island Creek have changed drastically. This is mostly due to urbanization and increased pollution. Before colonization, there were forests, salt marshes, and clean freshwater. These natural features helped protect the landscape with buffer zones and tidal marshes, but due to these changes, the landscape is no longer able to support these features, which has led to an increase in danger during times of flooding from storm surges and hurricanes. This is mainly due to the development of farmland and, later, to intense urbanization. The creek is no longer considered a "natural feature" and currently has old cars, boats, and garbage in the upper portion of the creek.

With physical changes come changes in the ecology of the creek. Before these changes, "shellfish and finfish were abundant in the waters of the region", and these fish were important for the indigenous people's diet. Due to increased pollution and runoff in the creek, the water has degraded over time. This has resulted in the decline of many native fish populations and has led to a lack of biodiversity in the creek. We can see from this how harmful intense urbanization can be and how it leads to long-term environmental consequences.

== Effects of Pollution on Local Community ==
The Coney Island Creek is located near a diverse community and has been polluted for many years. This has led to harmful on the local human community in addition to the environment. Coney Island Creek is a community that is very diverse. Research found in a study done by NYU Furman Center, 52% of residents are immigrant-born, a quarter of residents are elderly above the age of 65 years old, and it is a significantly low-income area. Coney Island Creek's pollution is important to note in this context because it shows how minorities and marginalized groups are more likely to be impacted by environmental pollution and hazards.

The contamination of the creek has had and continues to have an impact on the local human community. Over the past few decades, the Coney Island Creek has been contaminated with many toxic chemicals. Some of these toxic chemicals include "mercury, lead, pesticides, PCBs, and dioxins". These toxic chemicals are known to persist in the environment, which is why they are also referred to as "environmental pollutants". These environmental pollutants lead to many long-term effects and "significantly contribute to human disease" in those residing near the creek. These include physical and mental health risks.

These chemicals are known to cause significant health problems. In 2015, the International Agency for Research on Cancer classified PCBs as group one carcinogens. Exposure to a group one carcinogen can lead to the development of thyroid, colorectal, testicular, prostate, and breast cancer. PCB exposure to humans is also linked to metabolic diseases such as type 2 diabetes, obesity, hypertension, and dyslipidemia. PCBs are negatively impacting our future generation's health by leading to neonatal thyroid hormone status in pregnant women and infants. PCBs can reach infants via "utero exposure or breast milk consumption". As a result, residents living near the creek may face disproportionate health risks from pollution exposure.

The pollution also affects mental health and access to recreational services for nearby residents. Locals are used to swimming, playing, and enjoying time outside, but due to the contamination, either residents cannot take advantage of their green spaces, or they are continuing to swim in the creek, unknowingly swimming in dangerous waters. According to the Environmental Protection Agency, the creek is "13 times the standard of 200 colonies per that amount considered to be safe for swimming". Swimming in this can lead to internal parasites, viral respiratory infections, and hepatitis. Locals have already reported illness after swimming in the creek. People are also slowly spending less time outside in the area due to the strong smell. The smell has gotten so intense that some call it the "Coney Island Reek".

In addition to the many health risks posed, the pollution of the creek has many other effects on the local community. Another way the creek's pollution has affected the local human community is by compromising food safety and subsistence fishing. When the water is contaminated, so are the fish living there. People residing near the creek have been using it to fish for food for many years, and now are left to consume contaminated fish. For some people, this is the food that they rely on for food security, and consuming contaminated fish can lead to illnesses, according to the Environmental Protection Agency. These illnesses include: "cancer, kidney failure, adverse neurological effect, cardiovascular diseases, and so on to vulnerable groups such as pregnant, child breast-feeding and children".

There have been few efforts to educate the locals about the dangers of consuming fish from the creek. One resident said, "There's no educational effort. The city hasn't reached out and notified anybody - not the residents, not the local elected officials, not the stakeholders". Reporters are urging the city to make it known to all residents about the dangers of the pollutants so they can at least try to stay as safe as possible.

=== Conservation efforts ===
Although, there has been some ecological and environmental setbacks, Coney Island creek has been the focus of various conservation efforts aimed at restoring ecological health and enhancing resilience to environmental challenges. Some key initiatives include:

- Long-Term Control Plan (LTCP): To combat the negative impact of combined sewer overflows (CSOs) on Coney Island Creek, the New York City DEP created a Long-Term Control Plan (LTCP). This initiative focuses on upgrading infrastructure and implementing green projects to enhance water quality and protect marine ecosystems.
- Superfund Site Assessment:In response to community concerns about pollution, the U.S. Environmental Protection Agency (EPA) conducted a preliminary assessment of Coney Island Creek. The assessment aimed at determining the extent of contamination that existed and evaluating whether further clean up efforts under the Superfund program was warranted or needed.

Efforts by the Local Youth Community

Due to the lack of government involvement in improving the Coney Island Creek conditions, young residents are taking matters into their own hands to try to clean and restore their home. According to CBS News, one way they are getting involved to restore the creek is through Liberation Diploma Plus High School. Students enrolled in this school have been working to restore sand dunes at the creek in an effort to "fight beach erosion and restore the creek's shoreline". By restoring these sand dunes, students hope to mitigate storm surge and tidal floods that have been affecting people's homes near Coney Island.

Additionally, the Resilient Schools and Communities (RiSC) program, which is a climate resilience education initiative launched by the National Wildlife Federation, brought together 400 students to work to combat the effects of climate change. They planted "14,100 American beach grass culms and collected nearly 1,600 pounds of debris from the shoreline" on dunes to fortify the shoreline from flooding the local neighborhood. Teaching young residents about the environmental issues in their community can help them develop an emotional and physical attachment to the environment, which can ultimately inspire them to continue to restore and protect their home.

These conservation efforts, combined with the Billion Oyster project, represent a collaborative approach by government agencies, community organizations, and environmental groups toward restoring and preserving ecological integrity in Coney Island Creek.
