= Charles Denson =

American historian, writer, photographer, and art director

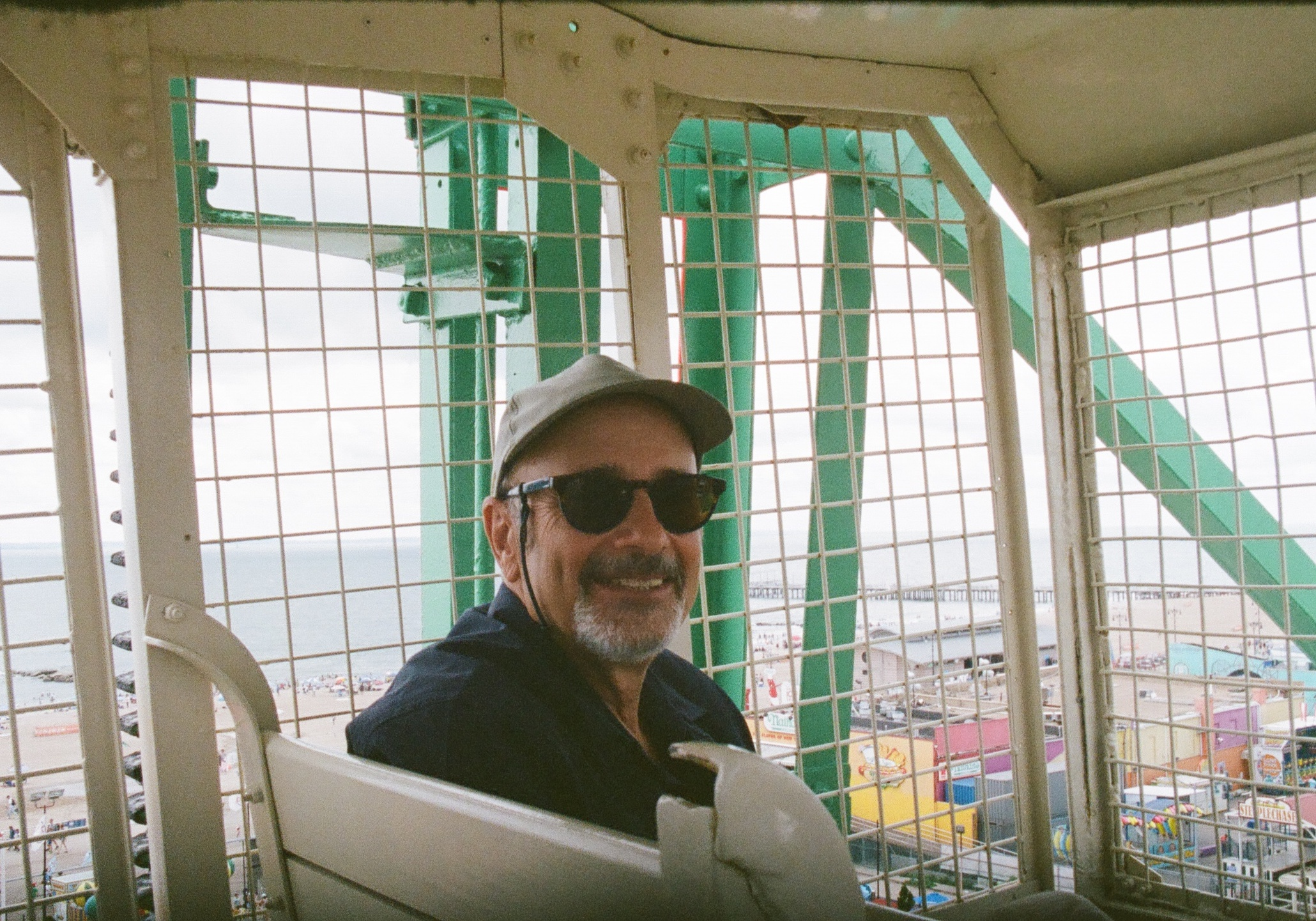
Charles Denson in 2021 on the Wonder Wheel

Charles Denson is an American historian, writer, photographer, and art director. He is co-founder and executive director of the nonprofit Coney Island History Project. Denson also manages a YouTube channel, blog, podcast, and Q&A page related to the history of Coney Island.

== Early life ==
Denson grew up in Coney Island, living on Surf Avenue and attending local schools. He showed a deep interest in the neighborhood from a young age; in an interview with the Brooklyn Daily Eagle he said, "My dream as a kid was to write a book about Coney Island."

During Denson's youth in the 1960s, Coney Island was experiencing a period of transformation. A government urban renewal program that called for the demolition of 60 blocks of homes and businesses had left the neighborhood in a state of ruin. Denson began to photograph the neighborhood and its local residents during this time as a teenager. These photographs would later make up the photo exhibit "Coney Island Streets: 1965–1975" at the Coney Island History Project. None of the structures shown in the photographs still stand today.

== Career ==
In 1971, Denson began his career as a photographer for New York magazine. Since then, he has worked as an art director for numerous publications. In 1999 he was awarded a Chronicle journalism fellowship at the Graduate School of Journalism at University of California, Berkeley.

Denson has authored multiple books on the history of Coney Island. His book Coney Island: Lost and Found won the New York Society Library's 2002 Book of the Year award.

In 2004, Denson founded the nonprofit organization Coney Island History Project with Carol Albert. The organization's first project was collecting oral histories of Coney Island. A booth was set up on the Coney Island boardwalk where people could record their personal accounts and experiences. Denson is currently executive director of the Coney Island History Project.

In 2009, Denson released a 58-minute documentary The Prince Of Mermaid Avenue following Major Meat Market's owner, Jimmy Prince, and his decision to retire and the difficult process of leaving the Coney Island community he loved and served. In 2011, Denson premiered The Last Immortal at the Coney Island Film Festival where it was awarded Best Documentary Feature. The film followed a reformed gang member from the Coney Island community returning home after a long prison sentence.

In 2013, the New York State Marine Education Association presented Denson with the Herman Melville Award for his environmental advocacy.

Denson has lectured on the history of Coney Island at institutions such as the New-York Historical Society, Brooklyn Historical Society, Brooklyn College, and the American Folk Art Museum, among others.

== Filmography ==
- “The Prince Of Mermaid Avenue” - 2009
- “The Last Immortal” - 2011

== Published works ==
- Coney Island Walking Tour: Map & Guide (1998) ISBN 978-0-9666982-0-6
- Coney Island: Lost and Found (2002) ISBN 978-1-58008-455-0
- Wild Ride!: A Coney Island Roller Coaster Family (2007) ISBN 978-0-9666982-1-3
- Coney Island and Astroland (2011) ISBN 978-0-7385-7428-8
- Coney Island: Visions of an American Dreamland 1861–2008 (2015) (in collaboration with other authors) ISBN 978-0-300-18990-2
- The Curious Coney Island Artwork of Casola & Millard (2018) OCLC 1057797686
- Coney Island's Wonder Wheel Park (2020) ISBN 978-1-4396-6997-6
- Salvation by the Sea: Immigrants, Coney Island, and the Fresh Air Cure (2023) OCLC 1458668728

== See also ==
- Coney Island History Project
