= Cropsey Avenue =

Avenue in Brooklyn, New York

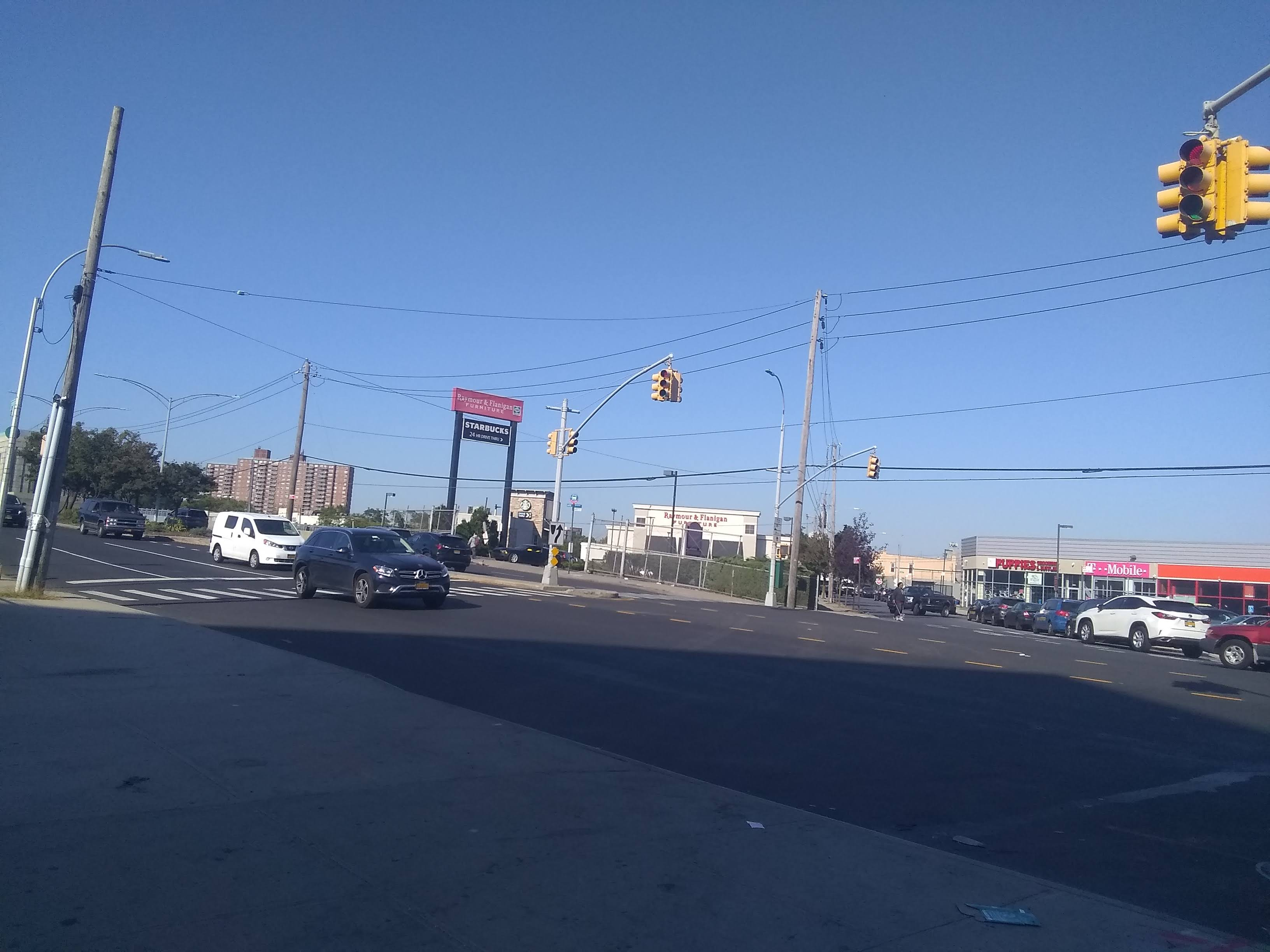
- At Hart Place, just south of the Coney Island Creek bridge
- Interactive map of Cropsey Avenue
- Owner: City of New York
- Maintained by: NYCDOT
- Location: Brooklyn, New York City
- Northwest end: Poly Place/14th Avenue in Bath Beach
- Southeast end: Neptune Avenue/West 17th Street in Coney Island

Cropsey Avenue is a major street in Brooklyn, New York City. It generally runs northwest-southeast, from Poly Place/14th Avenue in Bath Beach to Neptune Avenue/West 17th Street in Coney Island. It forms the northeastern boundary of Dreier-Offerman Park.

Cropsey Avenue intersects the Belt Parkway at exits 6-N and 6-S. South of its bridge crossing Coney Island Creek, Cropsey Avenue continues as West 17th Street at Neptune Avenue. For about half of its length (south of 23rd Avenue), Cropsey Avenue has a central median, making it a divided highway/boulevard.

The street is named for the Cropsey family, one of the first to settle in New Utrecht.

== Public transportation ==
Cropsey Avenue is served by the following New York City Bus routes:

- The B6 runs northbound from 26th Avenue to Bay Parkway in Bensonhurst, but is out of service from 25th Avenue to Bay 37th Street, changing its direction to Canarsie or East New York.
- The B8 serves the corridor north of 18th Avenue.
- The B82 serves the corridor south of Bay Parkway, with all Select Bus Service short-turning at Bay 37th Street.
- The entire corridor is served by select X28 and X38 buses to/from Sea Gate. All midday and weekend morning buses short-turn at Canal Avenue.

Additionally, the New York City Subway's BMT West End Line (D, R, and W trains) runs parallel to Cropsey Avenue, three blocks northeast on 86th Street, between 18th Avenue and 25th Avenue.
