= Gravesend Bay =

Body of water in New York City

Coordinates: 40°35′00.2″N 74°00′08.4″W

Southwest Brooklyn
Waterways connected to the Gravesend Bay estuary
1 Gravesend Bay
2 Coney Island Creek
3 The Narrows / Hudson River
4 Lower New York Bay
5 Sheepshead Bay

Gravesend Bay is an estuary that is connected to the Hudson River, Coney Island Creek, Lower New York Bay, and Sheepshead Bay. It is contained within the New York–New Jersey Harbor Estuary and is positioned just southeast of the Verrazzano–Narrows Bridge which spans The Narrows strait. It is often used as a place for ships to anchor because of the safety its partially enclosed space provides to boats.

Gravesend Bay is a migratory route for bottlenose dolphins and some species of whales. Parts of Dyker Beach Park and Golf Course, Bensonhurst Park, Calvert Vaux Park and Coney Island Creek Park abut Gravesend Bay. Neighborhoods in Brooklyn with shoreline along the bay include Sea Gate, Bath Beach, Gravesend, and Dyker Heights. The northwestern shoreline of Coney Island is positioned on Gravesend Bay.

== History ==
On August 21, 1776 the British landed their troops along the shores of Gravestone Bay in the days leading up to the Battle of Long Island during the American Revolutionary War. In the early 20th century the bay was home to an internationally known yacht racing club.

== Gallery ==
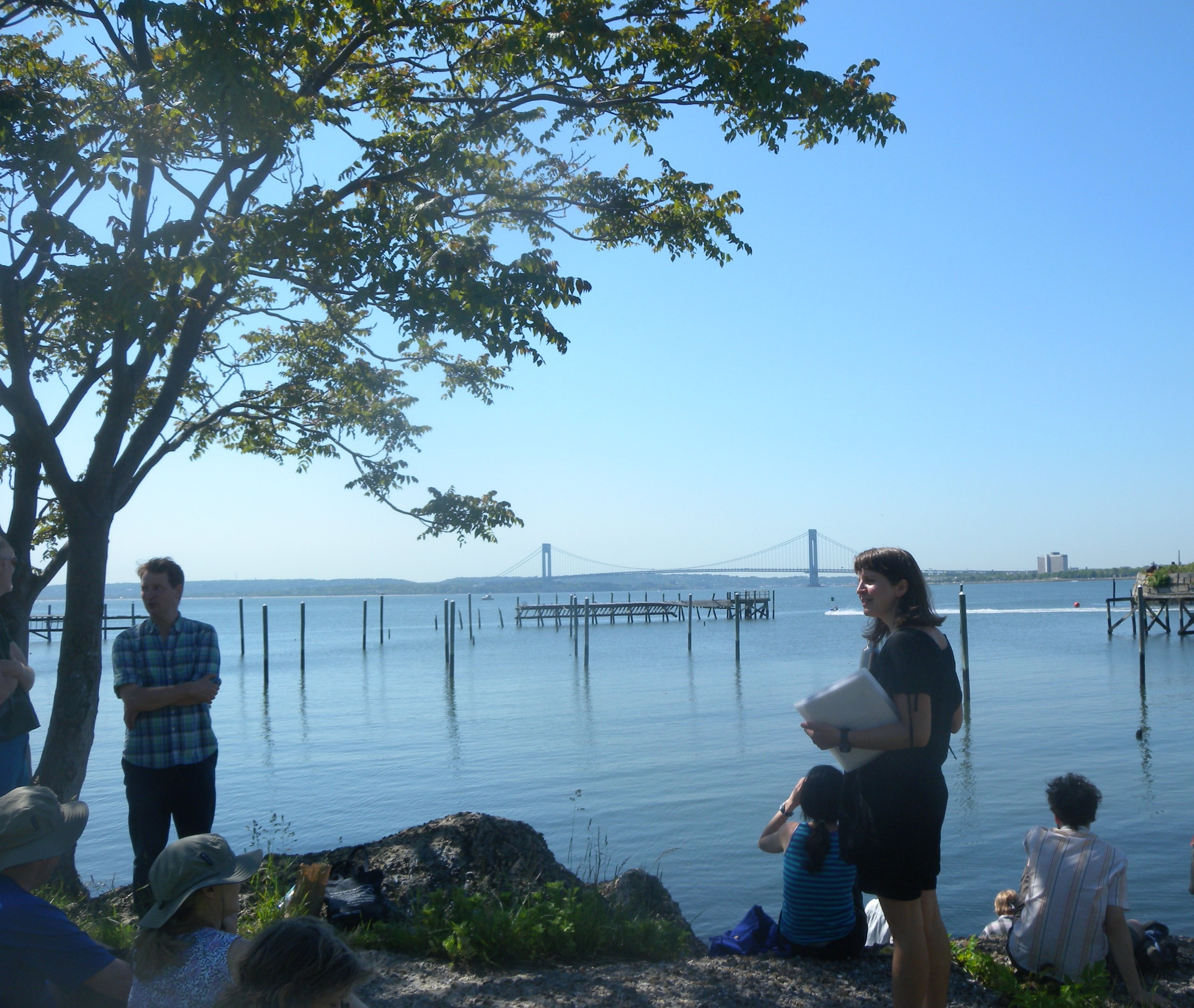
Gravesend Bay as viewed from the shoreline in Gravesend, Brooklyn. The Verrazzano–Narrows Bridge is viewable in the background.

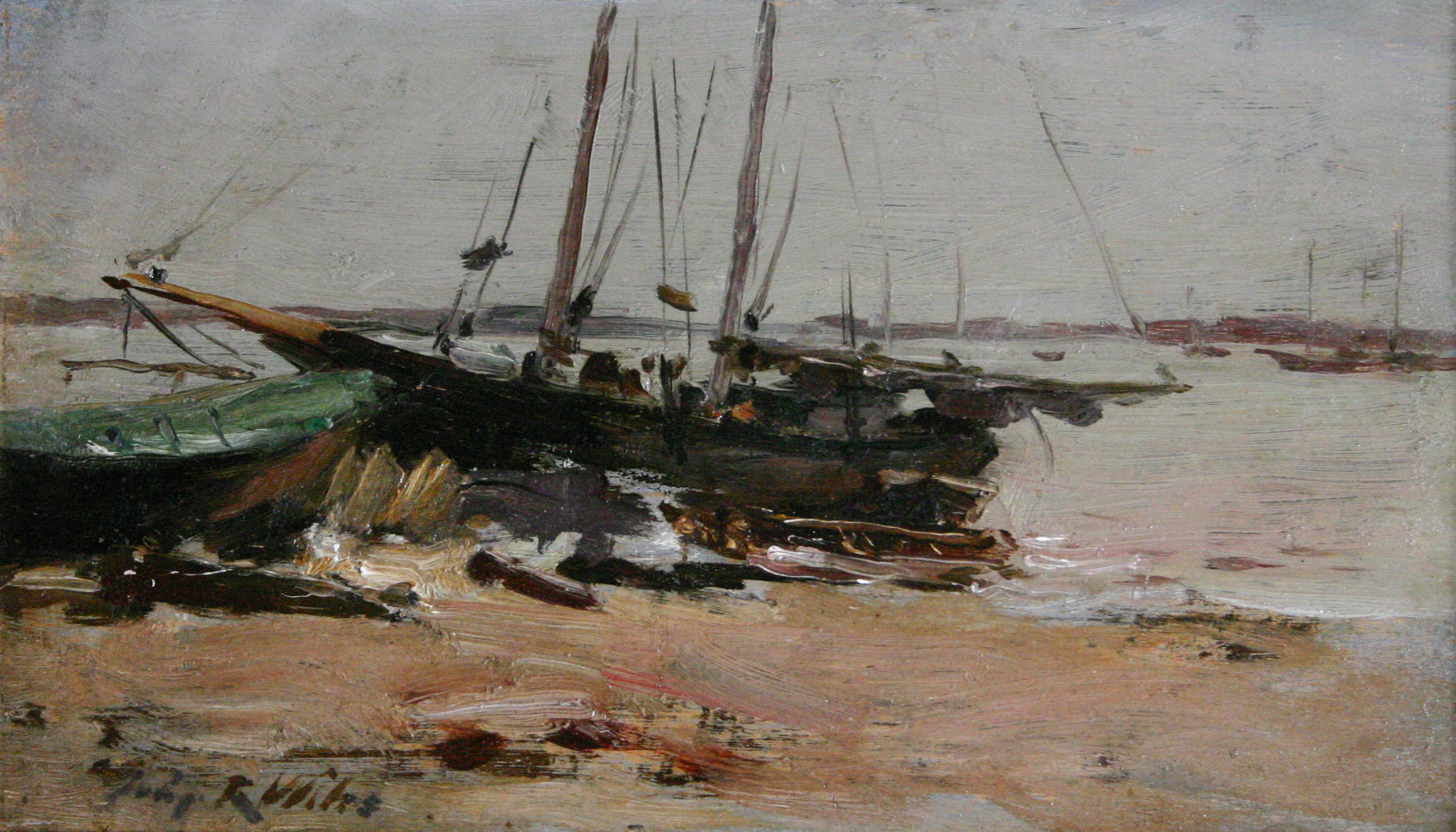
Gravesend Bay, an oil painting by Irving Ramsey Wiles.

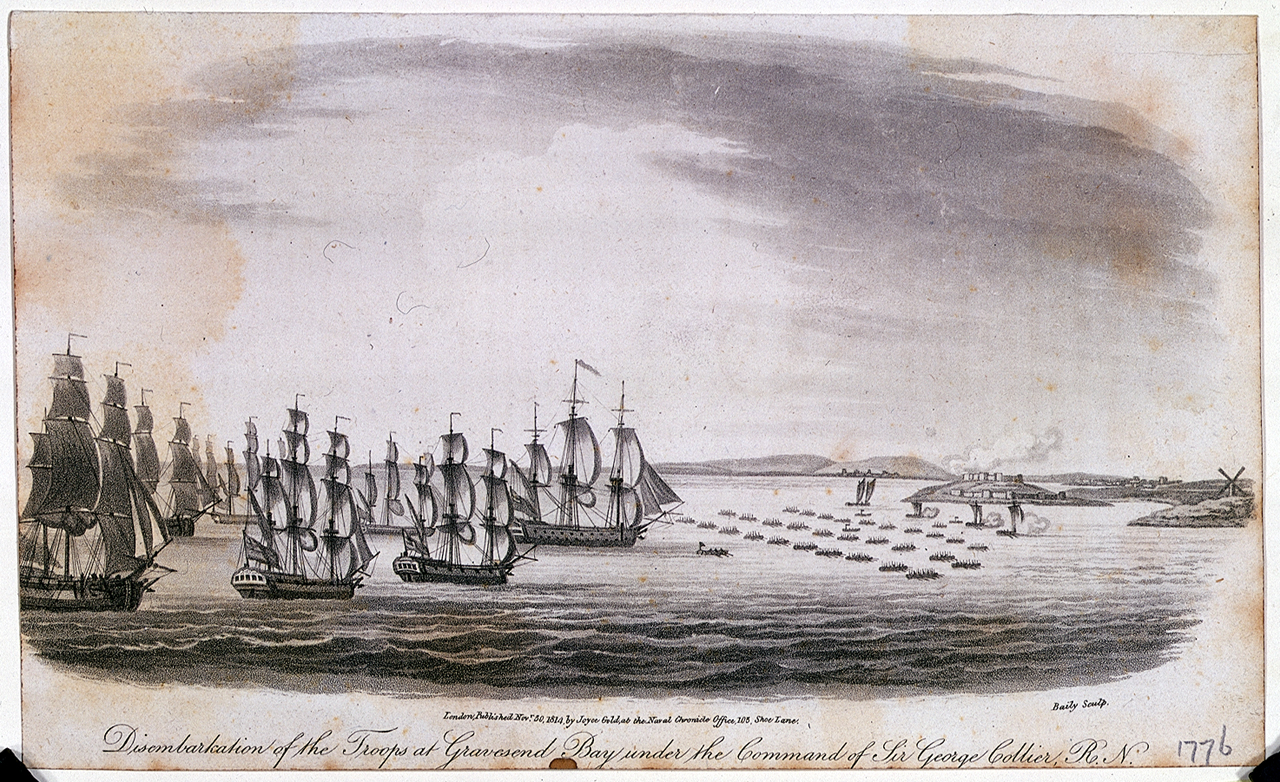
1814 etching, Disembarkation of the Troops at Gravesend Bay under the Command of Sir George Collier, R.N, aquatint.

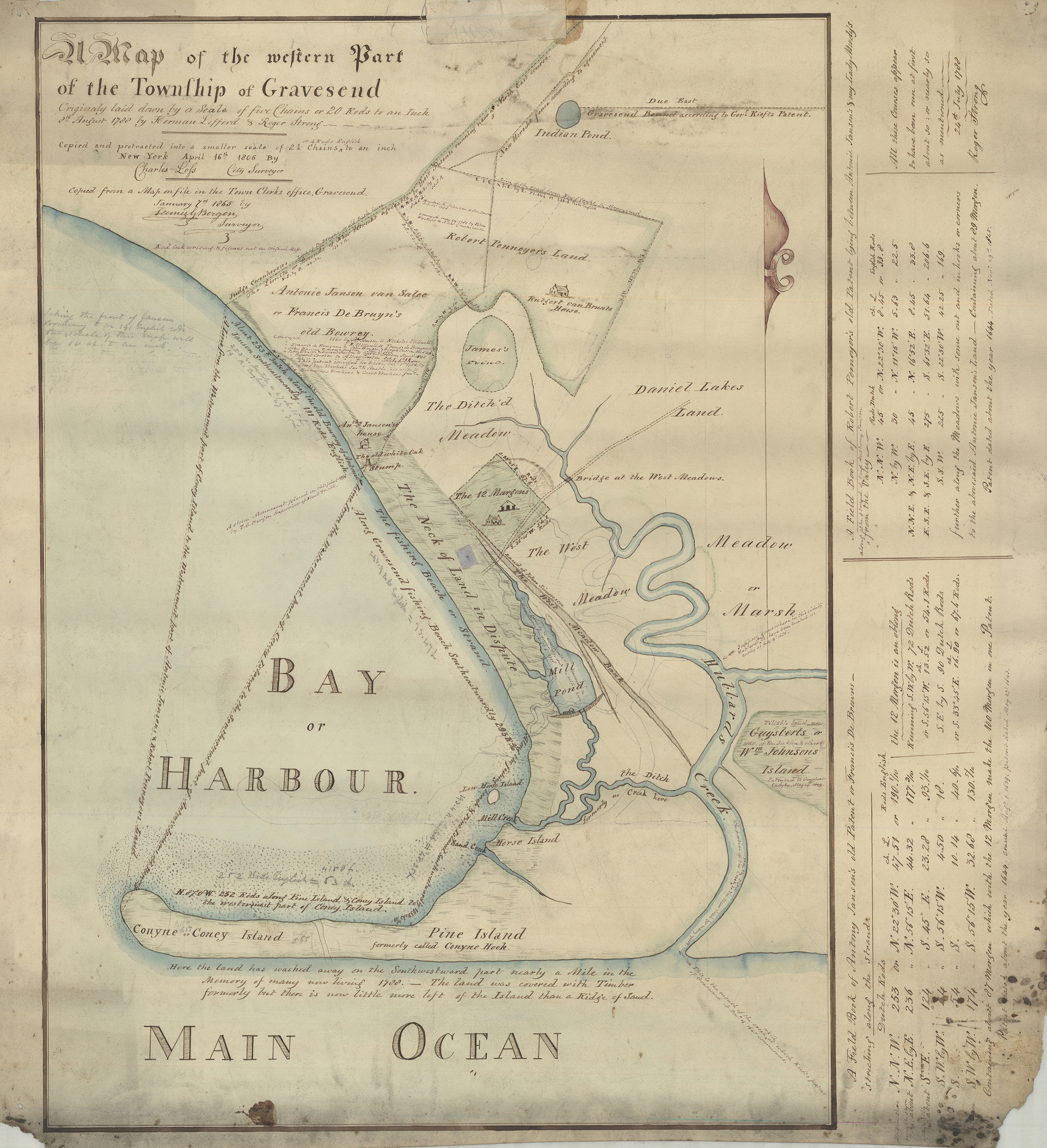
Gravesend Bay in 1788.
