= Bath Beach, Brooklyn =

Neighborhood in New York City

Bath Beach
- Neighborhood of Brooklyn
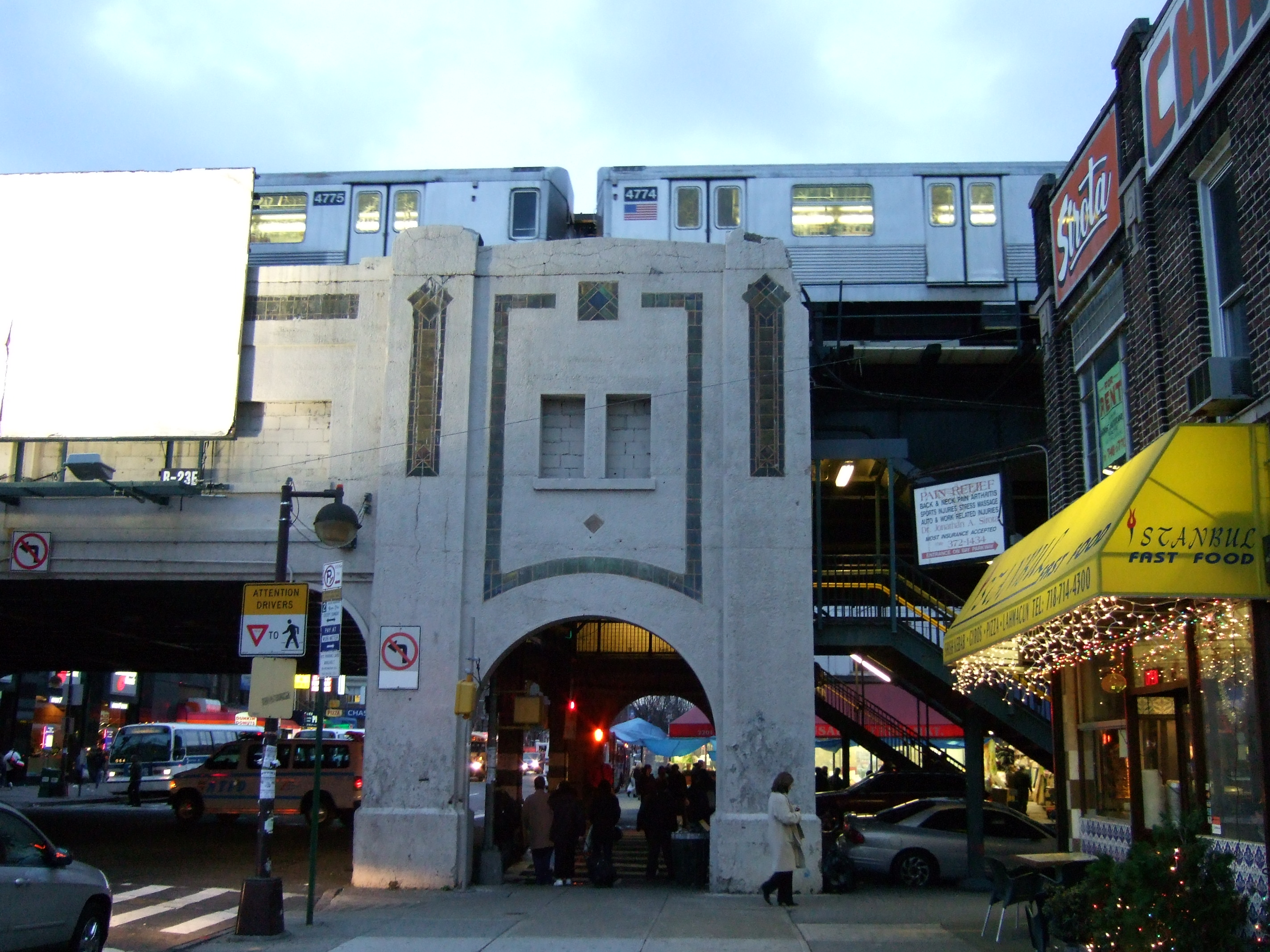
- The Bay Parkway subway station in Bath Beach
- Etymology: The Bath spa in Bath, Somerset
- Interactive map of Bath Beach
- Coordinates: 40.602°N 74.003°W
- Country: United States
- State: New York
- City: New York City
- Borough: Brooklyn
- Community District: Brooklyn 11

Population (2020)
  - Total: 33,070

Ethnicity
  - Asian: 41.0
  - White: 40.0
  - Hispanic: 14.2
  - Black: 1.3
  - Other: 0.6
- ZIP Code: 11214, 11228
- Area codes: 718, 347, 929, and 917

Bath Beach is a neighborhood in the New York City borough of Brooklyn, located at the southwestern edge of the borough on Gravesend Bay. The neighborhood borders Bensonhurst and New Utrecht to the northeast across 86th Street; Dyker Beach Park and Golf Course to the northwest across 14th Avenue; and Gravesend to the east across Stillwell Avenue.

== History ==
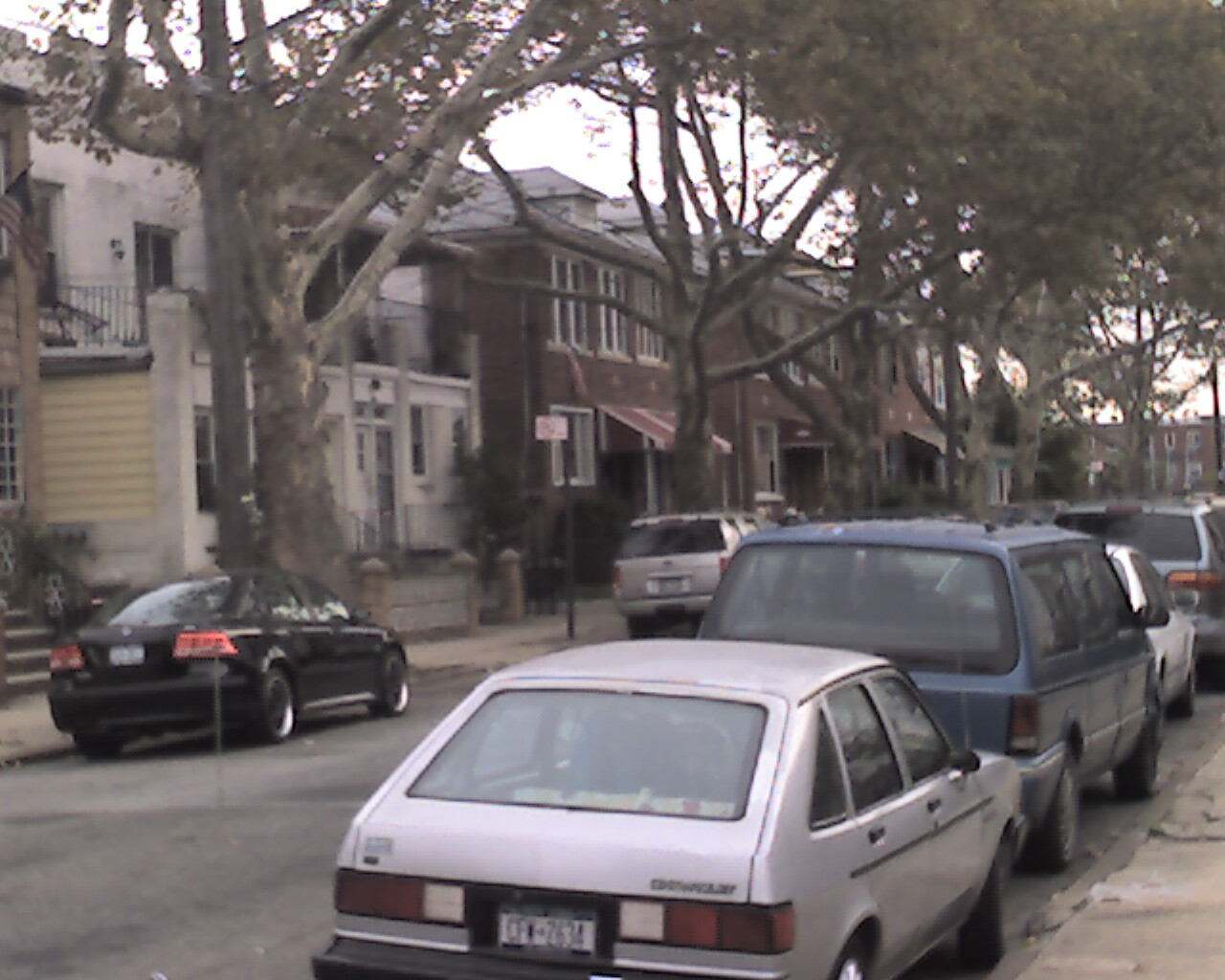
Bay 34th Street

Bath Beach held one of Brooklyn's earliest African-American settlements. Freed slaves were given a parcel of land to settle in the mid-nineteenth century. The church that was once located in the heart of that community, Mount Zion Baptist, left the neighborhood and relocated to Bedford-Stuyvesant.

The term "Bath Beach" once described the beach resort specifically as part of the community of Bath, New York. Bath and Bath Beach are now more or less synonymous. The population of Bath Beach received a boost at the end of 1863 when steam dummy railroad service connected the community to the City of Brooklyn horsecar system terminal at 25th Street and 5th Avenue in Sunset Park. Bath Beach, named for the English spa, Bath, Somerset, was developed as a recreational seaside retreat for affluent families. It was part of the original Brooklyn town of New Utrecht. Although Coney Island was nearby, Bath Beach also had its own amusement park.

Despite its name, the neighborhood no longer has an actual beach. The beach was paved over during the mid-twentieth century to create the Shore Parkway. On the northwestern half, a promenade was constructed to allow residents access to a sea wall. The southwestern half, filled in with land excavated from the construction of the Shore (Belt) Parkway in the early 1940s, extended Bensonhurst Park, between 21st Avenue and Bay Parkway from Cropsey Avenue with ballfields and, later, the Ceasar's Bay shopping center.

== Demographics ==
Bath Beach is primarily a working-class community of semi-attached houses and small apartment houses. In the early 1900s many Italian immigrants settled in Brooklyn, including the neighborhoods of Bath Beach, Bensonhurst, Dyker Heights, and Gravesend, resulting in the establishment and growth of a substantial Italian American community. Since the 1990s, many Asian, West Asian, Eastern European, Central American, and Middle Eastern immigrants have settled in Bath Beach and surrounding neighborhoods, contributing to a rise in ethnic diversity in Brooklyn. The neighborhood contains a variety of small mom-and-pop businesses intermixed with chain stores, most of which are located at the Ceasar's Bay Shopping Center at the terminus of Bay Parkway, as well as on 86th Street and Bath Ave.

Based on data from the 2020 United States Census, the population of Bath Beach was 33,070. Covering an area of 480.37 acres (194.40 ha), the neighborhood had a population density of 62.3 inhabitants per acre (39,900/sq mi; 15,400/km^{2}).

The racial makeup of the neighborhood was 41% (13,543) Asian American, 40% (13,227) White, 1.3% (443) African American 0.6% (187) from other races, and 2.9% (975) from two or more races. Hispanic or Latino of any race were 14.2% (4,695) of the population.

== Street grid ==
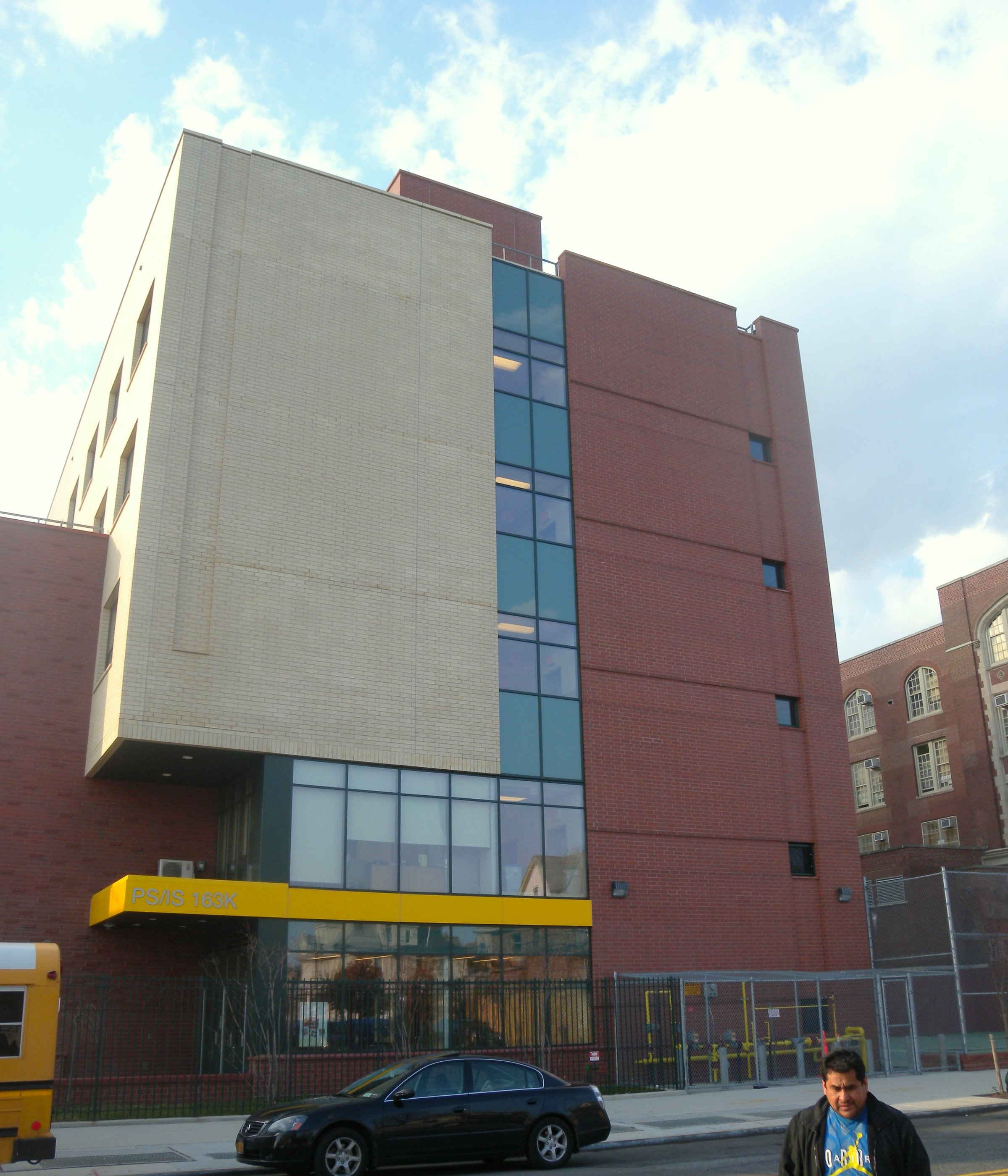
PS 163, the Bath Beach School

Streets of the neighborhood have a unique nomenclature. Four two-way thoroughfares traverse the neighborhood, running southeast/northwest, parallel to Shore Parkway: these are Cropsey Avenue, Bath Avenue, Benson Avenue, and 86th Street. Another, Harway Avenue, runs from Stillwell only as far as 24th Avenue. The one-way northeast/southwest cross-streets are numbered, with the word "Bay" attached (to distinguish them from other numbering systems elsewhere in the borough), from Bay 7th Street in the northwest through Bay 54th Street in the southeast. Every third "Bay" numbered street is replaced with a two-way numbered avenue, from 14th Avenue in the northwest to 28th Avenue in the southeast (except for what would be 22nd Avenue, which is called Bay Parkway). These avenues (as well as 86th Street) are part of the larger grid of avenues and streets encompassing other neighborhoods to the north and west, in the former Towns of Gravesend, New Utrecht, and Brooklyn. Belt Parkway runs on the shorefront north of Bay Parkway and is close to the shorefront south of Bay Parkway.

== Parks ==
Parks in Bath Beach include Bensonhurst Park located at the intersection of Cropsey Ave. and Bay Parkway, the Shore Parkway bike path/promenade west of the Belt Parkway, Bath Playground, Calvert Vaux Park, Scarangella Playground, and Anthony Catanzaro Square.

== Transportation ==
Bath Beach is served by the D, R, and W services of the New York City Subway system, along the BMT West End Line. Stations along the line serving the community are 18th Avenue, 20th Avenue, Bay Parkway, 25th Avenue, and Bay 50th Street. MTA Regional Bus Operations routes serving Bath Beach include the B1, B3, B6, B8, B64, B82 and B82 SBS in addition to the X28 and X38. express routes.

== Library ==
The Brooklyn Public Library's Ulmer Park branch is located at 2602 Bath Avenue near 26th Avenue. It was founded as a subdivision of another library in 1951 before becoming a full-fledged circulation branch in 1956. The current building was opened in 1963 and was renovated in 2016.

== In popular culture ==
During the 1970s, Bath Beach's commercial strip along 86th Street was used for scenes in the 1971 feature film The French Connection, in the opening credits to the popular television series Welcome Back, Kotter, and most famously in the opening scene of the 1977 feature film Saturday Night Fever. Tony Manero, the lead character (played by John Travolta), walks along the sidewalk, admires shoes in a storefront window, buys two (stacked) slices of pizza through a pizzeria window-counter at Lenny's Pizza, and ends up at the hardware store where he works (based on a real hardware store on Fifth Avenue in nearby Bay Ridge). The strip was used again in 2016 for the filming of Red Hot Chili Peppers - Go Robot music video. The film John Wick: Chapter 3 – Parabellum features the main character on horseback along 86th Street.

== Notable people ==
Notable current and former residents of Bath Beach include:

- Vincent Favale (born 1959), entertainment industry professional and co-founder of Comedy Central
