= Coney Island Beautification Project =

American civic organization

Coney Island Beautification Project is an environmentally focused civic organization formed after Hurricane Sandy to involve the Coney Island community in the repair and enhancement of the local environment. Focused on Coney Island and surrounding areas, the Coney Island Beautification Project engages the community through community gardening and maintenance of parks, street tree beds, and other public green spaces. Pamela Pettyjohn, a retired New York City Subway operator, co-founded and is president of the organization.
