= Calvert Vaux Park =

Public park in Brooklyn, New York

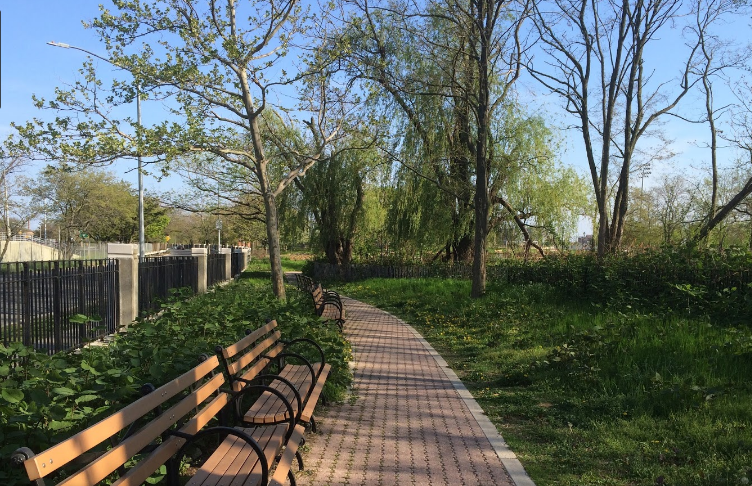
- Interactive map of Calvert Vaux Park
- Location: Gravesend, Brooklyn, New York, US
- Coordinates: 40°35′06″N 73°59′40″W
- Area: 85.53 acres (34.61 ha)
- Created: 1933
- Operator: New York City Department of Parks and Recreation
- Open: 6 a.m. to 1 a.m.
- Status: open

Calvert Vaux Park (formerly known as Dreier Offerman Park) is an 85.53-acre (34.61 ha) public park in Gravesend, Brooklyn, in New York City. Created in 1934, it is composed of several disconnected sections along the Belt Parkway between Bay 44th and Bay 49th Streets. The peninsula upon which the park is located faces southwest into Gravesend Bay, immediately north of the Coney Island Creek. The park was expanded in the 1960s by waste from the construction of the Verrazzano–Narrows Bridge, and was renamed after architect Calvert Vaux in 1998. It is operated by the New York City Department of Parks and Recreation, also known as NYC Parks.

== Description ==
The park is located in the Bath Beach section (zip code 11214) where the Coney Island Creek deposits into Gravesend Bay. It is named for landscape architect Calvert Vaux, known for designing Central Park and Prospect Park with Frederick Law Olmsted. Vaux was last seen alive in another area of Bath Beach in 1895 and was later found dead in Gravesend Bay.

There is a playground northeast of the Belt Parkway, bounded by the parkway's service road, 27TH Ave. and 46th Streets, and Cropsey Avenue. The playground was the original portion of Dreier Offerman Park to open. It contains a play structure, two bocce courts, two handball courts, and two basketball courts.

Across Belt Parkway is the main portion of the park, consisting of a peninsula and a smaller shoreline section called Six Diamonds, which are separated by a small inlet called Calvert Vaux Cove. The peninsula, located just south of Adventurers Amusement Park (formerly Nellie Bly Park), contains three baseball diamonds and six soccer fields. A bike path runs along the peninsula and is part of the Brooklyn Waterfront Greenway. The Six Diamonds section contains another six baseball diamonds, as well as two football fields, which overlap with the diamonds. The Coney Island Creek is adjacent to the peninsula and the Six Diamonds sections, and contains a boat graveyard with over two dozen ships, many dating from the park's expansion in the 1960s.

== History ==
=== Early years ===
The site of Calvert Vaux Park was envisioned as a harbor within Gravesend Bay. The park originally consisted of the small playground on Cropsey Avenue. It was named after the Dreier Offerman Home for Unwed Mothers, which donated some land to New York City's government upon its closure in 1933. The families of Theodor Dreier and Henry Offerman contributed $20,000 toward the park's construction. As early as 1932, The New York Times mentioned that the parkland had already been set aside, and that some additional land was being proposed to "round out" the park area. At the Dreier Offerman Playground's opening on November 9, 1934, New York City mayor Fiorello H. La Guardia mentioned that it had taken five years to acquire the land, but that New York City parks commissioner Robert Moses had advocated for the project to start within five months of the acquisition.

Dreier Offerman Park was first expanded in 1944. Another expansion was funded by a New York state bond act passed in 1960. In order to meet a requirement that at least 25 acres (10 ha) of land be purchased for each park funded by the bond act, the city planned a large park in each of its five boroughs. As a result, the city approved a 72-acre (29 ha) expansion of the Dreier Offerman Park between Bay 44th and Bay 49th Streets, to be created with landfill from the construction of the Verrazzano–Narrows Bridge, bringing the park area to 73 acres (30 ha). Previously, much of the land had been underwater.

The dumping permit expired in 1972, and a group of six architecture students at the City College of New York were hired to redesign the park. At the time, illegal dumping activity was still ongoing, and abandoned vehicles cohabited the space with wildflowers. These plans were never fully built out because of a lack of money. Part of the landfill site was sold in 1984 to a private developer. By the 1990s, the park contained weeds, broken electronics, and other garbage. Parks commissioner Henry Stern said in 1997 that "The park just lay there as the garbage settled for 35 years."

=== Redevelopment ===
In 1990, NYC Parks proposed building a boat launch, amphitheater, and natural wetland education area in the park. A fire in 1994 damaged a storage trailer that was used by the Narrows-Verrazano Youth program. At the time, the New York Daily News reported that Dreier Offerman Park had three baseball fields and two soccer fields, and 1,000 people a week were using the park's facilities. By 1997, the Times reported that there were five soccer fields, and the site was a popular spot for fishing. Teams were required to maintain fields in order to have the opportunity to lock them up. A cleanup project was conducted under NYC Park's 5x5 program in 1995.

In 1997, plans were announced for a 40-acre (16 ha) golfing facility in the park, which would include a driving range with 80 stalls, a miniature golf course with 18 holes, a golf shop, concession, a roller rink, and batting cages. The other 33 acres (13 ha) would be re-landscaped into new baseball and soccer fields. The golf facility was to be operated by Family Golf Centers, a company based in Melville, New York. It would be one of two planned golf courses in New York City, the other being Ferry Point Park in the Bronx. The project faced opposition because it was seen as an unwarranted privatization of public parkland, and many neighborhood residents saw the plan as "ill-conceived".

The park was renamed after Calvert Vaux in 1998. The playground was renovated for $2 million in November 2000, with new courts, play areas, a comfort station, and lawns. NYC Parks announced a $40 million restoration of the park in 2007, as part of mayor Michael Bloomberg's program to make sure all New York City residents were within a 10-minute walk of a park. The project, to be completed by 2011, called for three baseball fields, six soccer fields, picnic areas, a lawn, an amphitheater, and a bike path. The first two new turf soccer fields were completed in 2008. A 3.5-acre (1.4 ha) waterfront habitat for water birds was completed in 2013. NYC Parks revealed further renovation plans in 2019, and New York City Council members Justin Brannan and Mark Treyger advocated for the allocation of $80 million toward such renovations.

== Incidents ==
In 2006, a small plane bound for New Jersey's Linden Airport made an emergency landing in the park after its engine failed.

In 2013, a 19-year-old man was killed while flying his motorized helicopter in the park, after it struck him in the head.
