= List of Brooklyn thoroughfares =

This article provides a listing (with simple descriptions, where possible) of the streets in the New York City borough of Brooklyn, including Fort Hamilton, the last active-duty military post in New York City.

== State-named roadways ==
Name	From	To	Distance	# of lanes	Traffic direction	Additional notes
Alabama Avenue	Fulton Street	Flatlands Avenue	1.9 mi	1	South	Exists in 3 segments.
Arkansas Drive	Indiana Place	Bassett Avenue	0.23 mi	2	Southwest-Northeast	Mill Basin
Georgia Avenue	Fulton Street	Flatlands Avenue	1.9 mi	1	North	
Indiana Place	National Drive	Mayfair Drive South	0.15 mi	2	North-South	Mill Basin
Kansas Place	National Drive	Arkansas Drive	0.06 mi	2	North-South	Mill Basin
Louisiana Avenue	Williams Avenue	Seaview Avenue	1.5 mi	1-2	Varies	Split into 2 segments by Linden Boulevard.
Montana Place	National Drive	Arkansas Drive	0.07 mi	2	North-South	Mill Basin
New Jersey Avenue	Jamaica Avenue	Flatlands Avenue	1.9 mi	1	Varies	Exists in 3 vehicular segments (two pedestrian segments).
New York Avenue	Fulton Street	Kings Highway	4.4 mi	2-3	Varies	Exists in 2 segments.
Pennsylvania Avenue	Jackie Robinson Parkway/Jamaica-East New York-Bushwick Avenues triangle	Belt Parkway	2.8 mi	4-7	North-south	
Vermont Place	Cypress Avenue	Highland Boulevard	0.5 mi	2	North-south	
Vermont Street	Jamaica Avenue	Flatlands Avenue	2.3 mi	1	South	
Washington Avenue	Flushing Avenue	Flatbush Avenue	2.6 mi	2-4	North-south	
Washington Street	Dead-end	Prospect Street	0.25 mile	1	South	Continues as Cadman Plaza East.

== Avenues ==
Name	From	To	Distance	# of lanes	Traffic direction	Additional notes
Albany Avenue	Decatur Street	Avenue K	3.5 miles	2	South	
Allen Avenue	Knapp Street	Gerritsen Avenue	0.23 miles	1	East	Gerritsen Beach
Arlington Avenue						
Atkins Avenue						
Atlantic Avenue	Brooklyn-Queens Expressway	Van Wyck Expressway in Queens	10.3 miles	6	Bidirectional	
Autumn Avenue						
Banner Avenue						Brighton Beach
Bassett Avenue						
Bath Avenue	14th Avenue	Stillwell Avenue	2.11 miles	2	Bidirectional	Bath Beach
Battery Avenue	Fort Hamilton Army Base	86th Street	1 mile	1	North	Dyker Heights
Bay Avenue						
Bay Ridge Avenue	Shore Road	Bay Pkwy	3.1 miles	1-2	East/West	Bay Ridge
Bayview Avenue						Coney Island/Seagate
Bedford Avenue	Manhattan Avenue	Emmons Avenue	10.2 miles	2	North/South	Sheepshead Bay
Belmont Avenue						
Benson Avenue						
Bergen Avenue						
Bijou Avenue	Ebony Court	Gerritsen Avenue	0.15	2	Southwest/Northeast	Gerritsen Beach
Blake Avenue						
Brighton Beach Avenue						Brighton Beach
Brooklyn Avenue						
Buffalo Avenue						
Bushwick Avenue						
Canal Avenue						Coney Island
Canda Avenue						Sheepshead Bay
Carlton Avenue						
Caton Avenue						
Central Avenue						
Channel Avenue	Ebony Court	Gerritsen Avenue	0.15 miles	2	Southwest/Northeast	
Chauncey Avenue						
Chestnut Avenue						
Christopher Avenue						
Church Avenue						
Clarkson Avenue						
Classon Avenue						
Clermont Avenue						
Clinton Avenue						
Coney Island Avenue	Machate Circle	Riegelmann Boardwalk				
Conklin Avenue						
Crawford Avenue						
Crescent Avenue						
Crooke Avenue						
Cropsey Avenue						
Crosby Avenue						
Cypress Avenue						
Cyrus Avenue						Gerritsen Beach
Debevoise Avenue						
DeKalb Avenue						Runs briefly into Ridgewood, New York in Queens County. Ridgewood was once part of Bushwick, Brooklyn, but seceded and became part of Queens, adjacent to the existing area of Glendale, Queens. Ridgewood and Glendale have the same zip code (11385).
Devon Avenue	Joval Court	Gerritsen Avenue	0.26 miles	2	Southwest/Northeast	
Dewitt Avenue						
Ditmas Avenue						
Division Avenue						
Dock Avenue						Brooklyn Navy Yard
Driggs Avenue						
Dumont Avenue						
East New York Avenue						
Elm Avenue						
Elmwood Avenue						
Emmons Avenue						Sheepshead Bay
Engert Avenue						
Everett Avenue						
Evergreen Avenue						
Fillmore Avenue						
Flatbush Avenue	Manhattan Bridge	Marine Parkway/Gil Hodges Memorial Bridge	9.9 miles	4	Bidirectional	
Flatlands Avenue						
Florence Avenue						Gerritsen Beach
Flushing Avenue	Navy Street	Queens line				
Foster Avenue						
Fountain Avenue						
Front Avenue						
Gates Avenue						
Gee Avenue						
Gelston Avenue	86th Street	94th Street	.4 mile	1	South	
Gerritsen Avenue	Nostrand Avenue	Lois Avenue	2.05 miles	2	Northwest/Southeast	
Glenmore Avenue						
Gotham Avenue	Fane Court	Gerritsen Avenue	0.31 miles	2	Southwest/Northeast	
Graham Avenue						Part of which is known as the "Avenue of Puerto Rico"
Grand Avenue						
Grant Avenue						
Greene Avenue						
Greenpoint Avenue	Dead-end (Brooklyn)	Roosevelt Avenue and Queens Boulevard (Queens)	2.5 miles	2-4	Bidirectional	Runs from Greenpoint, Brooklyn to Sunnyside, Queens and crosses Newtown Creek over the J.J. Byrne Bridge. Continues as Roosevelt Avenue past Queens Boulevard.
Greenwood Avenue	Prospect Park Southwest	McDonald Avenue	0.4 mile	2	Bidirectional	This avenue exists in two segments. They are separated by the open-cut Prospect Expressway. In theory, the avenue is connected, but this is achieved by a pedestrian overpass.
Guider Avenue						Sometimes misspelled as "Guilder Avenue"
Hale Avenue						
Hamilton Avenue						
Hampton Avenue						Manhattan Beach
Harkness Avenue						
Harrison Avenue						
Harway Avenue						
Hegeman Avenue						
Highland Avenue						
Highlawn Avenue						
Hitchings Avenue						Sheepshead Bay
Homecrest Avenue						
Howard Avenue						
Hudson Avenue						DUMBO
Hunter Avenue						
Independence Avenue						
Irving Avenue						
Jamaica Avenue						
Jefferson Avenue						
Jerome Avenue						
Johnson Avenue						
Kay Avenue						Williamsburg
Kent Avenue						
Kingsland Avenue						
Knickerbocker Avenue						
Lafayette Avenue						
Lake Avenue						
Lancaster Avenue						
Laurel Avenue						Sea Gate
Lawrence Avenue						
Lee Avenue						
Lefferts Avenue						
Lewis Avenue						
Lexington Avenue						
Liberty Avenue						
Lincoln Avenue						
Linden Avenue						
Livonia Avenue						
Lois Avenue	Hyman Court	Gerritsen Avenue	0.2 miles	2	Southwest/Northeast	Gerritsen Beach
Loring Avenue						
Lott Avenue						
Madoc Avenue	Cyrus Avenue	Post Court	0.15 miles	2	Northwest/Southeast	Gerritsen Beach
Manhattan Avenue	Former Vernon Avenue Bridge	Broadway	3.4 miles	1-2	North/South	Greenpoint & Williamsburg
Maple Avenue						Sea Gate
Marcy Avenue	Metropolitan Avenue	Fulton Street	2.6 miles	2	South	Frontage road for Brooklyn-Queens Expressway for its northernmost 0.6 miles.
Marine Avenue	92nd Street	Fort Hamilton Parkway	0.66 mile	2	Bidirectional	Continuation of Colonial Road. Carries a northbound on-street bike lane running from 92nd Street to Oliver Street.
Maspeth Avenue						
McDonald Avenue						
McDonough Avenue						Brooklyn Navy Yard
Meeker Avenue	Gardner Avenue	Metropolitan Avenue	1.5 mile	2-4	Bidirectional	Is a frontage road for the Brooklyn-Queens Expressway for most of its length.
Mermaid Avenue	Surf Avenue	Stillwell Avenue	1.25 miles	2	Bidirectional	Site of the Mermaid Parade in Coney Island.
Metropolitan Avenue	East River	Queens line				Williamsburg
Miller Avenue						
Morris Avenue						
Montauk Avenue						
Montrose Avenue						
Myrtle Avenue						
Narrows Avenue	68th Street	Shore Road	1.10 miles	2	Bidirectional	Path impeded between 83rd and 85th streets by Fort Hamilton High School.
Nassau Avenue						
Nautilus Avenue						
Neptune Avenue	Surf Avenue	Shore Boulevard & Emmons Avenue	2.96 miles	2-4	Bidirectional; bike lanes run along most of its length.	Coney Island and Sheepshead Bay
Newkirk Avenue						
New Lots Avenue						
New Utrecht Avenue						
New York Avenue						
Noel Avenue	Bartlett Place	Lois Avenue	0.34 miles	1-2	Southeast/Northwest	Gerritsen Beach
Norman Avenue						
North Conduit Avenue						
North Portland Avenue						
Norwood Avenue						
Nostrand Avenue						
Ocean Avenue						
Oceanic Ave						Sea Gate
Oceanview (or Ocean View) Avenue						
Onderdonk Avenue						
Ordnance Avenue						Brooklyn Navy Yard
Ovington Avenue						
Paidge Avenue						
Park Avenue						
Parkside Avenue						
Parkville Avenue						
Pennsylvania Avenue						
Perry Avenue						Kingsborough Community College
Pitkin Avenue						
Poplar Avenue						Sea Gate
Prospect Avenue	Ocean Parkway	4th Avenue	1.59 miles	2	Varies	Two-way from Ocean Parkway to 6th Avenue and one-way westbound to its terminus at 4th Avenue.
Putnam Avenue						
Railroad Avenue						
Ralph Avenue						
Remsen Avenue						
Ridgewood Avenue						
Riverdale Avenue						
Roder Avenue						
Rogers Avenue						
Ryder Avenue						
Saratoga Avenue						
Sea Breeze Avenue	West 5th Street	Beach Walk	0.3 mile	2	Bidirectional	
Sea Gate Avenue						Sea Gate
Seaview Avenue						
Seawall Avenue						Kingsborough Community College
Seba Avenue	Madoc Avenue	Gerritsen Avenue	0.31 miles	2	Southwest/Northeast	Gerritsen Beach
Schenectady Avenue						
Schenk Avenue						
Schroeders Avenue						Starrett City
Scott Avenue						
Seneca Avenue						
Sheffield Avenue						
Sheridan Avenue						
Ship Ways Avenue						Brooklyn Navy Yard
Skillman Avenue						
Snediker Avenue						
Snyder Avenue						
South Portland Avenue						
St Felix Avenue						
St Marks Avenue						
St Nicholas Avenue						
Starr Avenue						
Stewart Avenue						
Stillwell Avenue	Bay Parkway	Riegelmann Boardwalk				
Strickland Avenue						
Stuyvesant Avenue						
Sunnyside Avenue						
Surf Avenue	Poplar Avenue & Highland Avenue (Sea Gate)	Ocean Parkway & Sea Breeze Avenue	2.61 miles	2-6	Bidirectional	Continuation of Poplar Avenue and Ocean Parkway.
Sutter Avenue						
Thatford Avenue						
Throop Avenue						
Tilden Avenue						
Tompkins Avenue						
Troy Avenue						
Underhill Avenue						
Union Avenue						
Utica Avenue						
Van Sinderen Avenue						
Vandalia Avenue						Starrett City
Vanderbilt Avenue						
Vandervoort Avenue						
Varick Avenue	Sometimes misidentified as Varick Street					Bushwick
Vernon Avenue						
Voorhies Avenue						
Warrington Avenue						Brooklyn Navy Yard
Washington Avenue						Prospect Heights and Clinton Hill
Waverly Avenue						
Webster Avenue						
West Brighton Avenue						
Westshore (or West Shore) Avenue						
Willoughby Avenue						
Wilson Avenue						
Woodruff Avenue						
Woodside Avenue						
Wyckoff Avenue						
Wythe Avenue						

=== Numbered Avenues ===
Apart from the portion of 3rd through 7th Avenues beyond 86th Street, the numbered avenues run approximately 40 degrees west of south, but by local custom are called North–south.

Avenue	North-end	South-end	Length	# of lanes	Traffic direction	Additional notes	Image
First Avenue	39th Street	58th Street		2	North–south	Rail tracks are embedded along the center of the avenue for most of its length. Renamed "Colonial Road" in Bay Ridge.	
Second Avenue	Dead-end north of 5th Street	64th Street		2	North–south	Exists in two sections; Fifth Street to Hamilton Avenue, and 28th to 64th streets. Renamed "Ridge Boulevard" in Bay Ridge.	
Third Avenue	Flatbush Avenue	Shore Road		2–10	North–south	Serves as service road for Gowanus Expressway between Prospect Avenue and 65th Street. Served by the B37 bus along the entire avenue and northbound B103 bus north of the Prospect Expressway (but only has one stop at State Street)	
Fourth Avenue	Flatbush Avenue	Shore Road		4–6	North–south	The BMT Fourth Avenue Line runs underneath.	
Fifth Avenue	Flatbush Avenue	4th Avenue		2	North–south	B63 runs the entire length of the avenue.	
Sixth Avenue	Atlantic Avenue	Fort Hamilton Parkway		1–2	Varies	Exists in three segments, separated by 36th–38th Street Yard and Sunset Park.	
Seventh Avenue	Flatbush Avenue	Cropsey Avenue		2–5	North–south	Exists in three segments. Serves as service road for Gowanus Expressway from 65th to 79th Streets. Has subway stations on the IND Culver Line and BMT Brighton Line. The B67 and B69 buses run on it between 20th Street and Flatbush Avenue. The avenue widens south of 65th Street.	
Eighth Avenue	Flatbush Avenue	73rd Street		2	Varies	Exists in two segments. B70 runs along the avenue from Bay Ridge Avenue to 39th Street. Has a station on the BMT Sea Beach Line	
Ninth Avenue	Flatbush Avenue	Bay Ridge Parkway		2–3	North–south	Exists in four segments. Has one station on the BMT West End Line	
10th Avenue	Prospect Park SW	86th Street		2	North–south	Exists in three segments.	
11th Avenue	Prospect Park SW	86th Street		2	North–south	Exists in two segments, separated by Green-Wood Cemetery and Fort Hamilton Parkway. Has an entrance to Fort Hamilton Parkway on the BMT Sea Beach Line	
12th Avenue	Dahill Road	86th Street		2	Varies	Exists in two segments.	
13th Avenue	36th Street	86th Street		2	North–south	B64 bus runs along the avenue from 86th Street to Bay Ridge Avenue. Bay Ridge-bound B16 buses run along the avenue from 37th Street to 57th Street.	
14th Avenue	McDonald Avenue	Cropsey Avenue		2	North–south	Prospect Park-bound B16 bus runs on the avenue from 56th to 36th Streets	
15th Avenue	McDonald Avenue	Shore Parkway		2	North–south		
16th Avenue	38th Street	Shore Parkway		2	North–south		
17th Avenue	Dahill Road	17th Court		2	North–south	Has an entrance to 18th Avenue on the BMT Sea Beach Line	
18th Avenue	Coney Island Avenue	Shore Parkway		3	North–south	The B8 runs along the entire Avenue; has subway stations on the BMT West End Line, BMT Sea Beach Line, and IND Culver Line; merges with Ditmas Avenue east of Coney island Avenue	
19th Avenue	50th Street	Shore Parkway		2	North–south		
20th Avenue	McDonald Avenue	Shore Parkway		2	North–south	Has subway stations on the BMT West End Line and BMT Sea Beach Line	
21st Avenue	Dahill Road	Shore Parkway		2	North–south		
Bay Parkway (formerly 22nd Avenue)	Ocean Parkway	Caesar's Shopping Plaza		4	North–south	The B6 bus runs along most of the street, until Ave J. The B82 runs south of Kings Highway. Three subway stations on the BMT West End Line, BMT Sea Beach Line, and IND Culver Line.	
23rd Avenue	Stillwell Avenue	Cropsey Avenue		2	North–south		
23rd Avenue	59th Street	Dahill Road		2	North–south		
24th Avenue	Stillwell Avenue	Gravesend Bay		2	North–south	Split into two sections by the Belt Parkway	
24th Avenue	60th Street	McDonald Ave		2	North–south		
25th Avenue	Stillwell Avenue	Gravesend Bay		2	North–south	Has a station on the BMT West End Line and served by the B3 bus; Split into two sections by the Belt Parkway	
26th Avenue	Stillwell Avenue	Shore Parkway		2	North–south		
27th Avenue	Stillwell Avenue	Shore Parkway		2	North–south		
28th Avenue	Stillwell Avenue	Cropsey Avenue		2	North–south		
95th Avenue	Elderts Lane	Drew Street (continues into Queens)		1	East-west	This two-block long Queens-numbered avenue is divided by the border of Brooklyn and Queens, with the Brooklyn half on the southern side, but having Queens-style (73-xx and 74-xx) addresses.	
101st Avenue	Liberty Avenue/Forbell Street	Drew Street (continues into Queens)		2	West–east	This Queens-numbered avenue runs one block entirely in Brooklyn, with Brooklyn addresses.	

== Boulevards ==
Name	From	To	Distance	# of lanes	Traffic direction	Additional notes	Photo
Brooklyn Bridge Boulevard	Brooklyn Bridge	Fulton Street	0.84 mile	8	North to south	Co-named Adams Street	
Conduit Boulevard							
Empire Boulevard						Formerly called Malbone Street, renamed after the Malbone Street wreck.	
Highland Boulevard							East New York
John Berry Boulevard						Kingsborough Community College	Manhattan Beach
Linden Boulevard							
Malcolm X Boulevard						Formerly known as Reid Avenue	
Marcus Garvey Boulevard						Formerly known as Sumner Avenue	
McGuinness Boulevard	Pulaski Bridge/Dead-end	Humboldt Street	1.34 miles	4	North to south	Continues north as 11th Street in Queens after crossing the Pulaski Bridge; continues south as Humboldt Street.	
Mother Gaston Boulevard						Formerly known as Stone Avenue	
Oriental Boulevard							Manhattan Beach
Ridge Boulevard	65th Street	Shore Road	1.8 Miles	2	Bidirectional	Continuation of Second Avenue, above.	
Shore Boulevard							

== Courts ==
Name	From	To	Distance	# of lanes	Traffic direction	Additional notes
1st Court	Coney Island Avenue	East 9th Street	0.09	1	West	
Abbey Court						Gerritsen Beach
Agate Court						
Alice Court						
Applegate Court						
Aster Court						Gerritsen Beach
Atwater Court						
Barberry Court						
Beacon Court						Gerritsen Beach
Bennett Court (sometimes misspelled as Bennet Court)						
Bergen Court	East 72nd Street	Bergen Avenue		1	Northeast-Southwest (2 way)	Bergen Beach
Bevy Court						Gerritsen Beach
Blake Court						
Bokee Court						Gravesend
Bridge Plaza Court	Nassau Street	Concord Street	0.05	1	South	
Brighton Court						
Brightwater Court						Brighton Beach
Cameron Court	66th Street	67th Street	0.07 mile	1	North to south	
Canton Court						Gerritsen Beach
Cary Court	Dead ended private street along Coney Island Avenue					
Celeste Court						
Chester Court						
Cobek Court						
Colby Court						Gravesend
Corso Court						
Cypress Court						
Dahl Court						
Dank Court						Gravesend
Dare Court						Gerritsen Beach
Dekoven Court						
Desmond Court						
Dictum Court						Gerritsen Beach
Doone Court						
Dunne Court						
Duryea Court	66th Street	67th Street	0.07 mile	1		
Eaton Court						Gerritsen Beach
Ebony Court						Gerritsen Beach
Fane Court						
Frank Court						Gerritsen Beach
Gain Court						Gerritsen Beach
Garland Court	Allen Avenue (1st segment) Devon Avenue (2nd segment)	dead-end (1st segment), Florence Avenue (2nd segment)	0.26 miles (1st segment 0.04 miles, 2nd segment 0.22 miles)	1-2	Southeast	
Gerald Court	Coney Island Avenue	East 7th Street				Sheepshead Bay
Glendale Court						
Grace Court	Dead-end	Hicks Street	0.11 mile	1	West to east	
Gunnison Court						Sheepshead Bay
Hattie Jones Court						
Hazel Court						
Horace Court						
Hyman Court						Gerritsen Beach
Ira Court						Gerritsen Beach
Ivan Court						Gerritsen Beach
Jackson Court						
Jodie Court						
Joval Court						Gerritsen Beach
Just Court						
Kathleen Court (formerly Kathleen Place)	Coney Island Avenue	East 7th Street				Sheepshead Bay
Kay Court						Gerritsen Beach
Keen Court						Gerritsen Beach
Knight Court						
Lacon Court						
Lama Court						
Lamont Court						
Landis Court						Gerritsen Beach
Lawn Court						
Lester Court						Gerritsen Beach
Lloyd Court						
Manhattan Court						
Manor Court						
Matthews Court						
Melba Court						Gerritsen Beach
Merit Court						Gerritsen Beach
McKibbin Court						Williamsburg
Mesereau Court						
Montauk Court						
Murdock Court						Gravesend
Nixon Court						
Nova Court						Gerritsen Beach
Ocean Court						
Ovington Court	66th Street	67th Street	0.07 mile	1	North to south	
Parkway Court						
Preston Court						
Ridge Court						
Schenck Court						
Seaview Court	East 96 Street	Canarsie Road		1	East to west	
Spencer Court						
Southgate Court						
Stephens Court						
Stryker Court						
Sunset Court						
Temple Court						
Tennis Court						
Village Court						
Wallaston Court	66th Street	67th Street	0.07 mile	1	North to south	
Waldorf Court						
Walsh Court						
Wellington Court						
Westbury Court						

== Lanes ==
Name	From	To	Distance	# of lanes	Traffic direction
19th Lane					
20th Lane					
Ames Lane		No longer extant			Canarsie
Bedell Lane					
Canarsie Lane					Canarsie
Church Lane					Canarsie
Doubleday Lane					
Eldert (also called Elderts) Lane					
Harbor Lane	Harbor View Terrace	Dead-end	0.05 mile	1	West to east
Holmes Lane		No longer extant			Canarsie
Hoyt's Lane		No longer extant			Canarsie
Hunts Lane	Henry Street	Dead-end	0.08 mile	1	West to east
Love Lane	Hicks Street	Dead-end east of Henry Street	0.11 mile	1	East
Meadow Lane		No longer extant (also formerly known as Road To Lott's House)			Canarsie
Nolans Lane (or Nolan's Lane)					
Poole Lane		No longer extant			Sheepshead Bay
Red Hook Lane	Fulton Street	Boerum Place	0.08 mile	1	North
Savage Lane		No longer extant			Canarsie
School Lane					Franklin K. Lane High School
Shore Road Lane	Shore Road	Cul-de-Sac	0.05 mile	1	West to east
Skidmore Lane					Canarsie
Smiths (or Smith's) Lane					Canarsie
Tiemans (or Tieman's) Lane					Canarsie
Westerly Lane	Colonial Court	Dead-end	0.03 mile	1	West to east
Whitty Lane					East Flatbush

== Loops ==
Name	From	To	Distance	# of lanes	Traffic direction
Ardsley Loop					Contained within Starrett City
Bethel Loop					Contained within Starrett City
Croton Loop					Contained within Starrett City
Delmar Loop					Contained within Starrett City
Elmira Loop					Contained within Starrett City
Geneva Loop					Contained within Starrett City
Hornell Loop					Contained within Starrett City

== Parkways ==
Name	From	To	Distance	# of lanes	Traffic direction	Additional notes	Photo
Bay Ridge Parkway	Shore Road	Bay Parkway	3.1 miles	4	Bidirectional East/West		
Eastern Parkway	Prospect Park at Grand Army Plaza	Bushwick Avenue	3.9 miles	6-8	North to south	Continues as a dead-end street east of Bushwick Avenue. Known as "Eastern Parkway Extension" east of Broadway.	
Fort Hamilton Parkway	Ocean Parkway	101st Street	4.15 miles	2-4	North to south	Known as Fort Hamilton Avenue prior to 1892	
Marine Parkway	Nostrand Avenue	Fillmore Avenue	.6 miles	4	Northwest to Southeast		
Ocean Parkway	Prospect Park at Park Circle	Surf Avenue and Sea Breeze Avenue	5.37 miles	2-8	North to south	Continues as Surf Avenue once it reaches Coney Island.	
Rockaway Parkway							
Shore Parkway						Service road for Belt Parkway between exits 4 and 9B	

== Places ==
Name	From	To	Distance	# of lanes	Traffic direction	Additional notes
1st Place						Carroll Gardens
2nd Place						Carroll Gardens
3rd Place						Carroll Gardens
4th Place						Carroll Gardens
Aitken Place	Sidney Place	Clinton Street	0.06	1	East	
Amersfort Place						
Anchorage Place						
Arion Place						
Ashland Place						
Auburn Place						
Balfour Place						
Bancroft Place						
Bay Ridge Place	69th Street/Bay Ridge Avenue	Ovington Avenue	0.08 mile	1	South	
Bayview Place						
Beach Place					Pedestrian-only alley on East 88th Street and Stillwells Place, south of Avenue K and Canarsie Cemetery	
Bergen Place	Wakeman Place	67th Street	0.07 mile	1	South	
Berkeley Place						
Billings Place						
Boerum Place						
Borinquen Place						
Boynton Place						
Bulwer Place						
Bushwick Place						
Cass Place						
Cathedral Place	Jay Street	Flatbush Avenue Extension	0.11 mile	1	East	
Caton Place						
Cheever Place						
Claver Place						
Clifford Place						
Clifton Place						
Colin Place						
College Place	Dead-end	Love Lane	0.07	1	North to south	
Columbia Place	Joralemon Street	State Street	0.11 mile	1	South	
Columbus Place						
Corbin Place						Brighton Beach
Dahlgren Place	Fort Hill Place	86th Street	.4 mile	2	North	
Delmonico Place						
Dennet Place						
Denton Place						
Dewey Place						
Dinsmore Place						
Division Place						
Dunham Place						
Durland Place						
Elizabeth Place	Old Fulton Street	Doughty Street	0.04 mile	1	South	
Elm Place	Fulton Street	Livingston Street	0.07 mile	1	North	
Emerson Place						
Fairview Place						
Fanchon Place						
Farragut Place						
Fiske Place	Garfield Place	Carroll Street	0.08 mile	1	North-South (2 way)	
Fleet Place						
Friel Place						
Fort Greene Place						
Fort Hill Place	Battery Ave	Dahlgren Place	.05 mile	1	West	
Fuller Place						
Gallatin Place	Fulton Street	Livingston Street	0.07 mile	1	North	
Garden Place	Joralemon Street	State Street	0.12 mile	1	South	
Garfield Place	Prospect Park West	Fourth Avenue	0.71 mile	1	West	
Gatling Place	86th Street	92nd Street	.3 mile	2	South	
Grove Place	Hanover Place	Dead-end	0.05	1	West to east	
Gunther Place						
Hampton Place						
Hanover Place	Fulton Street	Livingston Street	0.07 mile	1	North	
Hanson Place						
Harrison Place						
Hart Place						
Havens Place						
Hillel Place						
Hinckley Place						
Howard Place						
Irvington Place						
Jackson Place						
Jardine Place						
Juliana Place						
Kane Place						
Kenilworth Place	Farragut Road	Hillel Place				
Kermit Place						
Kossuth Place						
Lake Place						
Lefferts Place						
Lewis Place						
Lincoln Place						
Lott Place						
Louis Place						
Ludlam Place						
MacKay Place						Bay Ridge
Madison Place						
Martin Luther King Jr. Place						
McKeever Place						
Micieli Place						
Miller Place						
Monaco Place						
Montgomery Place						
North Elliott Place						
O'Brien Place						Sometimes transcribed as O Brien Place or Obrien Place
Overbaugh Place						
Park Place						
Parrott Place						
Pierrepont Place	Pierrepont Street	Montague Street	0.05 mile	1	North	
Pleasant Place						
Polhemus Place	Garfield Place	Carroll Street	0.07 mile	1	North-South (2 way)	
Poly Place						Dyker Heights (street address of the elite Poly Prep Country Day School)
Prescott Place						
Prospect Place						
Radde Place						
Raleigh Place						
Red Cross Place	Cadman Plaza East	Adams Street	0.05	1	East	
Reeve Place						
Revere Place						
Ridgewood Place						
Robert Place						
Rockwell Place						
Roosevelt Place						
Royce Place	East 72nd Street	Bergen Avenue		1	Northeast-Southwest (2 way)	Bergen Beach
Rutherford Place						
Sedgwick Place	Wakeman Place	67th Street	0.07 mile	1	North	
Sherlock Place						
Sidney Place	Joralemon Street	State Street	0.13 mile	1	North	
Sloan Place						
South Elliott Place						
Spencer Place						
St Andrews Place						
St Charles Place						
St Francis Place						
St James Place						
St Johns Place						
St Marks Place						
St Pauls Place						
Sterling Place						
Stillwell (or Stillwells) Place						Canarsie
Stoddard Place						
Strong Place						
Sullivan Place						
Sumner Place						
Taaffe Place						
Tech Place	Adams Street	Jay Street	0.08	1	East	Renamed portion of Johnson Street
Terrace Place						
Tiffany Place						
Tompkins Place						
Turner Place						
Veronica Place						
Visitation Place						
Wakeman Place	Colonial Road	3rd Avenue	0.3 mile	1	East	
Warren Place						
Warsoff Place						
Webster Place						
Whitney Place						
Whitwell Place						
Williams Place						
Willow Place	Joralemon Street	State Street	0.11 mile	1	South	
Windsor Place						
Wolf Place						
Wythe Place						

== Roads ==
Name	From	To	Distance	# of lanes	Traffic direction	Additional notes	Photo
Albemarle Road	north	south					
Argyle Road	one-way						
Assembly Road	idek					Brooklyn Navy Yard	
Beverley Road	north-south						
Brooklyn Ave		north-south					
Buckingham Road		one-way					
Campus Road		one-way				Brooklyn College	
Clarendon Road	north-south						
Colonial Road	Wakeman Place	92nd Street	1.48 miles	2	North to south	Continuation of First Avenue, above.	
Cortelyou Road	Coney island ave and Flatbush Avenue.	north-south					
Coventry Road							
Cripplebush Road						No longer extant (now part of Wythe Avenue)	
Dahill Road (in four segments)	Caton Avenue	Kings Highway	4.8 miles (discounting interruptions)	2 for most of its length	North/South	Dahill Road was formerly called West Street, and still continues as West Street south of Avenue T (this continuation was not counting in the termini and length shown here). It serves as the dividing line between the East-numbered streets and West-numbered streets of southern Brooklyn, and forms the western border of the old town of Flatbush (which can be seen in its division of several street grids, especially along its northern portion).	
Dorchester Road							
Farragut Road							
Glenwood Road							
Gravesend Neck Road						Also known as just "Neck Road"	
Grimes Road							
Ivy Hill Road							
Lenox Road							
Lincoln Road							
Marlborough Road							
Old Mill Road							
Old New Utrecht Road							
Quentin Road							
Rugby Road							
Rutland Road							
Sheepshead Bay Road							
Shell Road							
Shore Road	68th Street	Fourth Avenue		2	North to south		
Stanton Road							
Stratford Road							
Varkens Hook Road (formerly Varkens Hook Lane)		No longer extant			Canarsie		
Village Road East/North/South							
Wallabout Road							
Welding Road							Steiner Studios
Westminster Road							
Woodpoint Road							

== Streets ==
=== Named streets ===
Name	From	To	Distance	# of lanes	Traffic direction	Additional notes	Photo
Adams Street	John Street	Fulton Street	0.84 mile	1-6	Varies	Cut-off at two points. One-lane one-way street in Dumbo; six-lane boulevard south of Brooklyn Bridge	
Adelphi Street							
Ainslie Street							
Amboy Street							Brownsville
Amherst Street							Manhattan Beach
Amity Street	Hicks Street	Court Street	0.3 mile	1	East		
Anthony Street							
Apollo Street							
Ashford Street							
Bainbridge Street							
Baltic Street							
Banker Street	Franklin Street	Nassau Avenue	0.36 mile	1	North		
Barbey Street							
Barnell Street							
Bartlett Street							
Batchelder Street							
Bayard Street							
Beadel Street							
Beard Street							
Beaumont Street							Manhattan Beach
Beaver Street							
Berry Street							
Bogart Street							
Bond Street							
Bowne Street							
Bradford Street							
Bragg Street							
Branton Street							
Bridge Street							
Bridgewater Street							
Brigham Street							
Bristol Street							
Brown Street							
Bryant Street							
Burnett Street							
Bush Street							
Butler Street							
Carroll Street							
Cedar Street							
Centre Street							
Chapel Street	Jay Street	Flatbush Avenue Extension	0.1 mile	1	East		
Chauncey Street							
Cherry Street							
Chester Street							
Chestnut Street							
Clara Street							
Clark Street	Columbia Heights	Cadman Plaza West					
Cleveland Street							
Clinton Street							
Clymer Street							
Coffey Street							
Coleman Street							
Coleridge Street							Manhattan Beach
Columbia Street	Atlantic Avenue	Dead-end at Columbia Street pier	1.88 miles	2	South	Cut-off by Brooklyn-Battery Tunnel	
Concord Street							
Conover Street							
Conselyea Street							
Conway Street							
Cook Street							
Cooper Street							
Cornelia Street							
Court Street	Montague Street	Dead-end	1.84 miles	1-4	Varies		
Covert Street							
Coyle Street							
Cranberry Street	Columbia Heights	Henry Street	0.18 mile	1	East		
Crescent Street							
Cross Street							
Crown Street							
Crystal Street							
Cumberland Street							
Cypress Hills Street							
Danforth Street							
Dean Street							
Debevoise Street							
Decatur Street							
Degraw Street							
Delavan Street							
Devoe Street							
Dikeman Street							
Ditmars Street							Bushwick
Dobbin Street							
Dock Street	Water Street	Front Street	0.05 mile	1	North	Continues as Old Dock Street.	
Dodworth Street							
Dooley Street							Sheepshead Bay
Dorset Street							
Doughty Street	Furman Street	Vine Street	0.13 mile	1	Varies		
Douglass Street							
Dover Street							Manhattan Beach
Downing Street							
Duffield Street							
Eckford Street							
Egan Street							
Eldert Street							
Ellery Street							
Elton Street							
Erasmus Street							
Erskine Street							Starrett City
Essex Street							
Etna Street							
Everit Street	Columbia Heights & Doughty Street	Old Fulton Street	0.03 mile	1	North	Continuation of Columbia Heights	
Exeter Street							Manhattan Beach
Falmouth Street							Manhattan Beach
Fayette Street							
Fenimore Street							
Ferris Street							
Fleet Street							
Floyd Street							
Ford Street							
Forrest Street							
Franklin Street	Commercial Street	Kent Avenue and North 14th Street	0.83 mile	2	South	Continues as Kent Avenue	
Front Street	Old Fulton Street	Hudson Avenue	0.64 mile	1-2	Varies		
Frost Street							
Furman Street	Old Fulton Street	Columbia Street	0.86 mile	1	South		
Fulton Street	Adams Street	Eldert Lane	6.72 miles	2	Varies		
Garden Street							
Garnet Street							
Gem Street							
George Street							
Gerry Street							
Girard Street							Manhattan Beach
Gold Street							
Grand Street							
Grattan Street							
Green Street							
Guernsey Street							
Hall Street							
Halleck Street							
Halsey Street							
Hancock Street							
Harden Street							
Haring Street							
Harman Street							
Hart Street							
Hastings Street							Manhattan Beach
Havemeyer Street							
Hawthorne Street							
Hemlock Street							
Hendrickson Street							
Hendrix Street							
Henry Street							
Herbert Street							
Herkimer Street							
Herzl Street						Named for Theodor Herzl	
Heyward Street							
Hewes Street							
Hicks Street	Fulton Street	Bay Street	2.04 miles	1-4	Varies	Cut-off at several points; Brooklyn-Queens Expressway and at the Red Hook Houses. Hicks Street serves as the service road for BQE between Congress Street and Hamilton Avenue.	
High Street							
Himrod Street							
Hinsdale Street							
Hooper Street							
Hope Street							
Hopkins Street							
Hoyt Street							
Hubbard Street							
Hull Street							
Humboldt Street							
Huntington Street							
Imlay Street							
Ingraham Street						Possibly named for Duncan Ingraham?	
Irwin Street							Manhattan Beach
Jackson Street							
Jaffrey Street							Manhattan Beach
Jay Street							
Jefferson Street							
Jerome Street							
Jewel Street							
John Street	Adams Street	Little Street	0.46 mile	1	West	Cut-off between Bridge and Gold streets.	
Johnson Street							
Joralemon Street							
Judge Street							
Junius Street							Brownsville
Kane Street							
Keap Street							
Kensington Street							Manhattan Beach
Kimball Street							
King Street							
Knapp Street							
Kosciuszko Street							
Lake Street							
Langham Street							Manhattan Beach
Lawrence Street							
Lawton Street							
Leonard Street							
Linwood Street							
Little Nassau Street							
Livingston Street							
Locust Street							
Logan Street							
Lombardy Street							
Lorimer Street							
Lorraine Street							
Lott Street							
Louisa Street							
Luquer Street							
Lynch Street							
MacDonough Street							
Mackenzie Street							Manhattan Beach
Macon Street							
Madison Street							
Main Street	Plymouth Street	Front Street	0.09 mile	1	North		
Maple Street							
Marginal Street East/West							
Marion Street							
Center, North and South Market Street							
Marshall Street	Gold Street	Plymouth and Little streets.	0.25 mile	1	Varies	Continues as Little Street.	
Martense Street							
Maujer Street							
McKibbin Street							
Meadow Street							
Melrose Street							
Meserole Street							
Middagh Street							
Middleton Street							
Midwood Street							
Milton Street							
Minna Street							
Moffat Street							
Monitor Street						Named after the USS Monitor built in Greenpoint.	
Monroe Street							
Montague Street							
Montgomery Street							
Montieth Street							
Moore Street							
Morton Street							
Nassau Street							
Navy Street							Brooklyn Navy Yard
Nelson Street							
Nevins Street							
New Dock Street	Ferry Landing	Water Street	0.09 mile	1	North to south		
Newel (or Newell) Street							
Newport Street							
Newton Street							
Noble Street							
Noll Street							
Norfolk Street							Manhattan Beach
Norman Street							
North Henry Street							
North Oxford Street							
Old Dock Street	Dead-end	Water Street	0.04 mile	1	Varies	Continues as Dock Street.	
Old Fulton Street							
Olive Street							
Oliver Street	Shore Road	Marine Avenue	0.13 mile	1	East		
Orange Street	Columbia Heights	Henry Street	0.18 mile	1	West		
Osborn Street							
Otsego Street							
Oxford Street							Manhattan Beach
Pacific Street							
Palmetto Street							
Park Street							
Paulding Street							
Pearl Street	Dead-end	Fulton Street	0.5 mile	1	Varies	Cut-off by MetroTech Center.	
Pembroke Street							Manhattan Beach
Pence Street							
Penn Street							
Pierrepont Street							
Pine Street							
Pineapple Street	Dead-end	Henry Street	0.21 mile	1	East		
Pioneer Street							
Plymouth Street	Main Street	Little Street	0.56 mile	1	East		
Polar Street							Seagate
Poplar Street	Willow Street	Henry Street	0.13 mile	1	East	Continuation of Willow Street.	
Powell Street							Brownsville
Powers Street							
President Street							
Prince Street							
Provost Street							
Pulaski Street							
Quincy Street							
Randolph Street							
Rapelye Street						This street is split up into two parts.	
Reed Street							
Rewe Street							Williamsburg
Richardson Street							
Rodney Street	Metropolitan Avenue	Kent Avenue	0.8 mile	1	North	The street is split up into three parts.	Williamsburg
Roebling Street							
Rose Street							
Ross Street							
Russell Street							
Rutledge Street							
Ryder Street							
Ryerson Street							
Sackett Street							
Sackman Street							
Sandford Street							
Sands Street							
Schaefer Street							
Schermerhorn Street							
Scholes Street							
Seabring Street							
Schenck Street							
Seeley Street							
Seigel Street							
Senator Street	Colonial Road	6th Avenue	0.75 mile	1	East	The street is not aligned, continues to 6th Avenue south of where it first reaches 5th Avenue.	
Sharon Street							
Sherman Street							
Skillman Street							
Smith Street							
Somers Street							
South Oxford Street							
Spencer Street							
St Edwards Street							
St Felix Street							
Stagg Street							
Stanhope Street							
Stanwix Street							
Starr Street							
State Street							
Sterling Street							
Steuben Street							
Stockholm Street							
Stockton Street							
Story Street						Formerly called Story Court	
Strauss Street							
Stryker Street							
Stuart Street							
Sullivan Street							
Sumpter Street							
Sutton Street							
Suydam Street							
Tapscott Street							
Taylor Street							
Tehama Street							
Ten Eyck Street							
Thames Street							
Thomas Street							
Thomas S. Boyland Street							
Thornton Street							
Tillary Street							
Townsend Street							
Troutman Street							
Truxton Street							
Union Street							
Van Brunt Street							
Van Buren Street							
Van Dam Street							
Vanderbilt Street							
Van Dyke Street							
Van Sicklen Street							
Varet Street							
Verona Street							
Wallabout Street							
Walton Street							
Walworth Street							
Warren Street							
Warwick Street							
Water Street	Old Fulton Street	Hudson Avenue	0.68 mile	1	West	Cut-off by Manhattan Bridge.	
Waterbury Street							
Watkins Street							
Weirfield Street							
West Street (Gravesend)	Avenue T	Shore Parkway North	1.08 miles	1-2	Varies		
West Street (Greenpoint)	Eagle Street	Quay Street	0.59 mile	1	Varies		
Whipple Street							
Willmohr Street							
Willoughby Street							
Wilson Street							
Winthrop Street							
Withers Street							
Wolcott Street							
Wyckoff Street							
Wyona Street							
York Street	Front Street	Navy Street and Hudson Avenue	0.6 mile	1	West		

==== Named streets in Greenpoint ====
The east–west streets in Greenpoint are in mostly alphabetical order from north to south. Originally, these streets were simply given lettered names such as "A Street" and "B Street", but in the mid-19th century, the streets were given longer names. This system persists today with a few exceptions: Ash, Box, Clay, Dupont, Eagle, Freeman, Greene, Huron, India, Java, Kent, Greenpoint Avenue (formerly Lincoln Street), Milton, Noble, Oak, and Quay streets. Greenpoint Avenue was formerly named Lincoln Street. There would have been a street starting with the letter "P" between Oak and Quay Streets, but it was named Calyer Street early in Greenpoint's history, after the patriarch of a nearby family.

Name	From	To	Distance	# of lanes	Traffic direction	Additional notes	Photo
Ash Street	Commercial Street/Manhattan Avenue	McGuinness Boulevard	0.13 mile	1	West	Continued as Commercial Street	
Box Street	Commercial Street	Paidge Avenue/McGuinness Boulevard	0.21 mile	1-2	Varies	Continued as Paidge Avenue	
Calyer Street							
Clay Street	Commercial Street	Paidge Avenue	0.38 mile	1	East		
Dupont Street	Commercial Street	Provost Street	0.48 mile	1-2	Varies	Cut-off by McGuinness Boulevard	
Eagle Street	West Street	Provost Street	0.5 mile	1	East	Cut-off by McGuinness Boulevard	
Freeman Street	West Street	Provost Street	0.6 mile	1	West	Cut-off by McGuinness Boulevard	
Green Street	West Street	Provost Street	0.6 mile	1	East	Cut-off by McGuinness Boulevard	
Huron Street	West Street	Provost Street	0.6 mile	1	West		
India Street	West Street	Provost Street	0.6 mile	1	East		
Java Street	West Street	Provost Street	0.6 mile	1	West		
Kent Street	West Street	Provost Street	0.6 mile	1	East		
Milton Street							
Noble Street							
Oak Street							
Quay Street	Dead-end	Franklin Street	0.13 mile	1	West		

=== Directionally numbered streets ===
==== North Streets ====
The following chart lists and describes the numbered streets directionally labeled 'North', delineated by Grand Street in Williamsburg.

Name	From	To	Distance	# of lanes	Traffic direction	Additional notes
North 1st Street	Dead-end	Driggs Avenue	0.43 mile	1	West	
North 3rd Street	Dead-end	Metropolitan Avenue	0.41 mile	1	East	
North 4th Street	Kent Avenue	Metropolitan Avenue	0.49 mile	1	West	
North 5th Street	Dead-end	Metropolitan Avenue	0.64 mile	1	Varies	
North 6th Street	Dead-end	Meeker Avenue	0.69 mile	1	West	
North 7th Street	Dead-end	Meeker Avenue	0.71 mile	1	East	
North 8th Street	Dead-end	Meeker Avenue	0.63 mile	1	West	
North 9th Street	Kent Avenue	Havenmeyer Street	0.53 mile	1	East	
North 10th Street	Dead-end	Union Avenue	0.68 mile	1	West	
North 11th Street	Dead-end	Union Avenue	0.65 mile	1	East	
North 12th Street	Dead-end	Union Avenue	0.61 mile	1	West	
North 13th Street	Kent Avenue	Berry Street	0.18 mile	1	Two-way	
North 14th Street	Kent Avenue	Berry Street	0.2 mile	1	Two-way	
North 15th Street	Franklin Street	Nassau Avenue	0.25 mile	1	West	

==== South Streets ====
The following chart lists and describes the numbered streets directionally labeled "South", delineated by Grand Street in Williamsburg.

Name	From	To	Distance	# of lanes	Traffic direction	Additional notes
South 1st Street	Kent Avenue	Union Avenue	0.82 mile	1	East	Cut-off by the Brooklyn-Queens Expressway (BQE).
South 2nd Street	Dead-end	Union Avenue	0.87 mile	1	West	Cut-off by the BQE.
South 3rd Street	Dead-end	Union Avenue	1 mile	1	East	
South 4th Street	Kent Avenue	Union Avenue	0.92 mile	1-2	Varies	Cut-off by the Williamsburg Bridge.
South 5th Street	Dead-end	Union Avenue	1.02 miles	1	East	Cut-off by the Williamsburg Bridge.
South 6th Street	Dead-end	Broadway/Bedford Avenue	0.27 mile	1	West	
South 8th Street	Kent Avenue	Broadway	0.45 mile	1	Varies	
South 9th Street	Kent Avenue	Broadway	0.51 mile	1	East	Closed-off between Kent and Wythe avenues.
South 10th Street	Wythe Avenue	Bedford Avenue	0.15 mile	1	West	
South 11th Street	Kent Avenue	Berry Street	0.13 mile	1	Varies	

==== West Streets ====
There are streets which are designated as "West #" Street. These streets are oriented north-south and lie west of Dahill Road/West Street (Gravesend). There are two streets named West 9th Street: one in Carroll Gardens and Red Hook west of 9th Street, and the other in Gravesend and Coney Island between West 8th and West 10th Streets. Only the West 9th Street in Coney Island is part of the overall "West Street" numbering system.

Street	North-end	South-end	Length	# of lanes	Traffic direction	Additional notes
West Street	Avenue T	Belt Parkway		1	South	West Street is interrupted at the north end by the McDonald playground at Avenue T, as well as the bend in McDonald Avenue starting one block further north at Kings Highway. North of Kings Highway, the street was renamed Dahill Road in the 1920s, and is also interrupted at many points. Together, West and Dahill form boundaries for the old town of Flatbush, the East and West numbered streets, and the East numbered streets to the old Brooklyn street grid. While McDonald Avenue is usually recognized as the East/West border, it can be seen that West 1st Street is to the east of McDonald Avenue, and West 2 and West 3 are also east of the Shore Road continuation of McDonald.
West 1st Street	65th Street	Sea Breeze Avenue		1	North	Exists in three segments.
West 2nd Street	65th Street	Sea Breeze Avenue		1	South	Exists in three segments.
West 3rd Street	65th Street	West Brighton Avenue		1	North	Exists in three segments.
West 4th Street	65th Street	Avenue U		1	South	
West 5th Street	65th Street	Surf Avenue		1-2	Varies	Exists in two segments.
West 6th Street	65th Street	Sheepshead Bay Road		1-4	North-South	Exists in two segments.
West 7th Street	Bay Parkway	Boynton Place		1	Varies	
West 8th Street	Bay Parkway	Coney Island Boardwalk		1-4	Varies	Exists in three segments.
West 9th Street (Gravesend/Coney Island)	Bay Parkway	86th Street		1	North	
West 9th Street (Carroll Gardens/Red Hook)	Columbia Street	Smith Street/Gowanus Canal		1	West	Is a continuation of 9th Street beyond the Gowanus Canal.
West 10th Street	Bay Parkway	Coney Island Boardwalk		1-2	Varies	Exists in two segments.
West 11th Street	Bay Parkway	Avenue X		1-2	Varies	
West 12th Street	Bay Parkway	Coney Island Boardwalk		1-2	Varies	Exists in three segments.
West 13th Street	Avenue P	Dead-end		1-2	Varies	Exists in three segments.
West 15th Street	West 15th Place	Coney Island Boardwalk		1-2	Varies	Cut-off by Coney Island Creek.
West 16th Street	Bay 50th Street	Coney Island Boardwalk		1-2	Varies	Cut-off by Coney Island Creek.
West 17th Street	Bay 50th Street	Coney Island Boardwalk		2-3	North-South	Exists in three segments, becoming the continuation of Cropsey Avenue in Coney Island.
West 19th Street	Bay 53rd Street	Dead-end		1-2	Varies	Cut-off by Coney Island Creek.
West 20th Street	Neptune Avenue	Surf Avenue		1	North	
West 21st Street	Neptune Avenue	Coney Island Boardwalk		1	South	
West 22nd Street	Shore Parkway	Coney Island Boardwalk		1-2	Varies	Cut-off by Coney Island Creek.
West 23rd Street	Dead-end north of Neptune Avenue	Coney Island Boardwalk		1	South	
West 24th Street	Neptune Avenue	Coney Island Boardwalk		1	North	
West 25th Street	Neptune Avenue	Coney Island Boardwalk		1	South	
West 27th Street	Neptune Avenue	Coney Island Boardwalk		1	North	Exists in two segments.
West 28th Street	Neptune Avenue	Coney Island Boardwalk		1	South	
West 29th Street	Neptune Avenue	Coney Island Boardwalk		1	North	
West 30th Street	Neptune Avenue	Surf Avenue		1	South	
West 31st Street	Neptune Avenue	Surf Avenue		1	North	
West 32nd Street	Neptune Avenue	Coney Island Boardwalk		1	South	Exists in two segments.
West 33rd Street	Bayview Avenue	Coney Island Boardwalk		1	South	
West 35th Street	Bayview Avenue	Coney Island Boardwalk		1	North	Exists in two segments.
West 36th Street	Bayview Avenue	Coney Island Boardwalk		1-2	Varies	
West 37th Street	Bayview Avenue	Coney Island Boardwalk		1-2	Varies	

==== East Streets ====
There are also streets which are designated as 'East X' Street. They run from East 1st Street to East 108th Street. These streets are oriented north-south and generally lie east of Dahill Road/West Street (Gravesend) which forms the western edge of the old town of Flatbush. Many of the "east" streets extend into Prospect Lefferts Gardens.

Brooklyn has no "East" streets with the following numbers:

- East 20th Street (replaced by Ocean Avenue)
- East 25th Street (replaced by Bedford Avenue)
- East 30th Street (replaced by Nostrand Avenue)
  - Note: In Marine Park, Marine Parkway diverges from Nostrand Avenue. East 31st Street is located east of Marine Parkway, but East 29th Street is located west of Nostrand Avenue. As a result, several named streets separate Nostrand Avenue and Marine Parkway.
- East 33rd Street (replaced by New York Avenue except below Flatlands Avenue in Marine Park where East 33rd Street exists.
- East 41st Street in Flatlands (mostly replaced by Albany Avenue)
- East 44th Street (replaced by Troy Avenue)
- East 47th Street (replaced by Schenectady Avenue)
- East 50th Street (replaced by Utica Avenue)
- East 62nd Street (replaced by Mill Avenue)
- East 75th Street (does not exist in the grid)
- East 90th Street (replaced by Remsen Avenue)
- East 97th Street (replaced by Rockaway Parkway)

Some of the "East Streets" do nominally exist, but for the most part, are replaced by named roads. These include:

- East 1st Street in Brighton Beach (mostly replaced by Shell Rd)
- East 6th Street in Brighton Beach (mostly replaced by Ocean Parkway)
- East 11th Street in Brighton Beach (mostly replaced by Coney Island Avenue)
- East 60th Street in Mill Basin (mostly replaced by Ralph Avenue)

=== Other numbered streets ===
==== Bay Streets ====
There are 28 "Bay Streets" in Bath Beach numbered Bay 7th Street through Bay 50th Street. Every third street (Bay 9th Street, Bay 12th Street, etc.) does not exist, and a numbered avenue takes its place. Most of them run between 86th Street and Belt Parkway.

==== Brighton Streets ====
There are 16 "Brighton Streets" in Brighton Beach, although Brighton 1st and Brighton 9th Street do not exist, while Brighton 1st Road, Brighton 1st Place, and Brighton 8th Court do.

West Brighton Avenue leads to Brighton Beach Avenue at the intersection of Ocean Parkway. After, the streets begin numerically, beginning at Brighton 1st Road, Brighton 1st Place, Brighton 2nd Street, Brighton 3rd Street, Brighton 4th Street, Brighton 5th Street, Brighton 6th Street, Brighton 7th Street before hitting Coney Island Avenue, which runs perpendicular. Then, Brighton 8th Street, Brighton 8th Court, Brighton 10th Street (which has a small cul-de-sac of small side streets named Brighton 10th Court, Brighton 10th Path, Brighton Terrace, and Brighton 10th Lane), Brighton 11th Street, Brighton 12th Street, Brighton 13th Street, Brighton 14th Street, Brighton 15th Street, ending at Corbin Place, where Manhattan Beach begins.

==== Flatlands Streets ====
There are 10 "Flatlands Streets" in eastern Canarsie. Unlike the Bay Streets, they alternate with the lettered Avenues. (e.g. Flatlands 3rd Street is not replaced by Avenue K, etc.) Each street is one block long.

==== Paerdegat Streets ====
There are 15 streets, numbered Paerdegat 1st Street through Paerdegat 15th Street, in Paerdegat, Brooklyn. They each run one block between Paerdegat Avenue North (East 76th Street) and East 80th Street.

==== Plumb Streets ====
There are three streets, Plumb 1st Street and Plumb 2nd Street, in the Plumb Beach section of Brooklyn. These streets are both very short, with Plumb 1st Street being 3 blocks long and Plumb 2nd and 3rd Street being 2 blocks long.

== Terraces ==
Name	From	To	Distance	# of lanes	Traffic direction	Additional notes
Albemarle Terrace						
Bay Cliff Terrace	68th Street	Dead-end	0.04 mile	1	South	
Bliss Terrace	68th Street	69th Street/Bay Ridge Avenue	0.07 mile	1	South	
Harbor View Terrace	80th Street	82nd Street	0.13 mile	1	South	
Kenmore Terrace						
Louise Terrace						Bay Ridge
Oceana Terrace						Brighton Beach
Perry Terrace						
Ridge Crest Terrace						
Tudor Terrace						
Wogan Terrace						

== Other ==
Name	From	To	Distance	# of lanes	Traffic direction	Additional notes
20th Drive						
21st Drive						
56th Drive						Old Mill Basin
Admiral's Row						Brooklyn Navy Yard (no longer extant)
Albee Square/Albee Square West						
Angela Drive						
Boardwalk (also known as Riegelmann Boardwalk)						2.7 miles, from West 37th Street in Coney Island to Brighton 15th Street in Brighton Beach
Bowery (aka Bowery Street)						Coney Island
Broadway						
Brookdale Plaza						Brookdale University Hospital Medical Center; Brownsville/East New York
Barlow Drive North/South						
Beach Walk		Dead-end			Small side street between Brighton Beach Avenue and the Riegelmann Boardwalk	Brighton Beach
Cadman Plaza East/West						
Clinton Wharf						Brooklyn Cruise Terminal
East Drive/West Drive						Prospect Park
East Way/West Way						
Gateway Drive						
Grace Court Alley	Hicks Street	Dead-end	0.06 mile	1	West to east	
Grand Army Plaza						Prospect Park
Jones Walk						Coney Island
Kings Highway	East 98th Street	Bay Parkway				
Leif Ericson Drive						
Liberty Way						
Marshall Drive						
Mayfair Drive North/South						
National Drive						
Navy Walk						Brooklyn Navy Yard
North Oxford Walk						
Ocean Drive						Coney Island
Oceana Drive East/West						Brighton Beach
One Blue Slip						Greenpoint
Park Circle					a.k.a. Machate Circle	Prospect Park
Pineapple Walk						
Prospect Park West						
Schweikerts Walk						Coney Island
Stagg Walk						
Ten Eyck Walk						
Twin Pines Drive and/or Twin Pines Drive East						
Vince Lombardi Square						Sheepshead Bay
Whitman Drive						

=== Fort Hamilton ===
The following thoroughfares are located inside Fort Hamilton, the last active-duty military post in New York City, and are under federal jurisdiction: Roosevelt Avenue, Schum Avenue, Walke Avenue, Warren Avenue (formerly General Lee Avenue), White Avenue (also N. White Avenue), Marshall Drive, Sterling Drive, Stonewall Jackson Drive, Wainwright Drive, Washington Drive, Pershing Loop North/South, Sheridan Loop, Grimes Road, MacArthur (or Macarthur) Road, Schum Road, Washington Road, Pence Street (partially), and 101st Street (partially).
