= 20th Avenue station (BMT West End Line) =

New York City Subway station in Brooklyn

20 Avenue
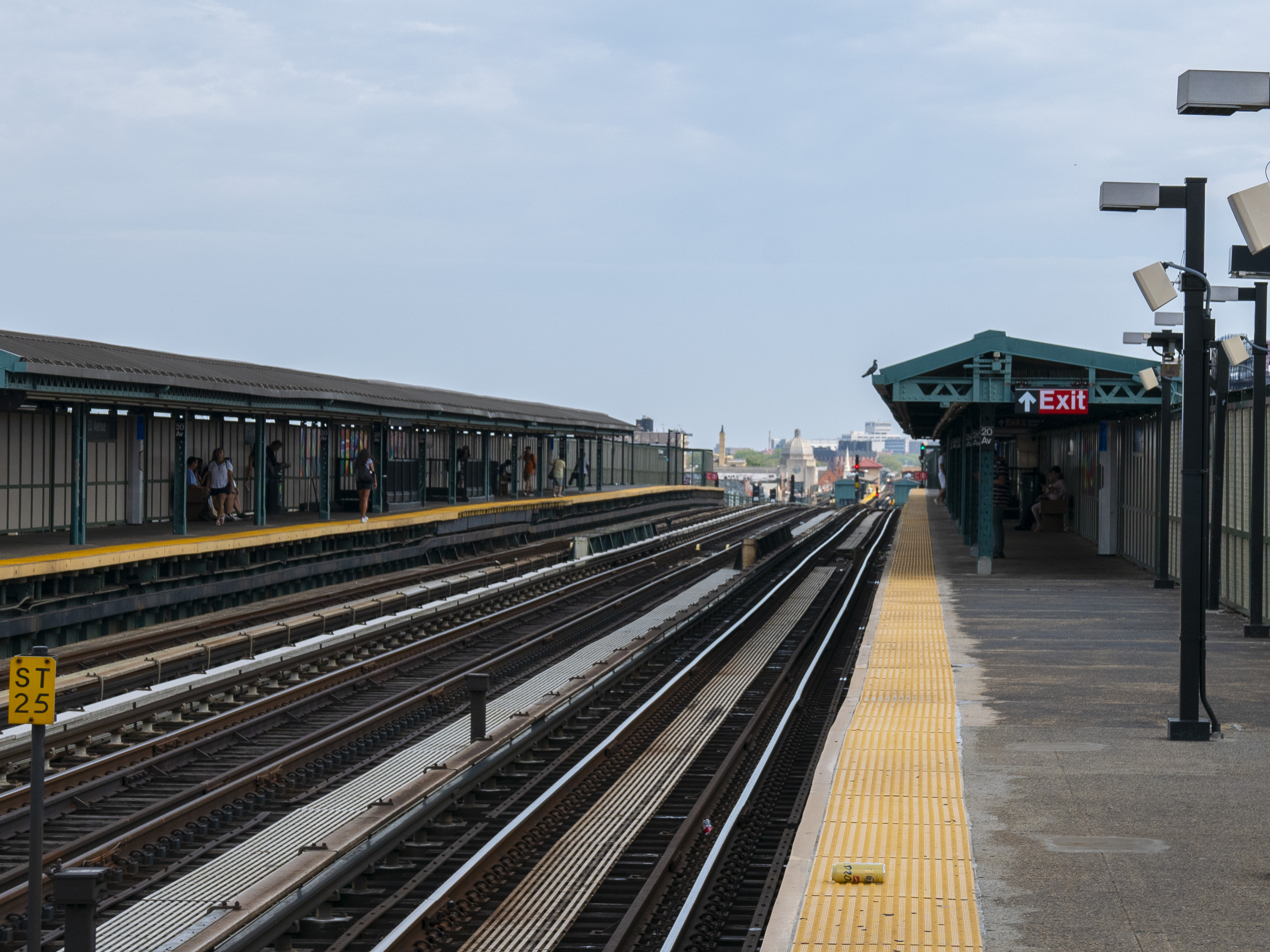
- View from southbound platform

Station statistics
- Address: 20th Avenue & 86th Street; Brooklyn, New York
- Borough: Brooklyn
- Locale: Bensonhurst, Bath Beach
- Coordinates: 40.6047°N 73.9985°W
- Division: B (BMT)
- Line: BMT West End Line
- Services: D (all times)
- Transit: NYCT Bus: B1
- Structure: Elevated
- Platforms: 2 side platforms
- Tracks: 3 (2 in regular service)

Other information
- Opened: July 29, 1916 (110 years ago)

Traffic
- 2025: 1,194,033 ▲3%
- Rank: 279 out of 423
Services
Preceding station	New York City Subway	Following station
18th Avenue toward Norwood–205th Street	Local	Bay Parkway toward Coney Island–Stillwell Avenue
and do not stop here
Location
Location within New York City Subway
Location within New York City
Location within New York
Track layout
Street map
Station service legend
Symbol	Description
Stops all times	Stops all times

The 20th Avenue station is a local station on the BMT West End Line of the New York City Subway, located at the intersection of 20th Avenue and 86th Street on the border of Bensonhurst and Bath Beach in Brooklyn. It is served by the D train at all times.

== History ==
20th Avenue opened on July 29, 1916, as part of an extension of the BMT West End Line from 18th Avenue to 25th Avenue. The line was originally a surface excursion railway to Coney Island, called the Brooklyn, Bath and Coney Island Railroad, which was established in 1862, but did not reach Coney Island until 1864. Under the Dual Contracts of 1913, an elevated line was built over New Utrecht Avenue, 86th Street and Stillwell Avenue, replacing the surface railway.

The platforms were extended in the 1950s to accommodate the current standard B Division train length of 615 feet (187 m).

In 2012, the station was rehabilitated with funding from the American Recovery and Reinvestment Act of 2009.

== Station layout ==
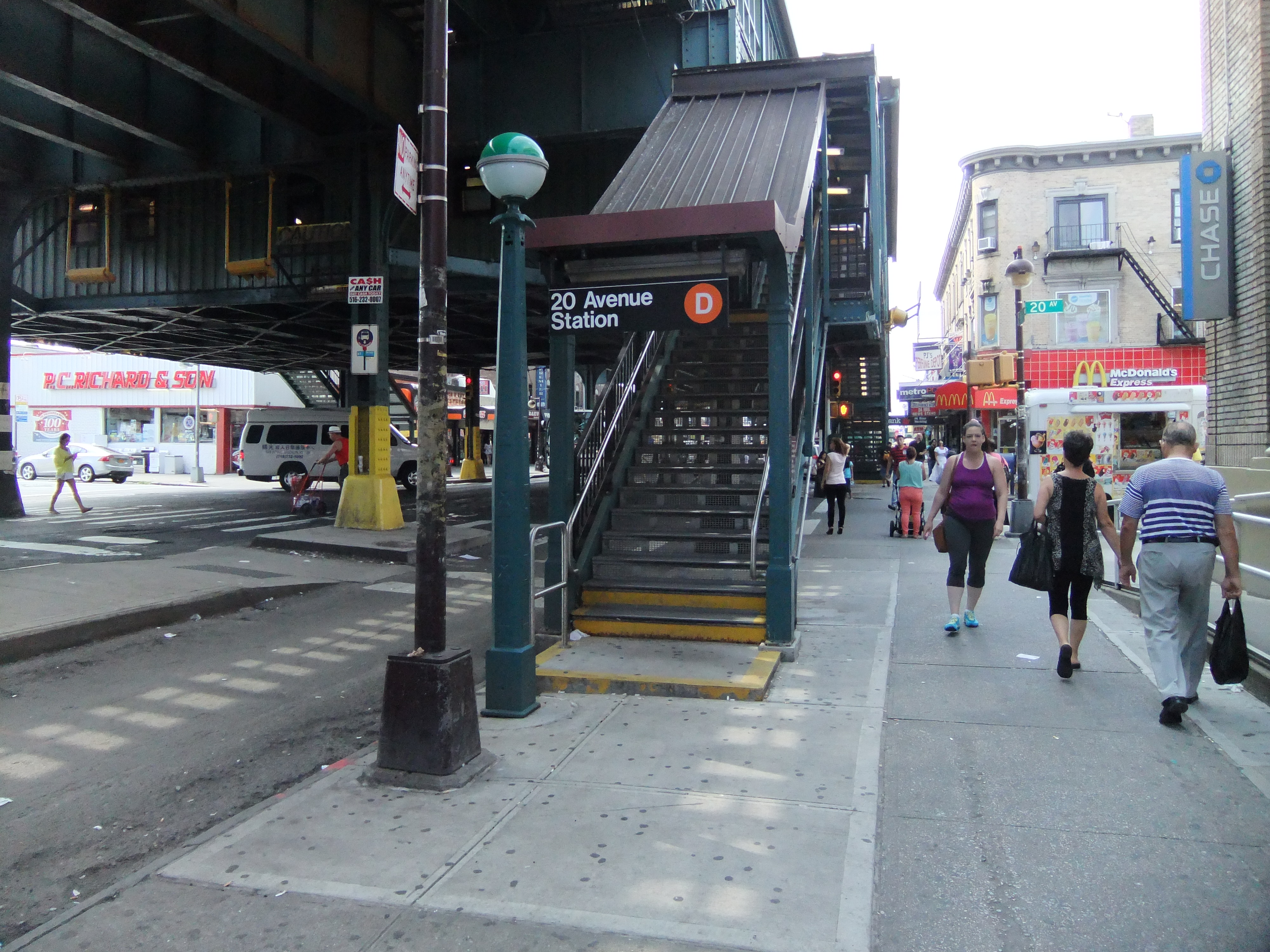
Southwestern stair

This elevated station has two side platforms and three tracks. The center express track is not normally used. The Coney Island-bound platform is slightly to the south of the Manhattan-bound platform, which accounts for the locations where the platforms were extended.

Both platforms have beige windscreens along their entire length and brown canopies with green frames and support columns in the center. The exposed section of the platforms have black, full-height lampposts at regular intervals. The station signs feature the standard black station name plate with white lettering.

The 2012 artwork here is called Kaleidoscope by Odili Donald Odita. It features abstract laminated glass windows on the platform windscreens based on Odita's visual memories of the Bensonhurst neighborhood.

=== Exits ===
This station has one elevated station house beneath the center of the platforms and tracks. Two staircases from each platform go down to a waiting area/crossunder, where a turnstile bank provides access to and from the station. Outside fare control, there is a token booth and four staircases going down to all corners of 20th Avenue and 86th Street.
