= Bay Parkway station (BMT West End Line) =

New York City Subway station in Brooklyn

Bay Parkway
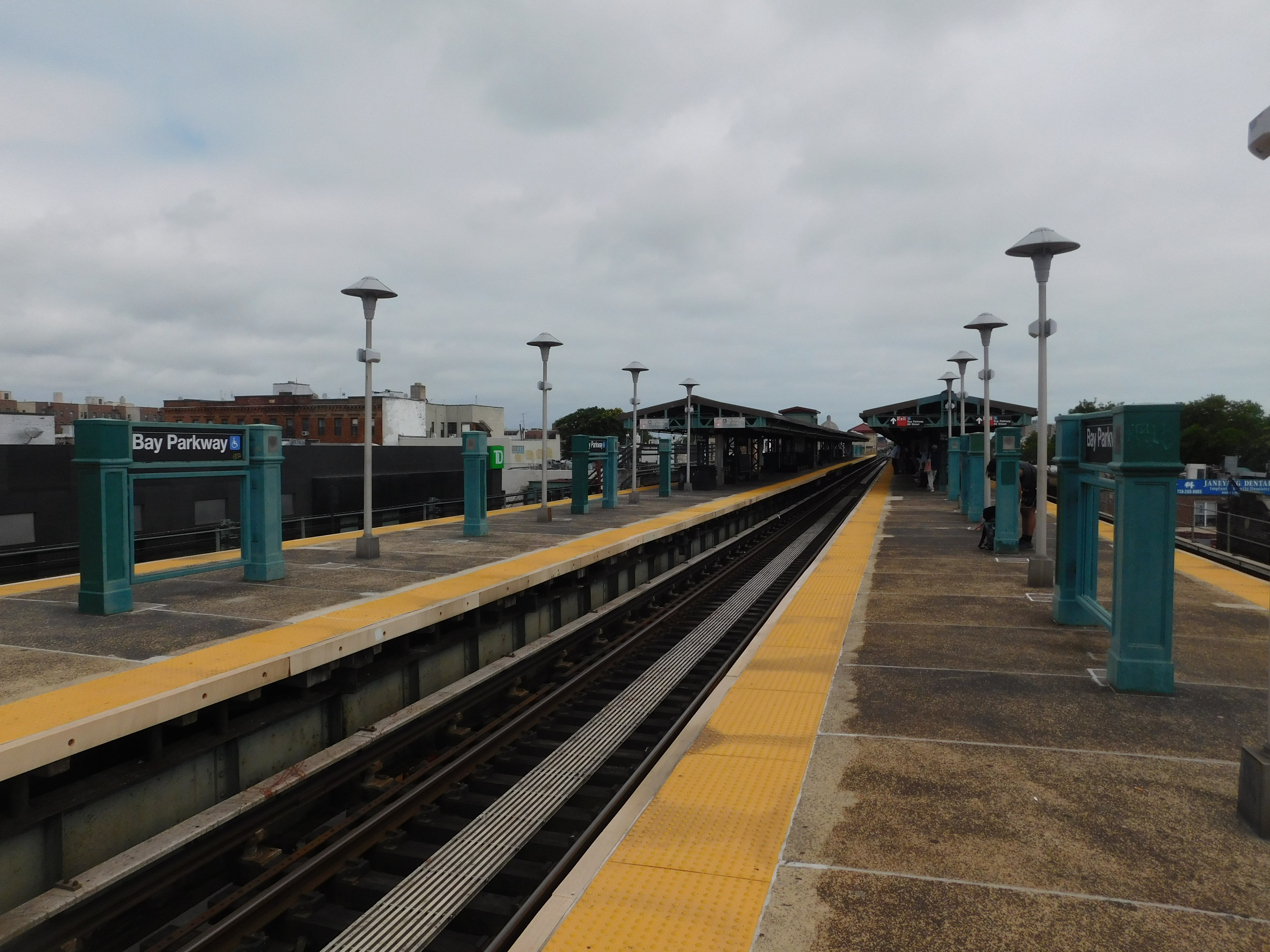

Station statistics
- Address: Bay Parkway & 86th Street; Brooklyn, New York
- Borough: Brooklyn
- Locale: Bensonhurst, Bath Beach, Gravesend
- Coordinates: 40.602655°N 73.994293°W
- Division: B (BMT)
- Line: BMT West End Line
- Services: D (all times); R (one southbound a.m. rush-hour trip); W (two southbound a.m. rush-hour trips)
- Transit: NYCT Bus: B1, B6, B82, B82 SBS
- Structure: Elevated
- Platforms: 2 island platforms cross-platform interchange
- Tracks: 3 (2 in regular service)

Other information
- Opened: July 29, 1916; 110 years ago
- Accessible: Yes
- Former/other names: Bay Parkway–22nd Avenue

Traffic
- 2025: 1,716,214 ▲1.5%
- Rank: 207 out of 423
Services
Preceding station	New York City Subway	Following station
20th Avenue toward Norwood–205th Street	Local	25th Avenue toward Coney Island–Stillwell Avenue
Non-revenue services and lines
Preceding station	New York City Subway	Following station
62nd Street express	no service	Coney Island–Stillwell Avenue express
Location
Location within New York City Subway
Location within New York City
Location within New York
Track layout
Street map
Station service legend
Symbol	Description
Stops all times	Stops all times
- Bay Parkway Station (Dual System BRT)
- U.S. National Register of Historic Places
- New York State Register of Historic Places
- MPS: New York City Subway System MPS
- NRHP reference No.: 05000670
- NYSRHP No.: 04701.013870

Significant dates
- Added to NRHP: July 6, 2005
- Designated NYSRHP: May 11, 2005

The Bay Parkway station (formerly Bay Parkway–22nd Avenue station) is an express station on the BMT West End Line of the New York City Subway, located at the intersection of Bay Parkway and 86th Street in Brooklyn. The station is served by the D train at all times. During the morning rush hour, one southbound R train and two southbound W trains terminate here.

== History ==
Bay Parkway opened on July 29, 1916, as part of an extension of the BMT West End Line from 18th Avenue to 25th Avenue. The line was originally a surface excursion railway to Coney Island, called the Brooklyn, Bath and Coney Island Railroad, which was established in 1862, but did not reach Coney Island until 1864. Under the Dual Contracts of 1913, an elevated line was built over New Utrecht Avenue, 86th Street and Stillwell Avenue, replacing the surface railway.

The platforms were extended in the 1950s to accommodate the current standard B Division train length of 615 feet (187 m).

This station was the southern terminal for M service during rush hours until June 28, 2010.

In 2012, the station was rehabilitated and three passenger elevators (one from each platform to the mezzanine, and one from the mezzanine to street level) were added with funding from the American Recovery and Reinvestment Act of 2009.

== Station layout ==
This elevated station has three tracks and two island platforms. D trains stop here at all times, making local stops. Effective December 2024, during the morning rush hour, one southbound R train and two southbound W trains terminate here on the express track. The next station to the north is 20th Avenue, while the next station to the south is 25th Avenue. Both platforms have brown canopies with green frames and support columns in their center as well as wooden benches surrounded by green windscreens. On either sides, there are windscreen-style station signs and round lampposts. There is a signal tower at the south end of the station, at the end of the northbound platform.

This station was the terminus for the M train from 1987 to 2010 during rush hours. Although both platforms had signs indicating M trains used the center express track, they actually operated from the local tracks because there are no switches north of the station to allow trains to switch to the express track. South of the platforms, two diamond crossovers were used for M trains to relay or be stored on the center track before switching to the Manhattan-bound local one for the trip northbound.

A concrete structure was built over the steel at this station. On July 6, 2005, it was listed on the National Register of Historic Places.

=== Exits ===
This station has one metal station house with concrete floors below the platforms and tracks. Two staircases from each platform go down to a waiting area/crossover, where a turnstile bank provides access to and from the station. Outside fare control, there is a token booth and four staircases going down to all corners of Bay Parkway and 86th Street. The station house formerly had windows on all four sides. However, all of them except the ones on the west side have been covered with tar.

== Gallery ==
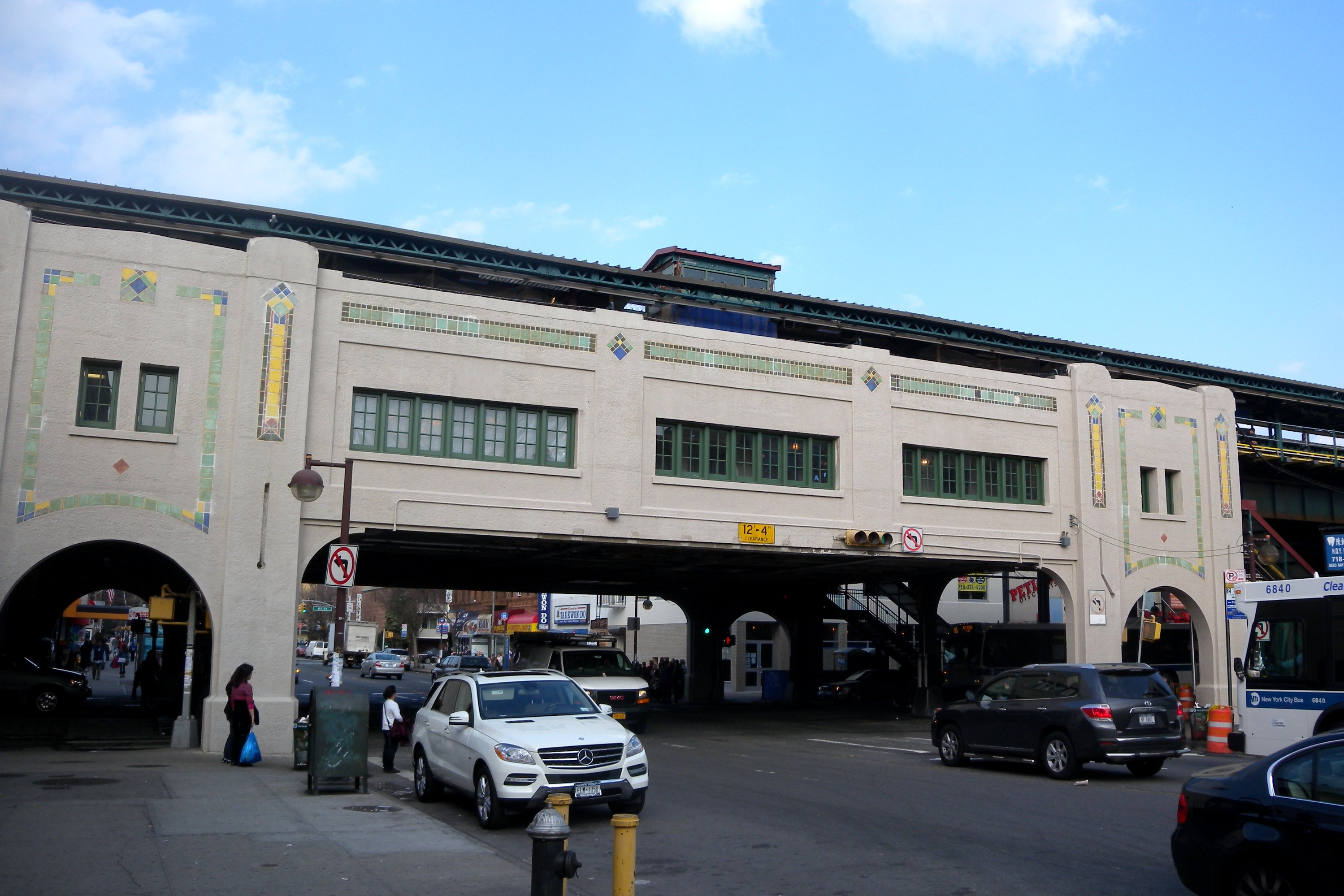
Elevated station house and structure

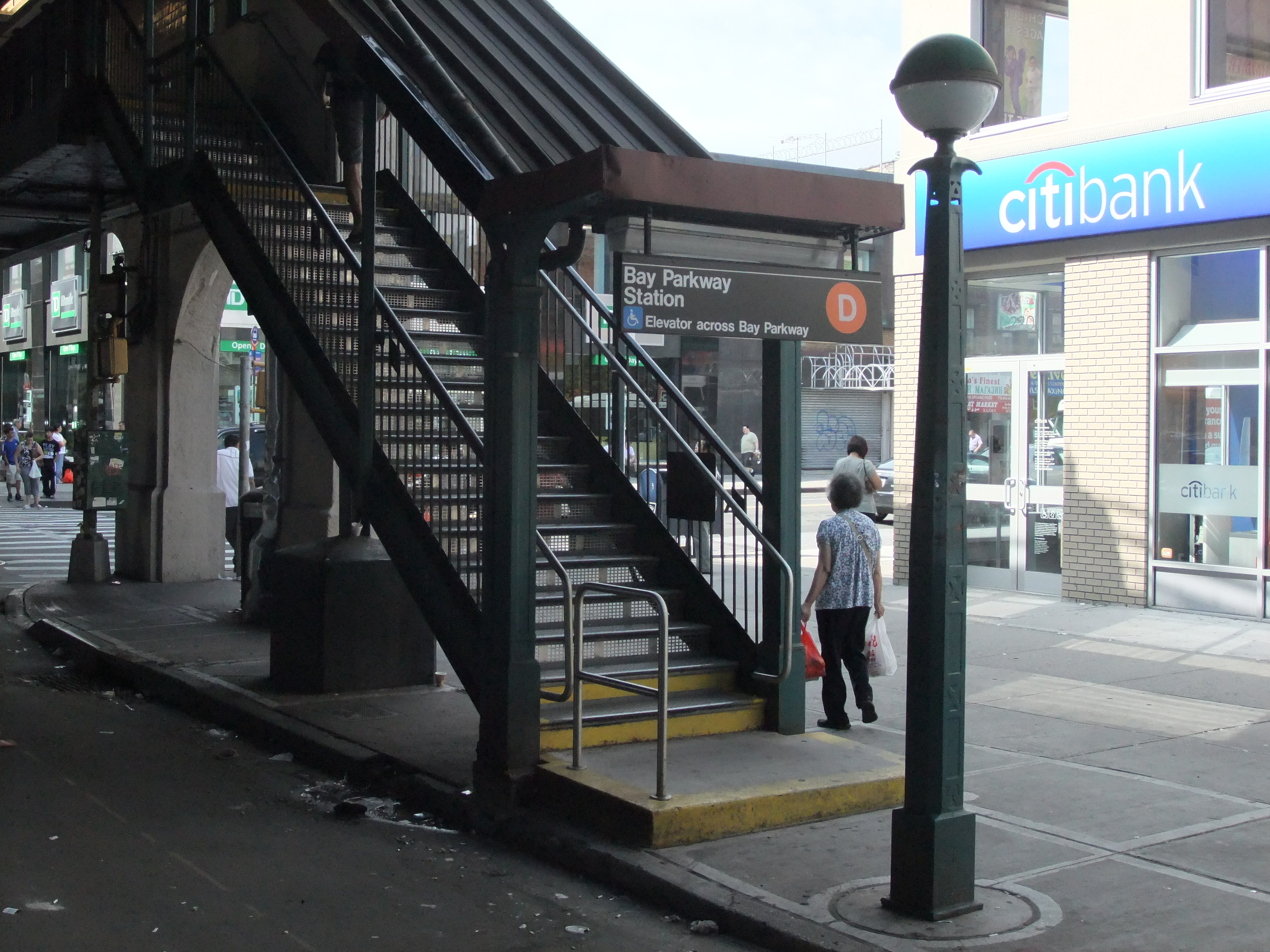
Southeastern street stair

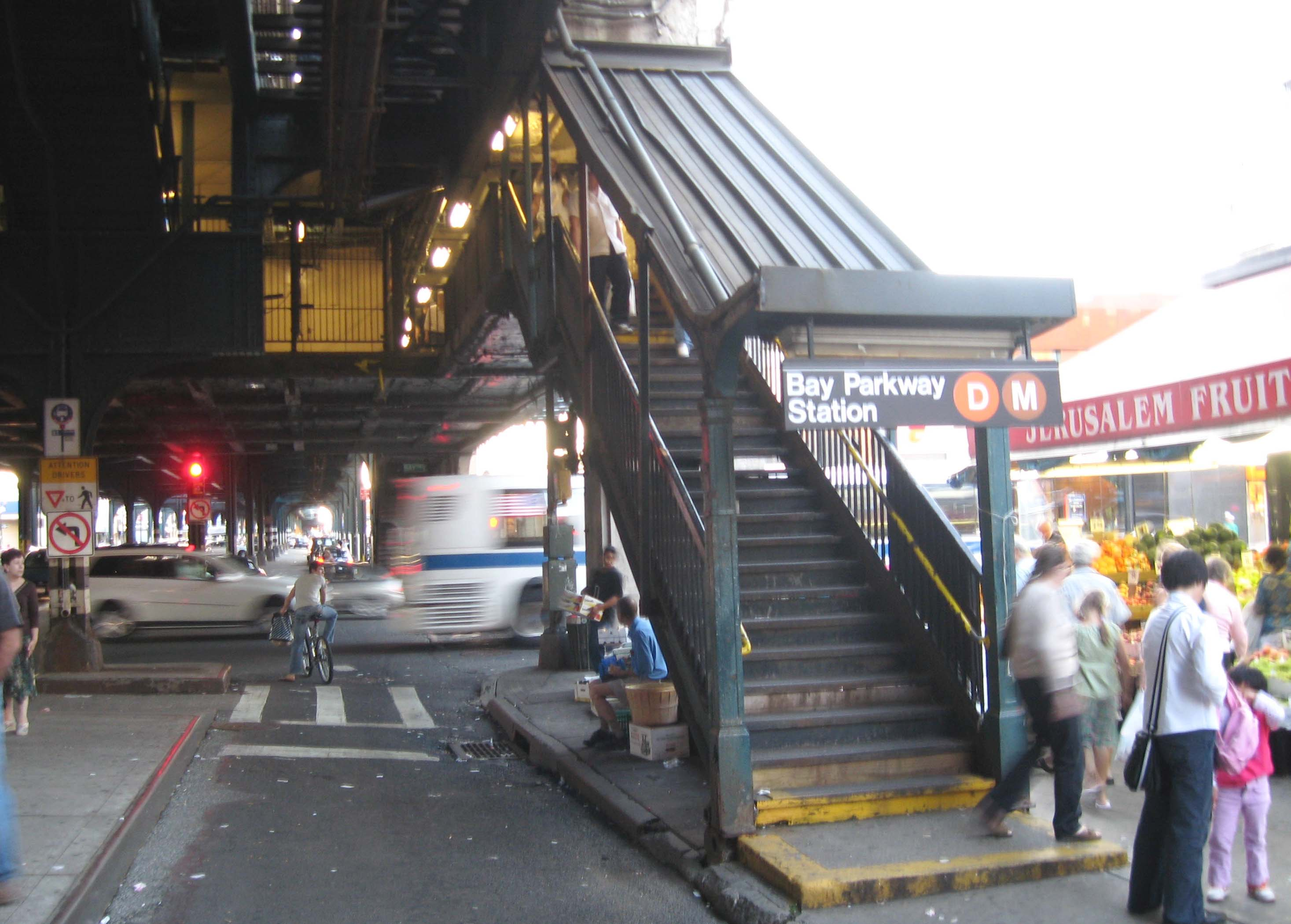
Street stair before M train service to the station was discontinued

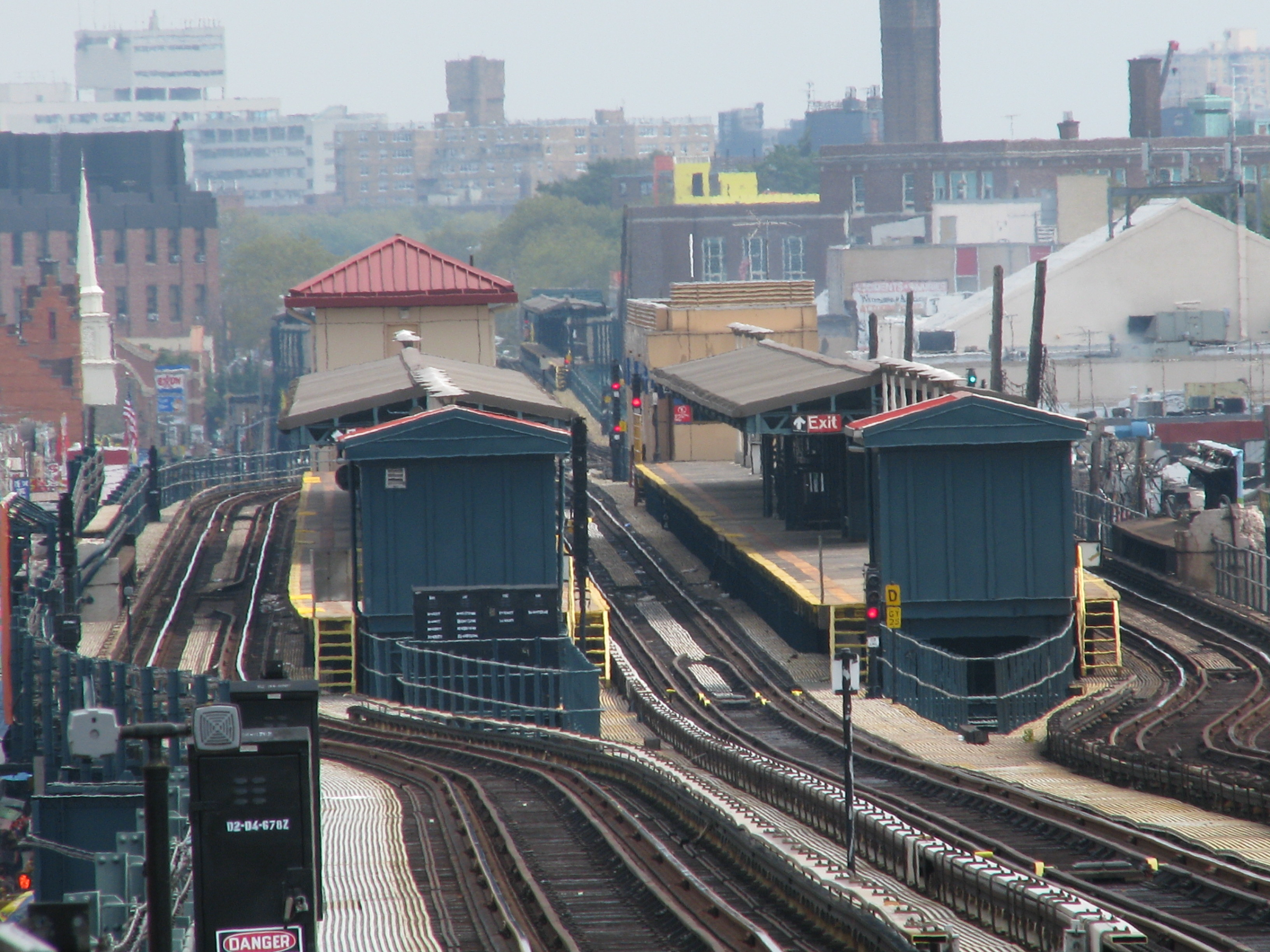
The station as seen from the 20th Avenue station down the line

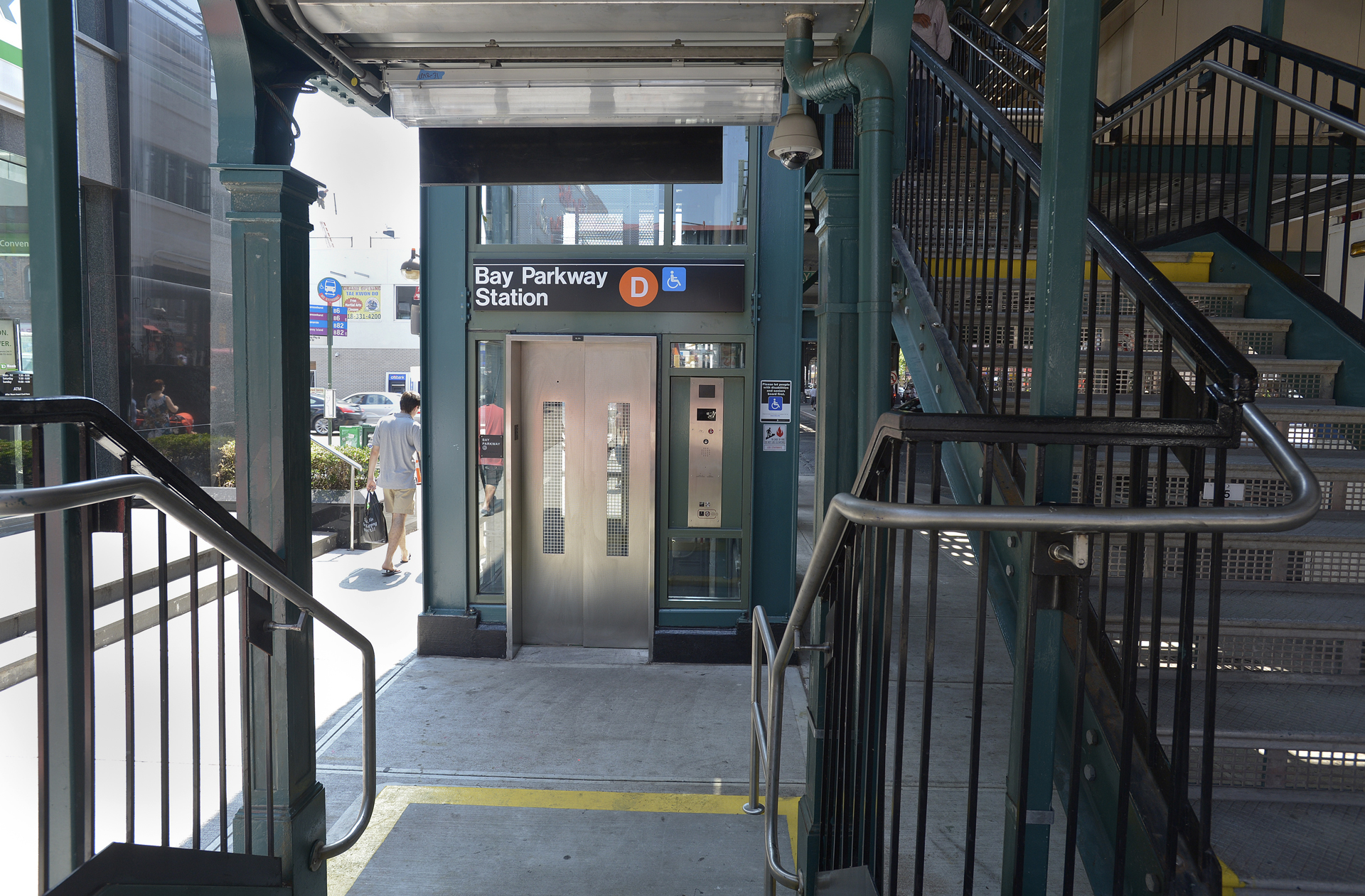
One of three new elevators

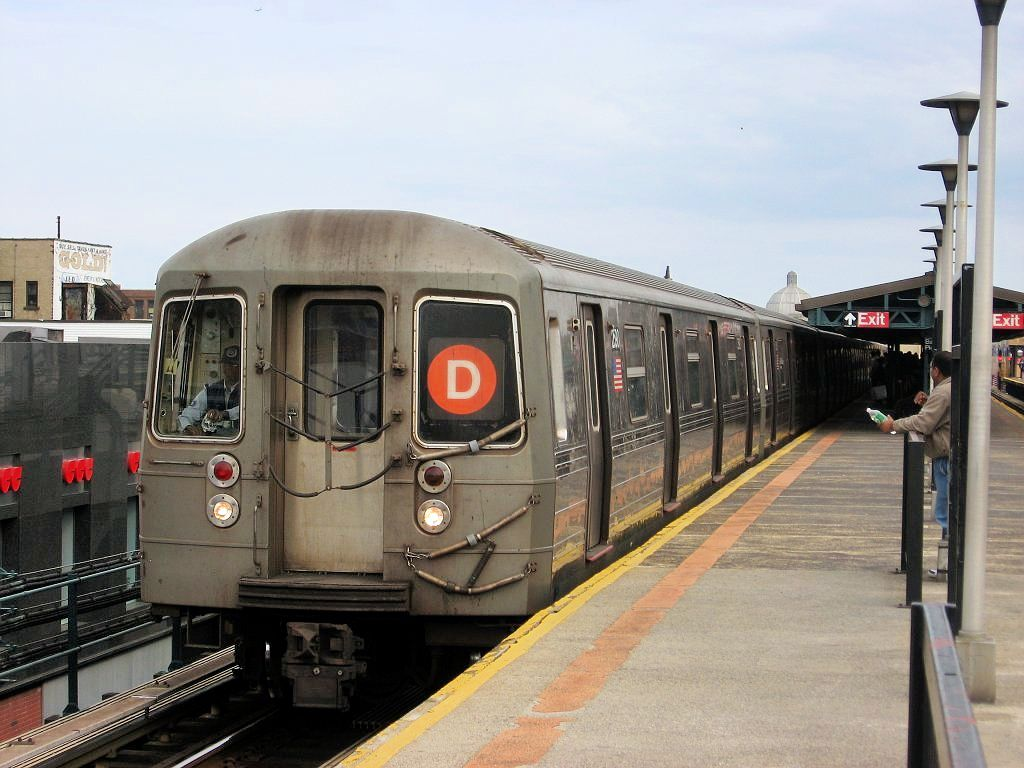
Manhattan-bound D train at the station

== See also ==
- National Register of Historic Places listings in Brooklyn
