= BMT West End Line =

New York City Subway line

- The D train serves the entire BMT West End Line at all times.

Overview
- Owner: City of New York
- Locale: Brooklyn, New York City
- Termini: Ninth Avenue; Coney Island–Stillwell Avenue
- Stations: 13

Service
- Type: Rapid transit
- System: New York City Subway
- Operator: New York City Transit Authority
- Daily ridership: 49,737 (2023)

History
- Opened: June 24, 1916; 110 years ago
- Last extension: 1917

Technical
- Line length: 4.5 miles (7.2 km)
- Number of tracks: 3–6
- Character: Open Cut (Ninth Avenue only) /Surface along Coney Island Yard/ Elevated
- Track gauge: 4 ft 8 1/2 in (1,435 mm) standard gauge
- Electrification: 600 V DC third rail

The BMT West End Line is a line of the New York City Subway, serving the Brooklyn communities of Sunset Park, Borough Park, New Utrecht, Bensonhurst, Bath Beach and Coney Island. The D train operates local on the entire line at all times. There is a center express track and three express stations along the line, but there is no regular express service. The center track is used during the morning rush hour by one southbound R train and two southbound W trains.

The elevated line, originally mapped as the New Utrecht Avenue Line (though the common name prevailed after construction), replaced the surface West End Line.

== Extent and service ==
The following services use part or all of the BMT West End Line:

	Time period	Section of line
"D" train	all times	full line
"R" train	weekday mornings	north of Bay Parkway
"W" train	weekday mornings	north of Bay Parkway

The line begins as a branch of the BMT Fourth Avenue Line south of the 36th Street station, and it extends through a cut described as the 38th Street cut to Ninth Avenue. Then it becomes an elevated structure over New Utrecht Avenue, before subsequently turning through private property near 79th Street into 86th Street. The line then continues over 86th Street to Stillwell Avenue and to the line's terminal at Coney Island.

== History ==
The line was originally a surface excursion railway to Coney Island, called the Brooklyn, Bath and Coney Island Railroad, which was established in 1862, but did not reach Coney Island until 1864. Under the Dual Contracts of 1913, an elevated line was built over New Utrecht Avenue, 86th Street and Stillwell Avenue.

From 39th Street to Coney Island, the old route was abandoned as a rapid transit line, and it was turned into a surface car line. Surface car operation began on the line once the new elevated service started.

The first portion of the line, between the 36th Street station on Fourth Avenue and 62nd Street station, opened on June 24, 1916, with two tracks. On the same date, the line opened three more stations to 18th Avenue, but with only one track in service. The second track between 62nd Street and 18th Avenue opened on July 8, 1916. The line was then extended to 25th Avenue on July 29, 1916. The line opened to and fully opening to Coney Island on July 21, 1917. The original surface right-of-way was retained for use by trolley cars to provide local service and protect the company's franchise.

As part of an 18-month capital budget that took effect on January 1, 1963, the wooden platforms at the stations on the West End Line were replaced with concrete platforms.

On November 13, 1985, the New York City Transit Authority announced that an almost four-year-long renovation of the line would begin in spring 1986. As part of the project, tracks and girders would be repaired, and stations would be rehabilitated. To enable sections of the local tracks to be taken out of service for long periods of time for the work, trains would operate on the center express track and stop at local stations through the use of temporary platforms that would be constructed atop the local track.

=== Service history ===
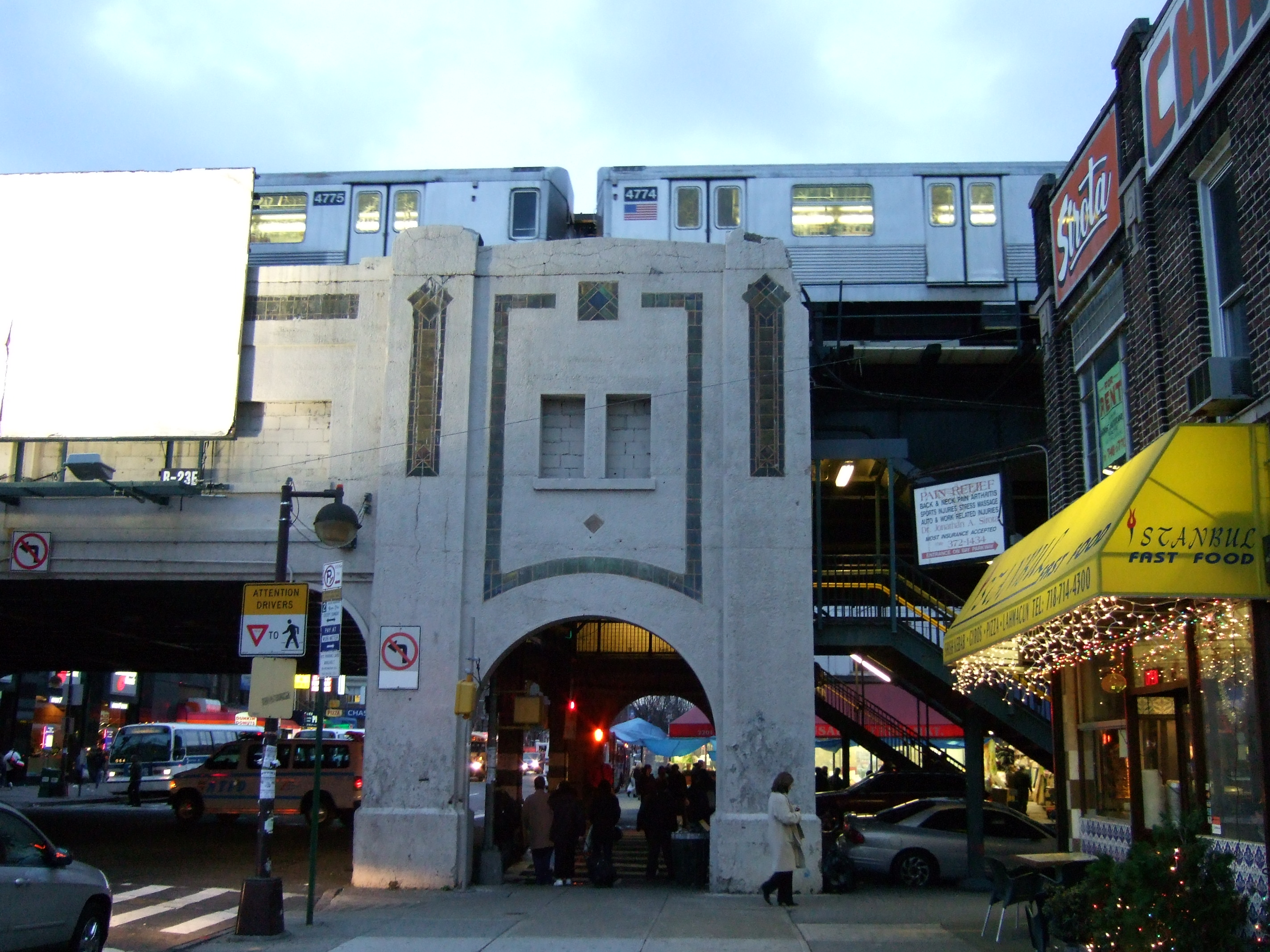
Elevated line over 86th Street at Bay Parkway station

The West End Line has had an express (on the BMT Fourth Avenue Line) service – labeled 3 in 1924 – since it opened in 1916, passing over the Manhattan Bridge and onto the BMT Broadway Line express tracks. In the late 1950s, midday trains were switched to the local Fourth Avenue tracks and through the Montague Street Tunnel, and late night and Sunday service became a shuttle between Coney Island and 36th Street. The express and local services were assigned the designations T and TT in the early 1960s. With the opening of the Chrystie Street Connection in late 1967, the B train from Manhattan was extended to Coney Island, absorbing the T and TT (both the B and T ran express on Fourth Avenue). The TT late night and Sunday shuttle survived until 1968, when the B became full-time. It ran local on Fourth Avenue during late night hours, but express at all other times. Late night operation was cut back to a shuttle to 36th Street in 1976.

In 2001, when reconstruction of the Manhattan Bridge north tracks resumed, the B service in Brooklyn was replaced by the new W train, which ran as a shuttle not only to 36th Street during nighttime hours, but also to Atlantic Avenue–Pacific Street on weekends. In 2002, reconstruction of Coney Island–Stillwell Avenue resulted in the West End Line being the only line to serve the terminal and the W was extended full-time into Manhattan, using the local Fourth Avenue tracks and Montague Street Tunnel on weekends and late nights hours.

In 2004, the Manhattan Bridge reconstruction project was completed, and the W was replaced with an extended D train, running over the bridge at all hours and express on Fourth Avenue except late nights. D service was moved to the West End Line instead of returning to the Brighton Line, where it ran on from 1967 to 2001, because West End Line residents from Chinatowns in Brooklyn wanted full-time access to Grand Street, on the Sixth Avenue Line in Manhattan's Chinatown. This also eliminated the need to run late-night and/or weekend shuttles on either the Concourse Line or the West End Line.

The other service pattern was the "West End Short Line", a rush-hour local (on Fourth Avenue) service between the BMT Nassau Street Line in Lower Manhattan and 62nd Street or Bay Parkway. It became part of the TT in the early 1960s and was discontinued in 1967. In 1987, the short line service was essentially recreated when the rush-hour M extension to Brooklyn was moved from the BMT Brighton Line to the West End Line terminating at Bay Parkway. It terminated at Ninth Avenue during midday hours until 1995, when it was cut back to Chambers Street. It was extended again from 2001–2004 while the Manhattan Bridge was closed for reconstruction. In 2010, as part of a series of MTA budget cuts, rush-hour M service was discontinued.

On July 19, 2019, a project to install elevators at the 62nd Street/New Utrecht Avenue station was completed. Starting on September 18, 2021, and continuing until January 3, 2022, southbound D trains terminated at Bay 50th Street so work could be completed to protect Coney Island Yard from flooding.

== Signage history ==
After 1967, the BMT 3 & T services were discontinued, and the services became the B & TT

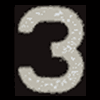
The BMT 3 bullet used on the D Triplex

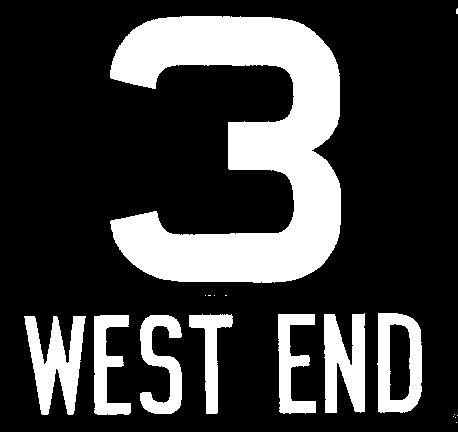
Pre-1967 BMT 2 bullet used on the R1s to R9s

== Station listing ==
Station service legend
Stops all times	Stops 24 hours a day
Time period details
Disabled access	Station is compliant with the Americans with Disabilities Act
↑	Station is compliant with the Americans with Disabilities Act in the indicated direction only
↓	Station is compliant with the Americans with Disabilities Act in the indicated direction only
	Elevator access to mezzanine only

Neighborhood	Disabled access	Station	Tracks	Services	Opened	Transfers and notes
splits from the BMT Fourth Avenue Line (D R W )
Center Express track begins (No Regular Service)
connecting tracks to former BMT Culver Line (demolished)
connecting tracks to 36th–38th Street Yard from local tracks
Sunset Park		Ninth Avenue	all	D R W	June 24, 1916	former transfer to BMT Culver Line
Borough Park		Fort Hamilton Parkway	local	D	June 24, 1916	
Borough Park		50th Street	local	D	June 24, 1916	
Borough Park		55th Street	local	D	June 24, 1916	
Bensonhurst	Disabled access	62nd Street	all	D R W	June 24, 1916	BMT Sea Beach Line (N W ) at New Utrecht Avenue
Bensonhurst		71st Street	local	D	June 24, 1916	
Bensonhurst		79th Street	local	D	June 24, 1916	
Bensonhurst		18th Avenue	local	D	June 24, 1916	
Bensonhurst		20th Avenue	local	D	July 29, 1916	
Bensonhurst	Disabled access	Bay Parkway	all	D R W	July 29, 1916	B82 Select Bus Service
Bensonhurst		25th Avenue	local	D	July 29, 1916	
connecting track to Coney Island Yard
Gravesend		Bay 50th Street	local	D	July 21, 1917	
connecting track to Coney Island Yard
Center Express track ends
Coney Island	Disabled access	Coney Island–Stillwell Avenue	all	D	July 21, 1917	BMT Brighton Line (Q ) IND Culver Line (F <F>); BMT Sea Beach Line (N )

== In popular culture ==
Over the years, the West End line has been featured in movies and television shows.

- The famous chase scene from The French Connection (1971) was filmed under the West End Line.
- The opening scene of Saturday Night Fever (1977) features Tony Manero (John Travolta) walking down 86th Street, with the West End elevated line above.
- The opening credits of the television show Welcome Back, Kotter (1975) also featured the West End Line.
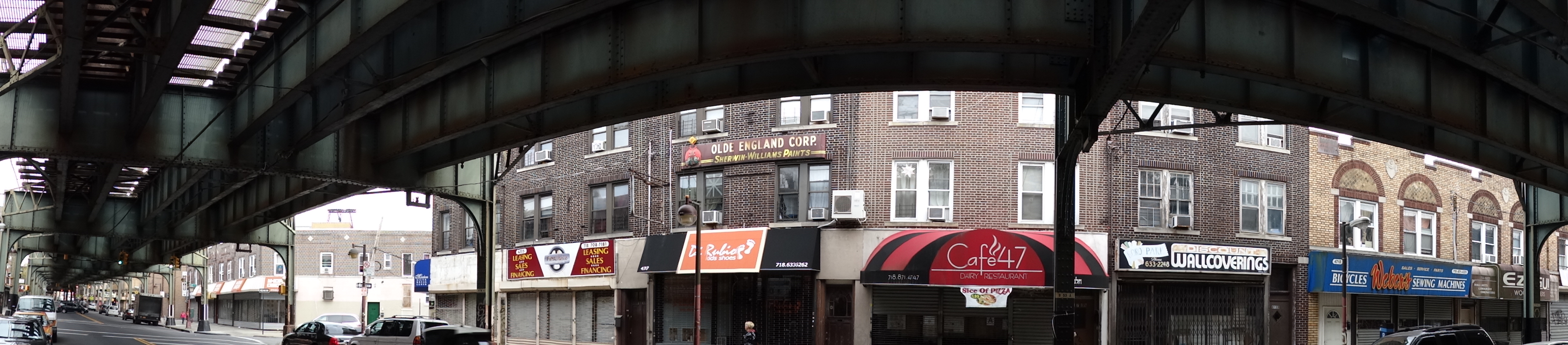
Under the structure, between 50th Street and Fort Hamilton Parkway stations

== See also ==
- Transportation to Coney Island
