= 25th Avenue station =

New York City Subway station in Brooklyn

25 Avenue
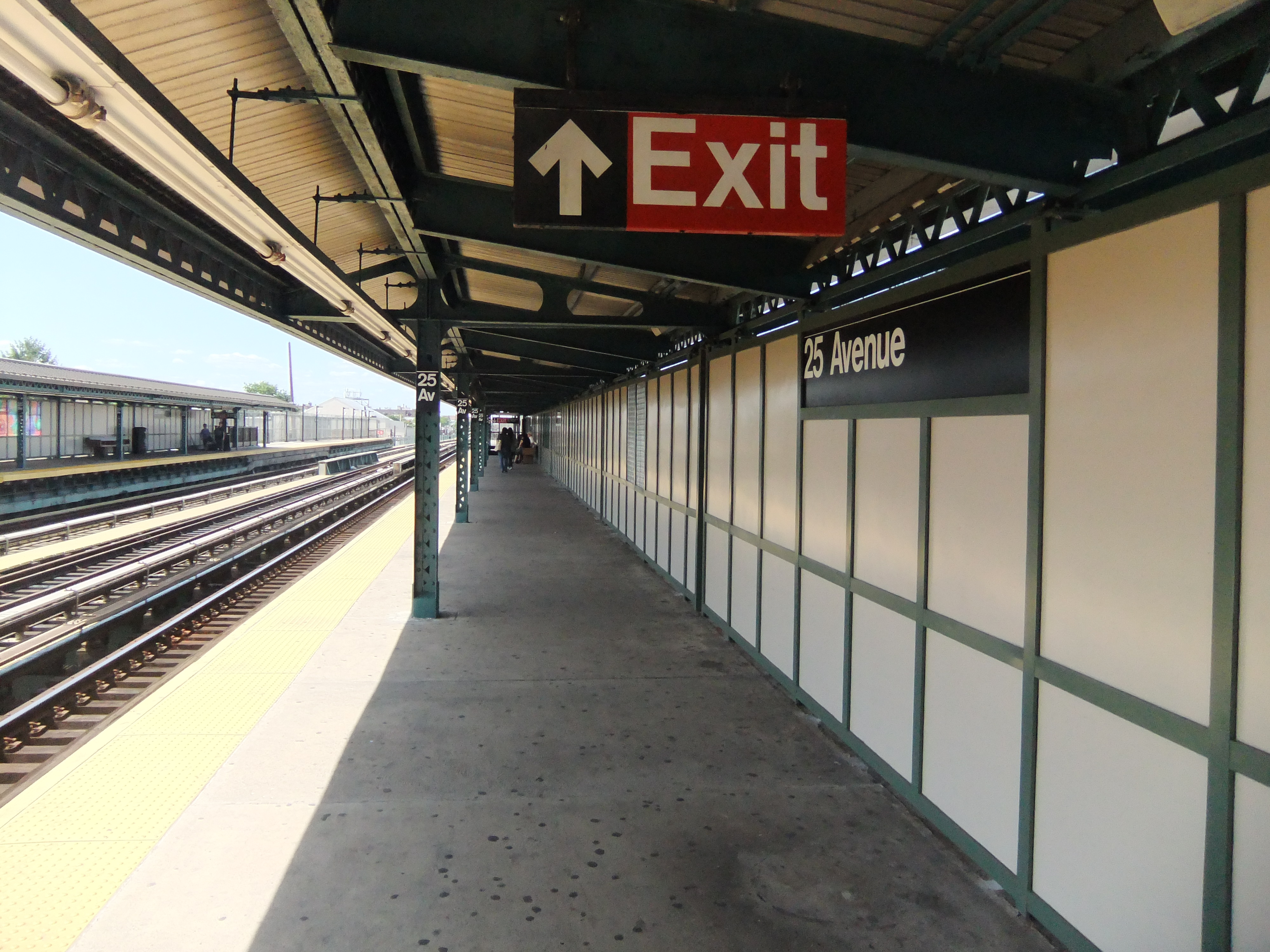

Station statistics
- Address: 25th Avenue & 86th Street; Brooklyn, New York
- Borough: Brooklyn
- Locale: Gravesend
- Coordinates: 40.5977°N 73.98679°W
- Division: B (BMT)
- Line: BMT West End Line
- Services: D (all times)
- Transit: NYCT Bus: B1, B3, B4
- Structure: Elevated
- Platforms: 2 side platforms
- Tracks: 3 (2 in regular service)

Other information
- Opened: July 29, 1916 (110 years ago)

Traffic
- 2025: 943,973 ▲0.4%
- Rank: 321 out of 423
Services
Preceding station	New York City Subway	Following station
Bay Parkway toward Norwood–205th Street	Local	Bay 50th Street toward Coney Island–Stillwell Avenue
Location
Location within New York City Subway
Location within New York City
Location within New York
Track layout
Street map
Station service legend
Symbol	Description
Stops all times	Stops all times

The 25th Avenue station is a local station on the BMT West End Line of the New York City Subway, located in Brooklyn at the intersection of 25th Avenue and 86th Street, in the Gravesend neighborhood of Brooklyn. This station is served by the D train at all times.

== History ==
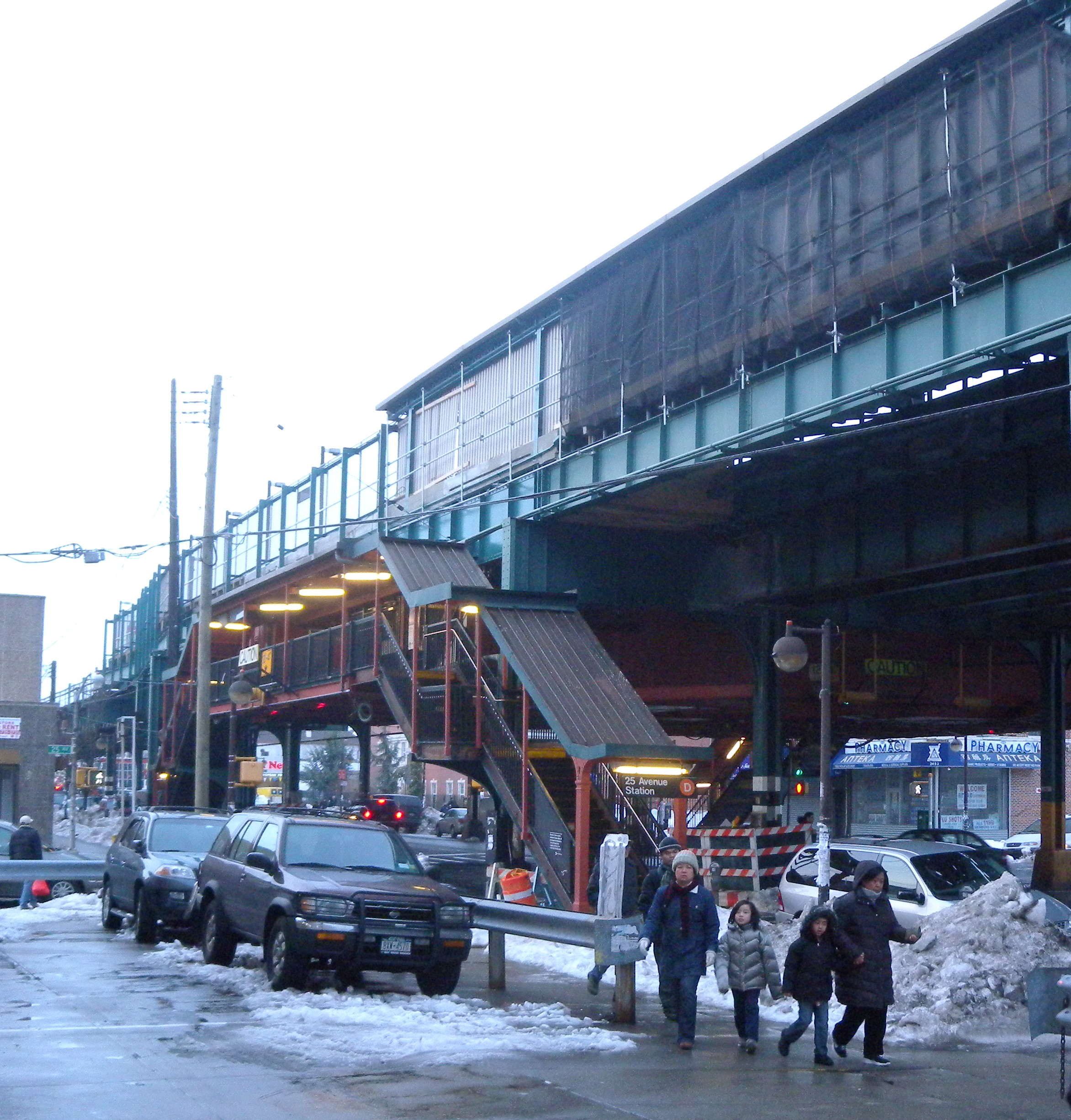
Street stair

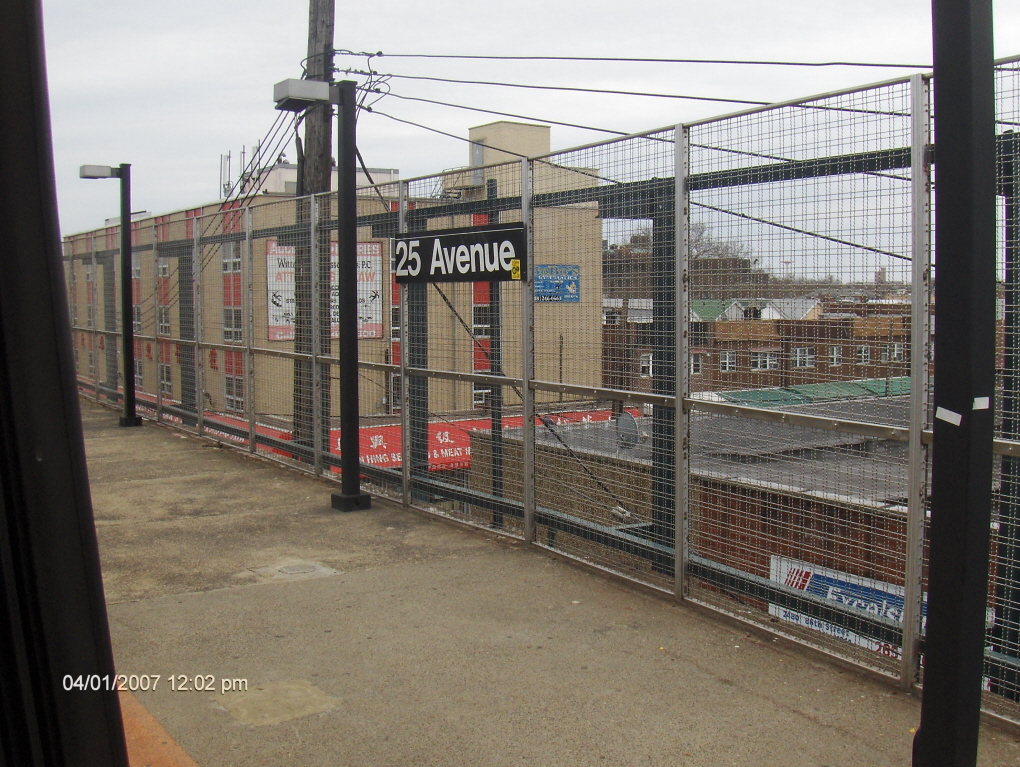
Sign on the mesh windscreen

25th Avenue opened on July 29, 1916, as the terminal station of an extension of the BMT West End Line from 18th Avenue. With the completion of the line to Coney Island on July 21, 1917, this station ceased to be the line's terminus.

The line was originally a surface excursion railway to Coney Island, called the Brooklyn, Bath and Coney Island Railroad, which was established in 1862, but did not reach Coney Island until 1864. Under the Dual Contracts of 1913, an elevated line was built over New Utrecht Avenue, 86th Street and Stillwell Avenue, replacing the surface railway.

The platforms were extended in the 1950s to accommodate the current standard B Division train length of 615 feet (187 m).

In the 1980s, this station was adopted by students of Lafayette High School as part of New York City Transit's "Adopt a Station" program.

In 2012, the station was rehabilitated with funding from the American Recovery and Reinvestment Act of 2009.

The 2012 artwork at this station is Rediscovery by Amy Cheng. It is composed of four laminated glass windscreens of imaginary land- and skyscapes. In summer 2025, the station received a Re-NEW-Vation.

== Station layout ==
This elevated station has three tracks and two side platforms. The center express track is not normally used. Both platforms have beige windscreens and brown canopies with green frames and support columns in the center and high mesh fences at either ends. The station signs are in the standard black plates with white lettering. This station has four stairs to the street and one from the mezzanine to each platform.

=== Exits ===
The station's only exits are from a mezzanine beneath the tracks. From there, stairways lead to all four corners of 86th Street and 25th Avenue.

== In popular culture ==
The station was pictured in the 1971 film The French Connection.
