= 18th Avenue station (BMT West End Line) =

New York City Subway station in Brooklyn

18 Avenue
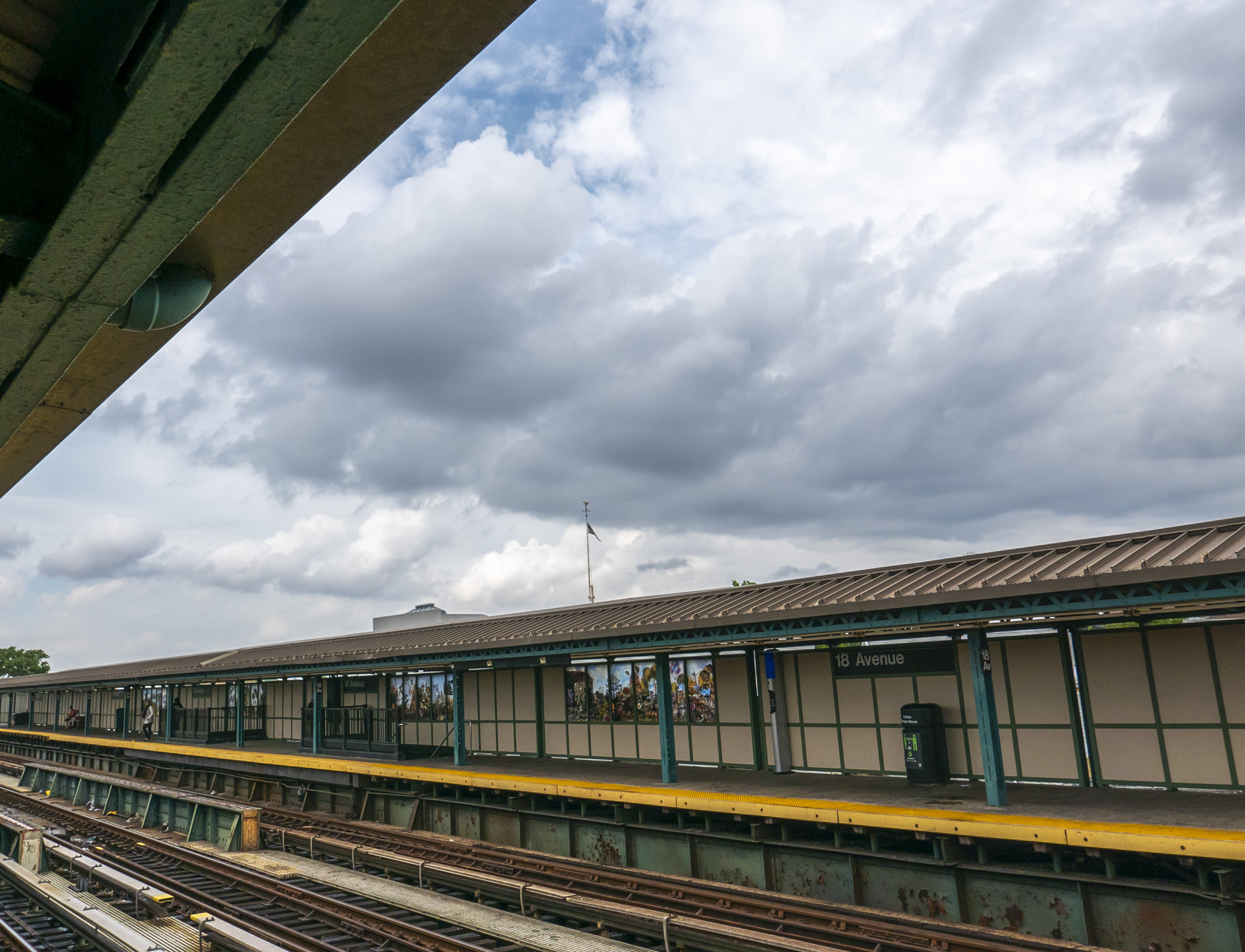
- View of northbound platform

Station statistics
- Address: 18th Avenue & New Utrecht Avenue; Brooklyn, New York
- Borough: Brooklyn
- Locale: Bensonhurst
- Coordinates: 40.608667°N 74.002115°W
- Division: B (BMT)
- Line: BMT West End Line
- Services: D (all times)
- Transit: NYCT Bus: B1, B8
- Structure: Elevated
- Platforms: 2 side platforms
- Tracks: 3 (2 in regular service)

Other information
- Opened: June 24, 1916 (110 years ago)
- Accessible: No; planned

Traffic
- 2025: 1,434,357 ▲3.1%
- Rank: 235 out of 423
Services
Preceding station	New York City Subway	Following station
79th Street toward Norwood–205th Street	Local	20th Avenue toward Coney Island–Stillwell Avenue
and do not stop here
Location
Location within New York City Subway
Location within New York City
Location within New York
Track layout
Street map
Station service legend
Symbol	Description
Stops all times	Stops all times

The 18th Avenue station is a local station on BMT West End Line of the New York City Subway in Bensonhurst, Brooklyn. It is served by the D train at all times. The station opened in 1916 as part of the BMT West End Line, which was upgraded into an elevated line as part of the Dual Contracts. Its platforms were extended to accommodate ten-car trains in the 1960s, and the station was renovated in 2012. The station is scheduled to become compliant with the Americans with Disabilities Act of 1990 through the installation of elevators.

== History ==
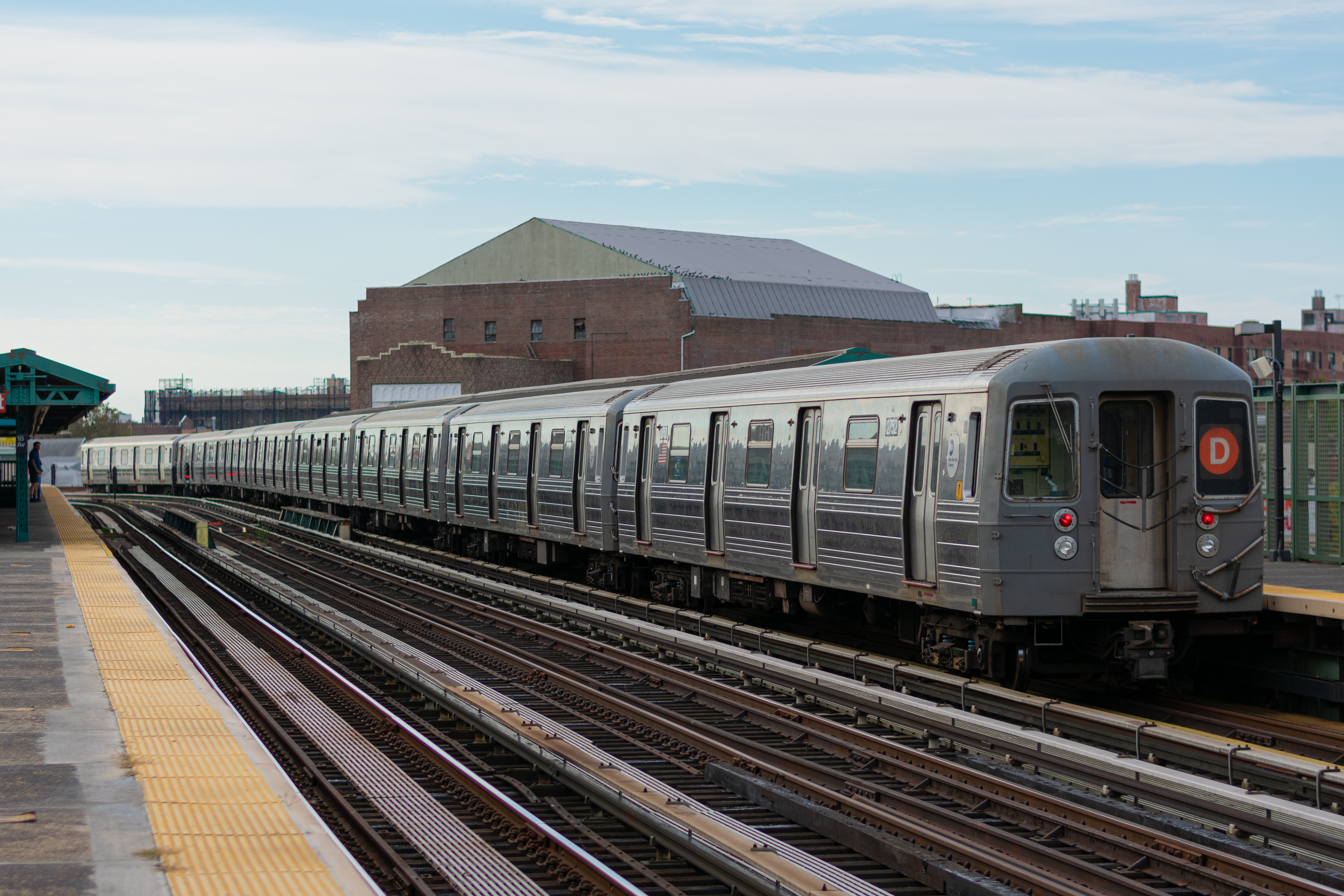
R68 D train leaving the station

=== Construction and opening ===
The 18th Avenue station opened on June 24, 1916, as the terminal of the first portion of the BMT West End Line, which extended from 36th Street on the BMT Fourth Avenue Line. The line was originally a surface excursion railway to Coney Island, called the Brooklyn, Bath and Coney Island Railroad, which was established in 1862, but did not reach Coney Island until 1864. Under the Dual Contracts of 1913, an elevated line was built over New Utrecht Avenue, 86th Street and Stillwell Avenue. The section of the West End Line between 62nd Street and this station originally opened with only one track in service. The second track between 62nd Street and 18th Avenue opened on July 8, 1916.

=== Renovations ===
The platforms were extended in the 1960s to accommodate the current standard B Division train length of 615 feet (187 m).

In 2012, the station was rehabilitated with funding from the American Recovery and Reinvestment Act of 2009.

In 2019, the Metropolitan Transportation Authority announced that this station would become compliant with the Americans with Disabilities Act of 1990 through the installation of elevators as part of the agency's 2020–2024 Capital Program. The project was to be funded by congestion pricing in New York City, but it was postponed in June 2024 after the implementation of congestion pricing was delayed. However, after congestion pricing was approved, the MTA announced that the elevator installations would proceed. In July 2026, the Metropolitan Transportation Authority announced plans for accessibility renovations at five subway stations in Brooklyn. The 18th Avenue station would receive two elevators.

== Station layout ==
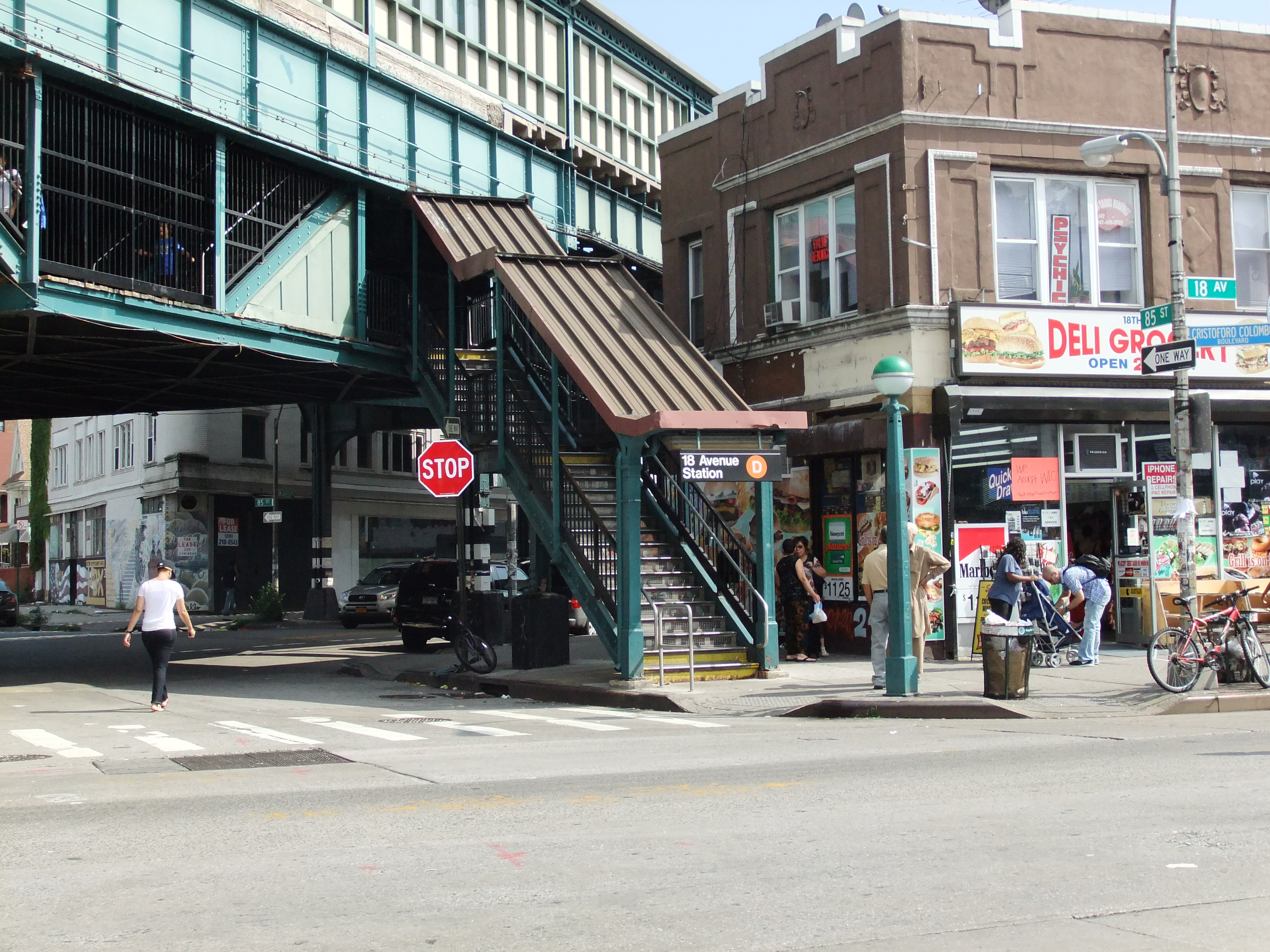
Southeastern stair

This elevated station has three tracks and two side platforms. The center express track is not normally used. The station is situated in between two curves and the platforms have been extended to the north on both sides.

Both platforms have beige windscreens along their entire length and brown canopies with green frames and support columns in the center. The exposed section of the platforms have black, full-height lampposts at regular intervals. The station signs feature the standard black station name plate with white lettering.

The 2012 artwork here is called Bensonhurst Gardens by Francesco Simeti. It features laminated glass windows on the platform windscreens, depicting imaginary flowery landscapes.

=== Exits ===
There is a single mezzanine with three stairs to the street (two to the northeast corner of 18th Avenue and 85th Street, and one to the southeast corner) as well as two to each platform.

== In popular culture ==
Some exterior scenes of the 1991 Steven Seagal film Out for Justice were shot outside this station.
