= Bensonhurst, Brooklyn =

Neighborhood in New York City

Bensonhurst
- Neighborhood of Brooklyn
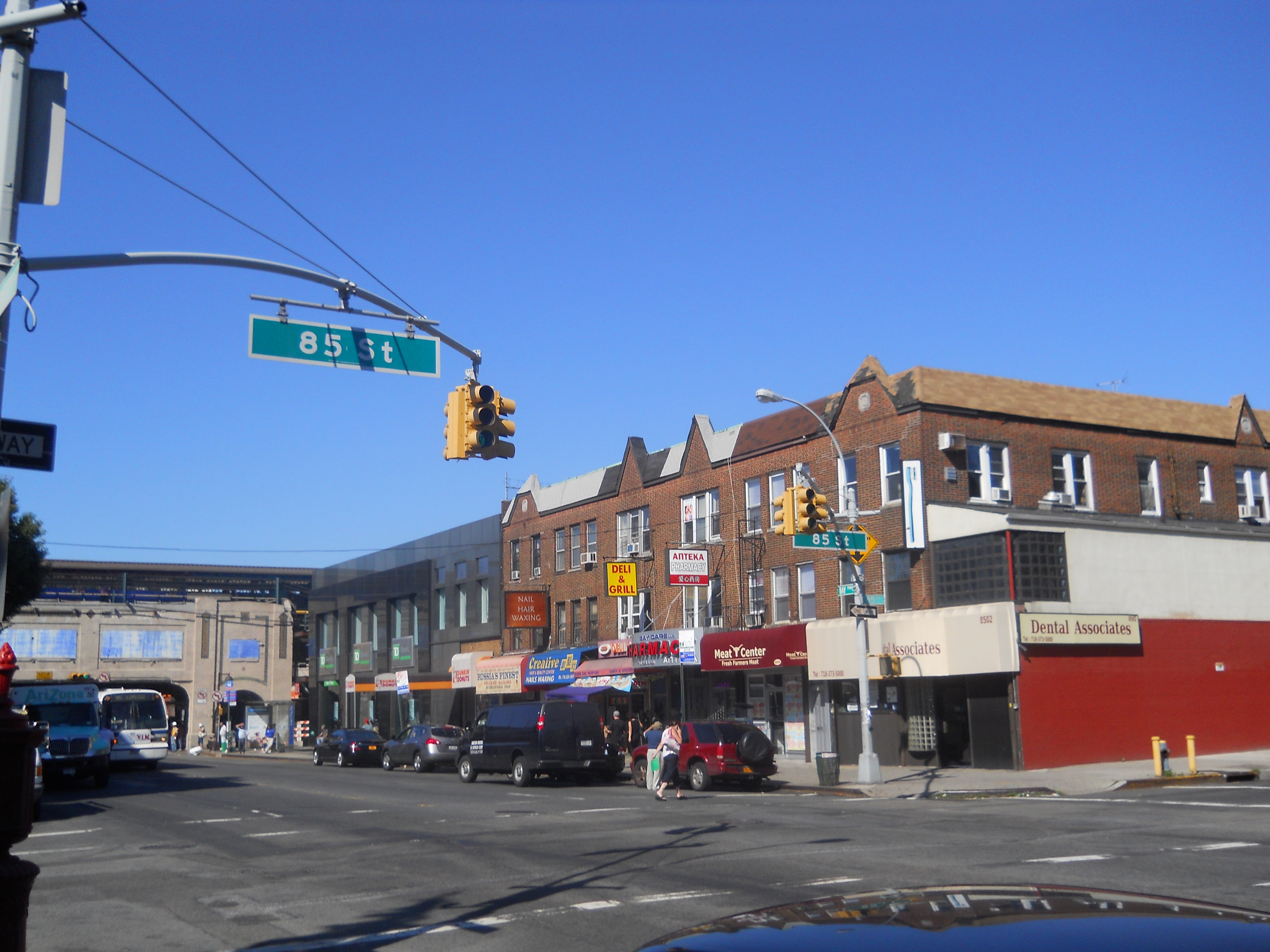
- Bay Parkway in Bensonhurst
- Etymology: Egbert Benson
- Interactive map of Bensonhurst
- Coordinates: 40.603°N 74.002°W
- Country: United States
- State: New York
- City: New York City
- Borough: Brooklyn
- Community District: Brooklyn 11

Area
  - Total: 7.6 km^{2} (2.95 sq mi)

Population (2020)
  - Total: 104,934
  - Density: 13,700/km^{2} (35,600/sq mi)

Ethnicity
  - Asian: 43.9%
  - White: 34.8%
  - Hispanic: 17.2%
  - Black: 1.0%
  - Other: 2.5%

Economics
  - Median income: $51,667
- Time zone: UTC−5 (Eastern)
  - Summer (DST): UTC−4 (EDT)
- ZIP Codes: 11204, 11214
- Area code: 718, 347, 929, and 917
- Website: www.bensonhurst.nyc

Bensonhurst is a residential neighborhood in the southwestern section of the New York City borough of Brooklyn. The neighborhood is bordered on the northwest by 14th Avenue, on the northeast by 60th Street, on the southeast by Avenue P and 22nd Avenue (Bay Parkway) and on the southwest by 86th Street. It is adjacent to the neighborhoods of Dyker Heights to the northwest, Borough Park and Mapleton to the northeast, Bath Beach to the southwest, and Gravesend to the southeast.

Bensonhurst contains several major ethnic enclaves. It was traditionally known as a Little Italy of Brooklyn. Bensonhurst today is home to Brooklyn's second Chinatown and has the largest population of residents born in China and Hong Kong of any neighborhood in New York City. The neighborhood accounts for 9.5% of the 330,000 Chinese-born residents of the city, based on data from 2007 to 2011.

Bensonhurst is part of Brooklyn Community District 11, and its primary ZIP Codes are 11204 and 11214. It is patrolled by the 62nd Precinct of the New York City Police Department. Politically it is represented by the New York City Council's 38th, 43rd, and 47th Districts.

== Etymology and history ==
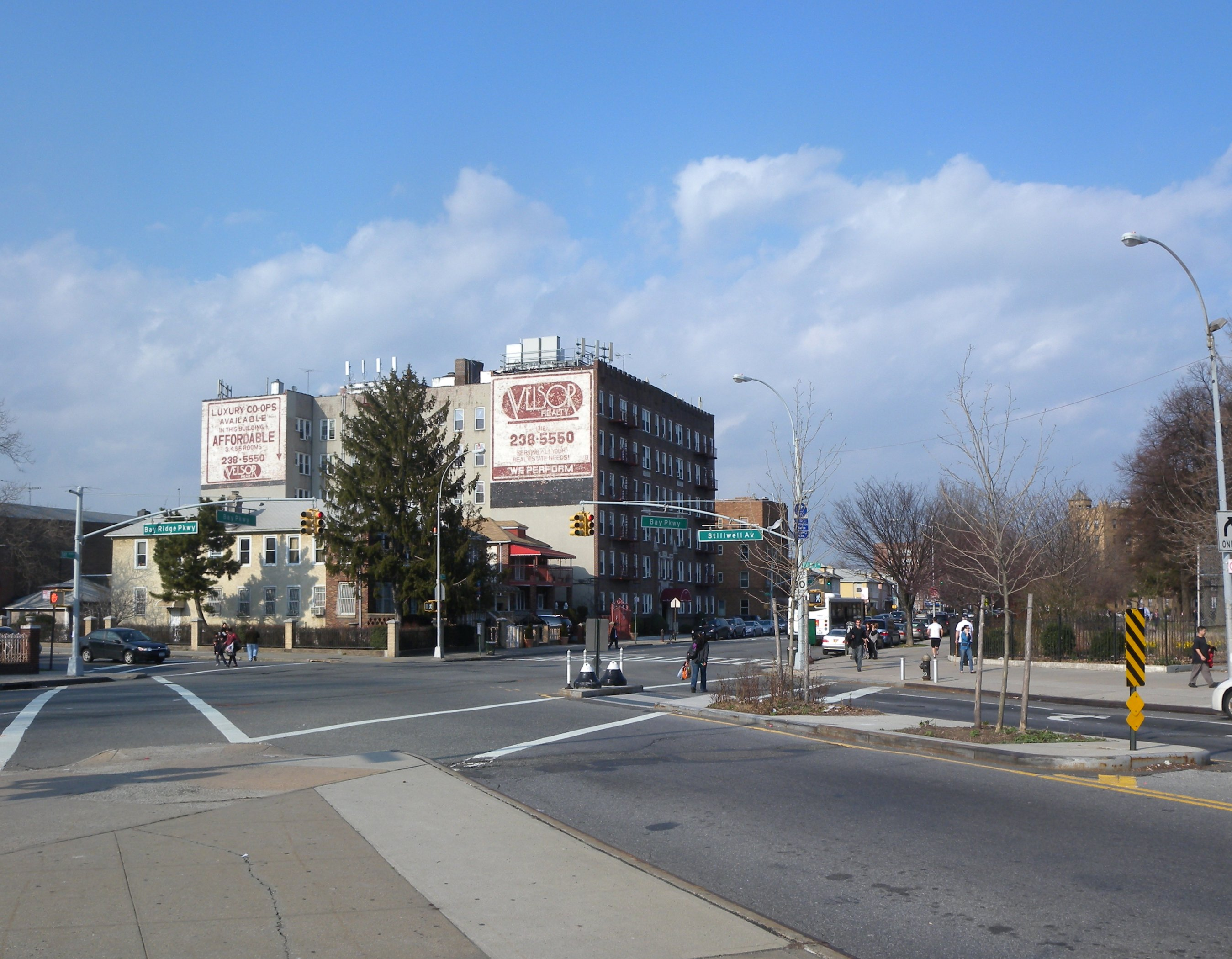
Stillwell Avenue at Bay Parkway and Bay Ridge Parkway

Bensonhurst derives its name from Egbert Benson (1789–1866), whose children and grandchildren sold his lands to James D. Lynch, a New York real estate developer. Lynch bought the old farmlands from the Benson family in the mid-1880s, and by 1888, began selling private lots in an area dubbed as Bensonhurst-by-the-Sea, now Bath Beach. The first sale of lands in "The New Seaside Resort" area was advertised in the July 24, 1888, issue of the Brooklyn Daily Eagle.

Through the mid-20th century, Bensonhurst developed as an Italian and Jewish enclave. Despite a wave of commercial development in the 1980s, some land had remained undeveloped by then. By the early 2000s, condominiums were being built in Bensonhurst, and it had turned into a diverse community of Italian, Chinese, Mexican, Middle Eastern, and Russian residents. The neighborhood, along with adjoining neighborhoods have been called "Brooklyn's Chinatown".

== Demographics ==
Based on data from the 2020 United States census, the population of Bensonhurst was 104,934, Covering an area of 1,890.81 acres (765.18 ha), the neighborhood had a population density of 75.7 inhabitants per acre (48,400/sq mi; 18,700/km^{2}).

The racial makeup of the neighborhood was 43.9% (43,064) Asian, 34.8% (36,545) White, 1.0% (1,078) African American, 0.6% (600) from other races, and 2.5% (2,613) from two or more races. Hispanics or Latinos of any race were 17.2% (18,064) of the population.

The entirety of Community Board 11 had 204,829 inhabitants as of NYC Health's 2018 Community Health Profile, with an average life expectancy of 83.8 years. This is higher than the median life expectancy of 81.2 for all New York City neighborhoods. Most inhabitants are middle-aged adults and youth: 20% are between the ages of 0–17, 31% between 25 and 44, and 26% between 45 and 64. The ratio of college-aged and elderly residents was lower, at 8% and 15% respectively.

As of 2016, the median household income in Community District 11 was $53,493. In 2018, an estimated 23% of Bensonhurst residents lived in poverty, compared to 21% in all of Brooklyn and 20% in all of New York City. Less than one in ten residents (8%) were unemployed, compared to 9% in the rest of both Brooklyn and New York City. Rent burden, or the percentage of residents who have difficulty paying their rent, is 52% in Bensonhurst, about the same as the citywide and boroughwide rates of 52% and 51% respectively. Based on this calculation, as of 2018, Bensonhurst is considered to be low-income and not gentrifying relative to the rest of the city.

As of the 2020 census data from NYC Dept. Of City Planning, there were 46,000 Asian residents surpassing the remaining White residents of 30,000 to 39,999 for the first time in history. The Hispanic population has also grown significantly to between 10,000 and 19,999 residents.

== Ethnic enclaves ==
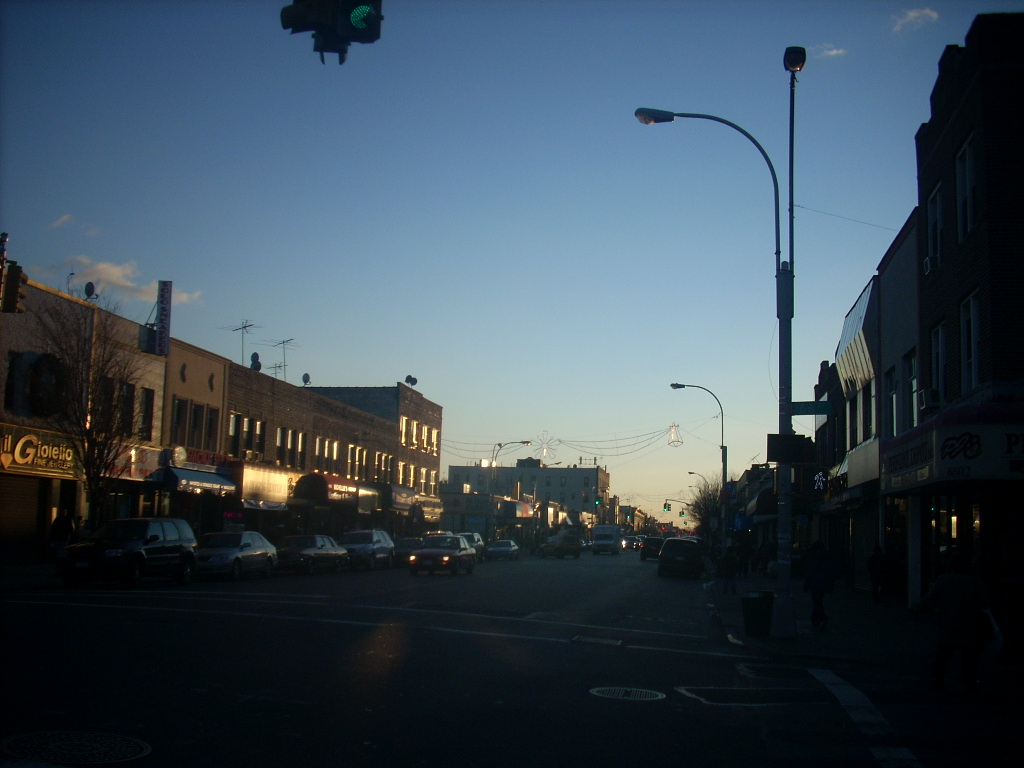
18th Ave and 66th St

In the early 20th century, many Italians and Jewish migrants moved into the neighborhood, and prior to World War II, the neighborhood was about equally Jewish and Italian. In the 1940s an influx of immigrants from southern Italy moved in, leaving the area predominantly Italian.

Around 1989, an influx of immigrants from China and the former USSR began to arrive, mainly from Southern China, Russia, and Ukraine. In the 1990s, Bensonhurst rapidly grew in cultural diversity. Bensonhurst is home to many ethnic Polish, Ukrainian, Russian, Albanian, Georgian, Uzbek, Tajik, Arab, Egyptian, Pakistani, Mexican, and Guatemalan Americans. In 1994, The New York Times cited the growing influx of Russian-speaking, Asian, and Hispanic populations in the area.

In 2000, the New York City Department of City Planning determined that just over half of the residents were born in another country. By 2013, then-Mayor Michael Bloomberg announced that the city's foreign-born population had reached a record high, and that Bensonhurst had the city's second-highest number of foreign-born people with 77,700 foreign-born immigrants in the neighborhood, just after Washington Heights.

=== Little Italy ===
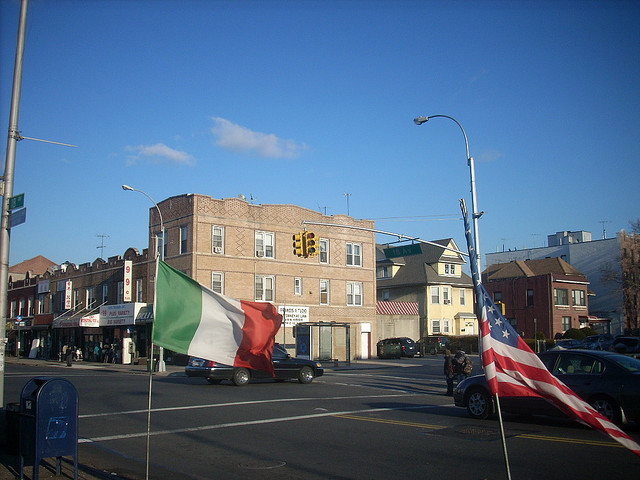
18th Avenue and Bay Ridge Parkway

With a large Italian-American population, Bensonhurst is usually considered the main "Little Italy" of Brooklyn. The Italian-speaking community was over 20,000 strong in the census of 2000. The Italian-speaking community, though, is becoming "increasingly elderly and isolated, with the small, tight-knit enclave in the city slowly disappearing as they give way to demographic changes." Despite changing demographics over the recent years, Bensonhurst is home to the largest Italian speaking community outside of Italy and is home to the largest Sicilian and Neapolitan speaking communities outside of Sicily and Naples, respectively.

Its main thoroughfare, 18th Avenue (also known as Cristoforo Colombo Boulevard) between roughly 60th Street and Shore Parkway, is lined with predominantly small, Italian family-owned businesses—many of which have remained in the same family for several generations. 86th Street is another popular local thoroughfare, located under the elevated BMT West End Line.

After Italy's World Cup victory in 2006, over 50,000 flocked to 18th Avenue for an all-day party.

The annual Festa di Santa Rosalia (commonly known as "the Feast" to locals), is held on 18th Avenue from Bay Ridge Parkway (75th Street) to 66th Street in late August or early September. "The Feast" is presented by Bensonhurst resident and marketer Franco Corrado, as well as by the Santa Rosalia Society, on 18th Avenue. Born in Rome in 1955, Corrado has been an active social member of the Italian-American community for the past 20 years. St. Rosalia is the patron saint of the city of Palermo and is sometimes venerated as the patron for the entire island of Sicily. The annual end-of-summer celebration attracts thousands. Bensonhurst also hosts a Columbus Day parade.

Like Lower Manhattan's Little Italy, Bensonhurst's Little Italy and its Italian-American population is declining, with the rapid expansion of its Chinatown and Chinese population.

In the 2020 United States Census, Italian-Americans constituted 9.2% of the population of Bensonhurst.

=== Little Hong Kong/Little Guangdong ===
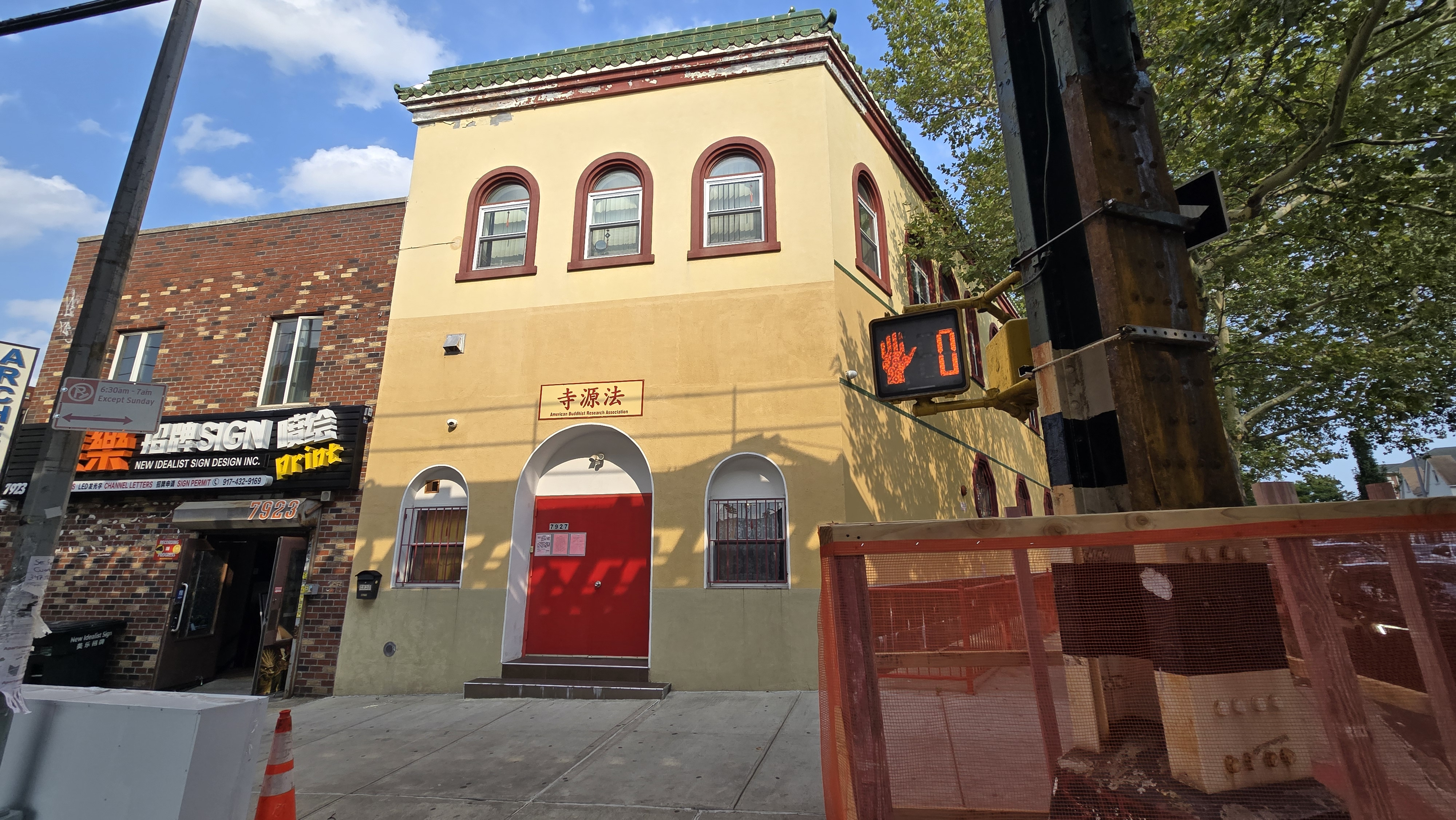
Buddhist temple in Bensonhurst, Brooklyn

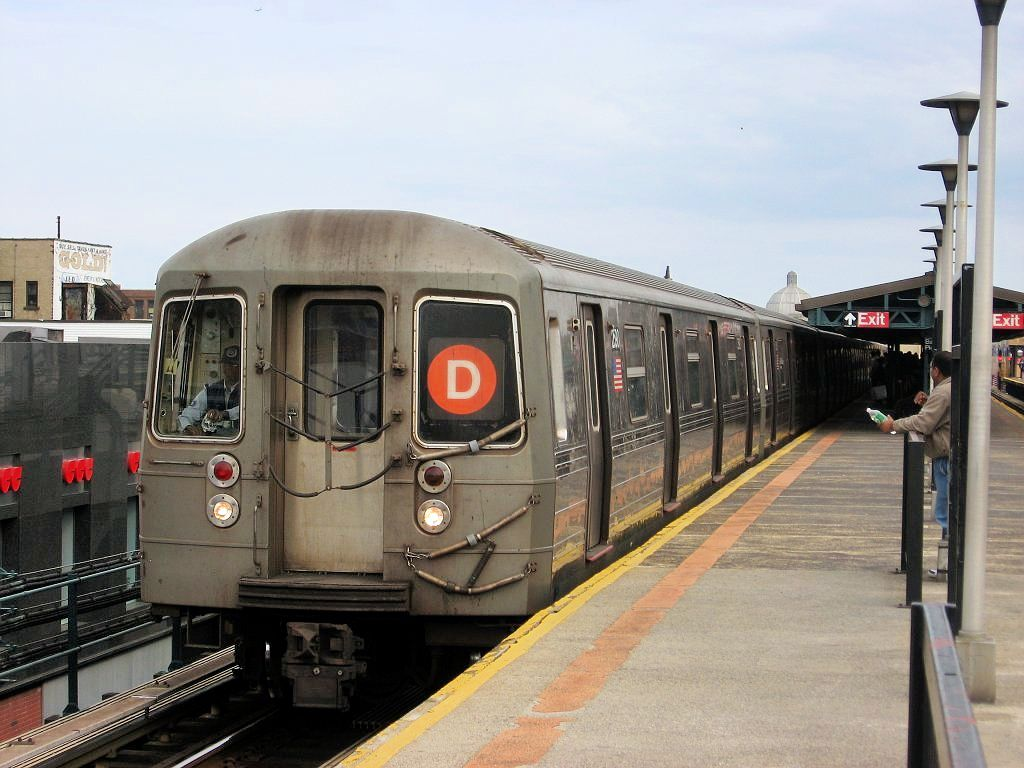
The D, R, and W trains of the New York City Subway system connects Brooklyn's Bensonhurst Chinatown to Manhattan's Chinatown.

Below the West End Line, served by the D, R, and W trains along 86th Street between 18th Avenue and the intersection with Stillwell Avenue, is a rapidly growing Brooklyn Chinatown. In the 2000s it was intermixed with Italian, Jewish, and Russian residents, but in the 2010s, most of the new businesses between 18th Avenue and 25th Avenue, have been Chinese. 86th Street is home to a growing number of Chinese restaurants, including the 86 Wong Chinese Restaurant (one of the earliest Chinese businesses established in Bensonhurst), as well as Chinese grocery stores, salons, bakeries, and other types of businesses. The subway directly connects to Manhattan's Chinatown, and indirectly to the Chinatown in Sunset Park, which is served by the N and W trains at the 8th Avenue station.

With the large migration of the Cantonese and some Fuzhouese people in Brooklyn now to Bensonhurst, as well as new Chinese immigration, other clusters of Chinese businesses and residences have also started to emerge in other parts of Bensonhurst such as 18th Avenue and Bay Parkway, creating other newer small emerging Chinatowns in Bensonhurst in addition to the one on 86th Street under the D train. These are connected to the Sunset Park Chinatown by the N and W trains.

The newly emerging Chinese enclaves in sections of Bensonhurst, and another one in Homecrest/Sheepshead Bay, are primarily Cantonese populated and are more of extensions of the Western Cantonese section of Manhattan's Chinatown or Little Hong Kong / Little Guangdong or Cantonese Town. However, there are also small numbers are Fuzhou- and Mandarin-speakers.

The Flushing-based New World Mall, which owns and operates a Chinese supermarket called Jmart Supermarket inside their shopping center, opened a second branch of Jmart Supermarket in Bensonhurst in 2018. It is the neighborhood's largest Chinese Asian style supermarket. The Jmart is located in a former Waldbaum's.

Bensonhurst's Chinese population was 31,658 in 2015, with this population being primarily Cantonese-speaking from Mainland China's Guangdong Province and Hong Kong. The majority of Brooklyn's Cantonese population is concentrated in Bensonhurst, and is slowly replacing Manhattan's Chinatown as the largest primary Cantonese cultural center in New York City resulting in Bensonhurst increasingly becoming the main largest attraction for newly arriving Cantonese immigrants into New York City with Homecrest/Sheepshead Bay as a smaller secondary attraction.

In 2011, the New York Daily News reported that Manhattan's Chinatown Chinese population dropped from 34,554 to 28,681 from 2000 to 2010, and that it is continuing to decline due to the gentrification going on in Lower Manhattan, which has spurred the increasing growth of newer Chinatowns in Brooklyn including in Queens. As of the 2010s, the current Chinese population in Bensonhurst has grown so much that it is enough to create another large Chinatown surpassing Manhattan's Chinatown and nearly being as big as Sunset Park's Chinatown. However, unlike in Sunset Park where the Chinese community is highly concentrated, the Chinese community in Bensonhurst is split into several sections, such as 18th Avenue, Bay Parkway, and 86th Street.

Brooklyn's Asian population, mainly Chinese, has grown substantially in the Sunset Park area, as well as in Bensonhurst, Dyker Heights, and Borough Park. In Bensonhurst alone, from 2000 to 2010, the Asian population increased by 57%. The study showed that Asians very often live in houses that are divided into studio apartments, which means the Asian population could be higher than indicated on censuses.

Based on data from the 2020 United States census, the Asian population in Bensonhurst grew to 46,000, surpassing the Asian populations in Sunset Park of 31,000 and in the original Manhattan's Chinatown of 27,000. Bensonhurst has the third-largest Asian population of any New York City neighborhood, behind Elmhurst with a population in excess of 55,000 and Flushing with 54,000. While the original Chinatown in Manhattan saw a decline in the Asian population, all these other neighborhoods have continued to experience Asian population increases.

For the first time as of the 2020 census data from NYC Dept. Of City Planning, the Asian population(46,000 residents) in Bensonhurst now constitute a more than 50% majority in the neighborhood now surpassing the remaining White population (30,000 to 39,999 residents). Nearby adjacent neighborhoods of Gravesend has 26,700 Asian residents and Dyker Heights has between 20,000 and 29,999 Asian residents and Bath Beach has between 10,000 and 19,999 Asian residents. The Asian population in the Dyker Heights/Bensonhurst/Gravesend/Bath Beach area all together approximately made up around roughly 102,700 residents more or less and remain primarily Chinese speaking.

There is a small significant amount of Vietnamese Chinese residents integrated into the community, particularly west of Bay Parkway going towards Dyker Heights.

Chinese translation terms Bensonhurst as 本森社区.

On October 2, 2026, on the corner of 86th Street and Bay Parkway, there was a celebration from the Cantonese community to celebrate the reveal of a co naming on this corner called Canton Avenue. It is to honor the early Cantonese immigrants that came to the US to help build the Transcontinental railroad during the 1800s and to recognize Bensonhurst as the largest Cantonese cultural center of NYC. NYC Council person Susan Zhuang representing the 43rd district in the southern part of Brooklyn is the one who advocated for this along with other Chinese leaders.

==== New York City's largest Hong Kong community ====
Bensonhurst and the nearby neighborhood of Bath Beach collectively have the largest concentration of Hong Kong immigrants in New York City.

== Land use and terrain ==
Many of Bensonhurst's houses are attached or semidetached, though fully detached houses can be found in the west near Dyker Heights. These are mostly 20th-century houses made of brick, stucco, and stone, with aluminum siding facades. There are also clusters of apartment buildings throughout the neighborhood. After rezoning in the 2000s, many short single-family homes were torn down and replaced by three-story brick apartment buildings and multi-family condominiums.

They are sometimes called "Fedders Houses" for their distinctive, standard air conditioner sleeves. From 2002 to 2005, 1,200 new housing units in Bensonhurst were approved to accommodate the growing population, which includes many foreign-born residents. With an increase in the area's real estate values, long-time homeowners sold their houses.

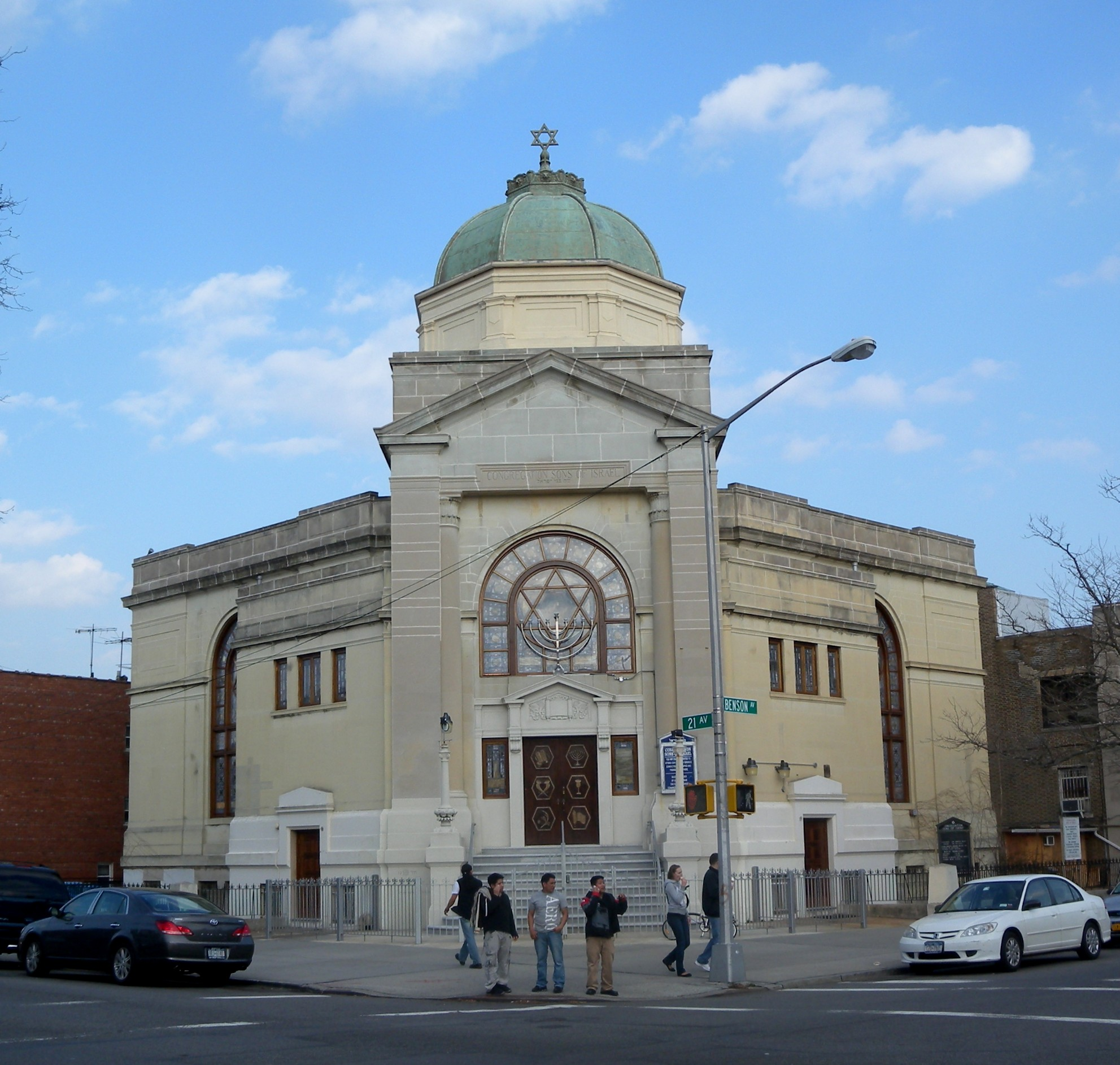
Sons of Israel Synagogue

As no official neighborhood designations are used in New York City, Bensonhurst does not have any official boundaries. Still, parts of Bath Beach, Mapleton, Dyker Heights, Gravesend, and Borough Park are sometimes considered parts of Bensonhurst. However, Bensonhurst-proper includes the area bounded by 86th Street, 14th Avenue, 60th Street, McDonald Avenue, Avenue P, Stillwell Ave. and Bay Parkway.

== Police and crime ==
The NYPD's 62nd Precinct is located at 1925 Bath Avenue.

The 62nd Precinct ranked 4th safest out of 69 patrol areas for per-capita crime in 2010. Historically, Bensonhurst has had lower crime than other neighborhoods in Brooklyn, though its mostly White and Asian population has made the area susceptible to racially motivated crimes, such as the murder of Yusef Hawkins in 1989.

As of 2018, with a non-fatal assault rate of 23 per 100,000 people, Bensonhurst's rate of violent crimes per capita is less than that of the city as a whole. The incarceration rate of 152 per 100,000 people is lower than that of the city as a whole.

The Precinct has a lower crime rate than in the 1990s, with crimes across all categories having decreased by 87.4% between 1990 and 2018. The precinct reported 2 murders, 20 rapes, 120 robberies, 148 felony assaults, 178 burglaries, 482 grand larcenies, and 67 grand larcenies auto in 2018.

== Fire safety ==
The New York City Fire Department (FDNY) operates two firehouses in the area. Engine Co. 330/Ladder Co. 172 is located at 2312 65th Street. Engine Co. 253 is located at 2429 86th Street.

== Health ==
As of 2018, preterm births and births to teenage mothers are less common in Bensonhurst than in other places citywide. In Bensonhurst, there were 84 preterm births per 1,000 live births (compared to 87 per 1,000 citywide), and 12.5 births to teenage mothers per 1,000 live births (compared to 19.3 per 1,000 citywide). Bensonhurst has a high population of residents who are uninsured, or who receive healthcare through Medicaid. In 2018, this population of uninsured residents was estimated to be 13%, which is higher than the citywide rate of 12%.

The concentration of fine particulate matter, the deadliest type of air pollutant, in Bensonhurst is 0.007 milligrams per cubic metre (7.0×10^{−9} oz/ft^{3}), lower than the citywide and boroughwide averages. Sixteen percent of Bensonhurst residents are smokers, which is higher the city average of 14% of residents being smokers. In Bensonhurst, 21% of residents are obese, 12% are diabetic, and 16% have high blood pressure—compared to the citywide averages of 24%, 11%, and 28% respectively. 14% of local children are obese, compared to the citywide average of 20%.

Ninety percent of residents eat some fruits and vegetables every day, which is slightly higher than the city's average of 87%. In 2018, 65% of residents described their health as "good", "very good", or "excellent", less than the city's average of 78%. For every supermarket in Bensonhurst, there are 27 bodegas.

The Bay Ridge/Dyker Heights/Bensonhurst area does not have any hospitals. However, the Coney Island Hospital, NYU Langone Hospital – Brooklyn, and Maimonides Medical Center are located in nearby neighborhoods.

== Post offices and ZIP Codes ==
Bensonhurst is covered by ZIP Codes 11204 north of Bay Ridge Parkway, and 11214 south of Bay Ridge Parkway. The United States Postal Service's Parkville Station is located at 6618 20th Avenue. It was listed on the National Register of Historic Places in 1988. Another post office, the Bath Beach Station, is located at 1865 Benson Avenue.

== Notable current and former landmarks ==
Side view of New Utrecht church and front view of the cemetery

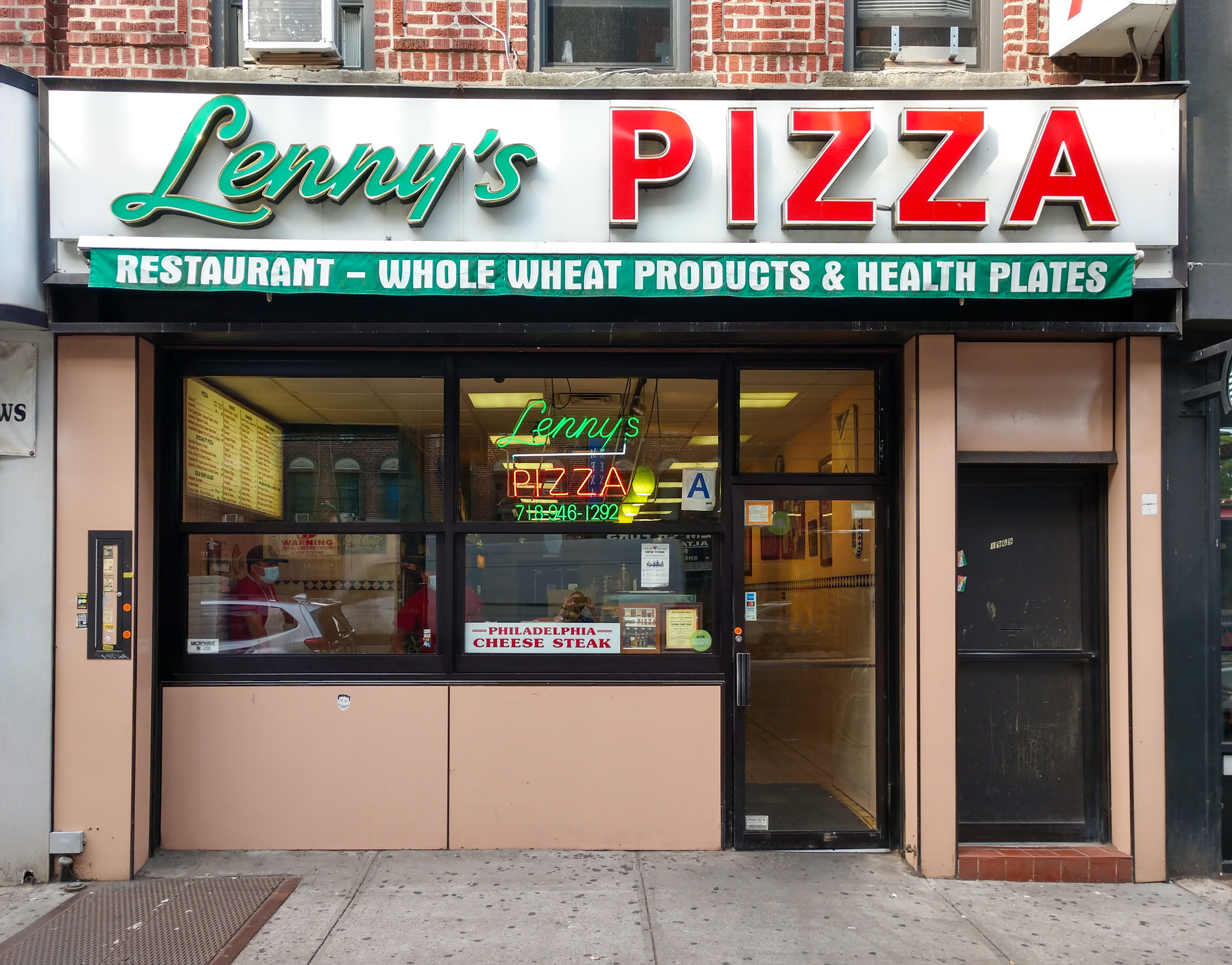
Lenny's Pizza

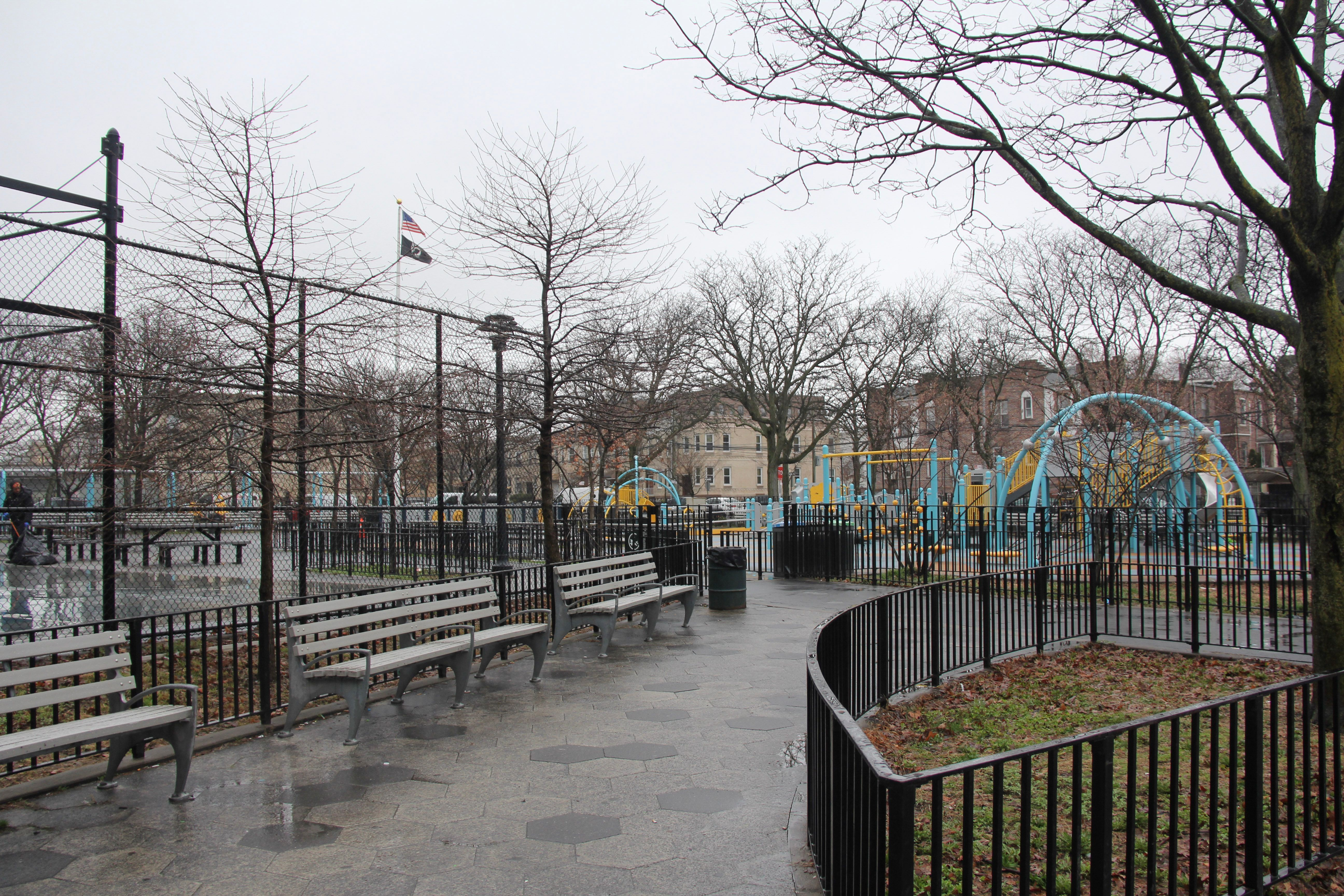
Lieutenant Joseph Petrosino Park, Bensonhurst

Bensonhurst Park, a Public Park located in the center of the neighborhood.
- Magen David Synagogue
- The Historical New Utrecht Church (serving the community since 1677) is the fourth-oldest Reformed Church in America.
- Lenny's Pizza, made famous by John Travolta in the opening sequence of Saturday Night Fever, closed in February 2023 after 70 years in business.

=== Parks ===
- Milestone Park is a significant park in the Bensonhurst area. It contains a replica of the oldest sandstone mile marker in New York City (the original is housed at the Brooklyn Historical Society).
- Bensonhurst Park
- Adventurers Amusement Park, a small amusement park on the waterfront
- Seth Low Park
- Lt. Joseph Petrosino Park (formerly Satellite Park)

== Education ==
Bensonhurst generally has a lower ratio of college-educated residents than the rest of the city as of 2018. While 36% of residents age 25 and older have a college education or higher, 26% have less than a high school education and 38% are high school graduates or have some college education. By contrast, 40% of Brooklynites and 38% of city residents have a college education or higher. The percentage of Bensonhurst students excelling in math has been increasing, with math achievement rising from 50 percent in 2000 to 71 percent in 2011, though reading achievement within the same time period stayed steady at 52%.

Bensonhurst's rate of elementary school student absenteeism is lower than the rest of New York City. In Bensonhurst, 12% of elementary school students missed twenty or more days per school year, compared to the citywide average of 20% of students. 85% of high school students in Bensonhurst graduate on time, higher than the citywide average of 75% of students.

=== Schools ===
The New York City Department of Education serves Bensonhurst.

Zoned schools include:

- PS 748 The Brooklyn School for Global Scholars
- PS 200 Benson School
- PS 112 Lefferts Park School
- PS 186 Dr. Irving A Gladstone School
- PS 48 The Mapleton School
- PS 205 The Clarion School
- PS 101 The Verrazano School
- PS 204 The Vince Lombardi School
- PS 128 Bensonhurst School
- PS 247 The College Partnership Elementary School
- PS 177 The Marlboro
- PS/IS 226 Alfred De B Mason School
- PS/IS 686 Brooklyn School of Inquiry
- PS 313 The Detective Wenjian Liu School of Civics and Entrepreneurship
- PS 464
- Success Academy Bensonhurst
- IS 96 Seth Low
- IS 281 Joseph B. Cavallaro
- JHS 227 Edward B. Shallow Junior High
- Brooklyn Studio Secondary School

High schools include:

- John Dewey High School
- New Utrecht High School
- Franklin Delano Roosevelt High School
- Lafayette High School

Colleges and Universities

- Bramson ORT College

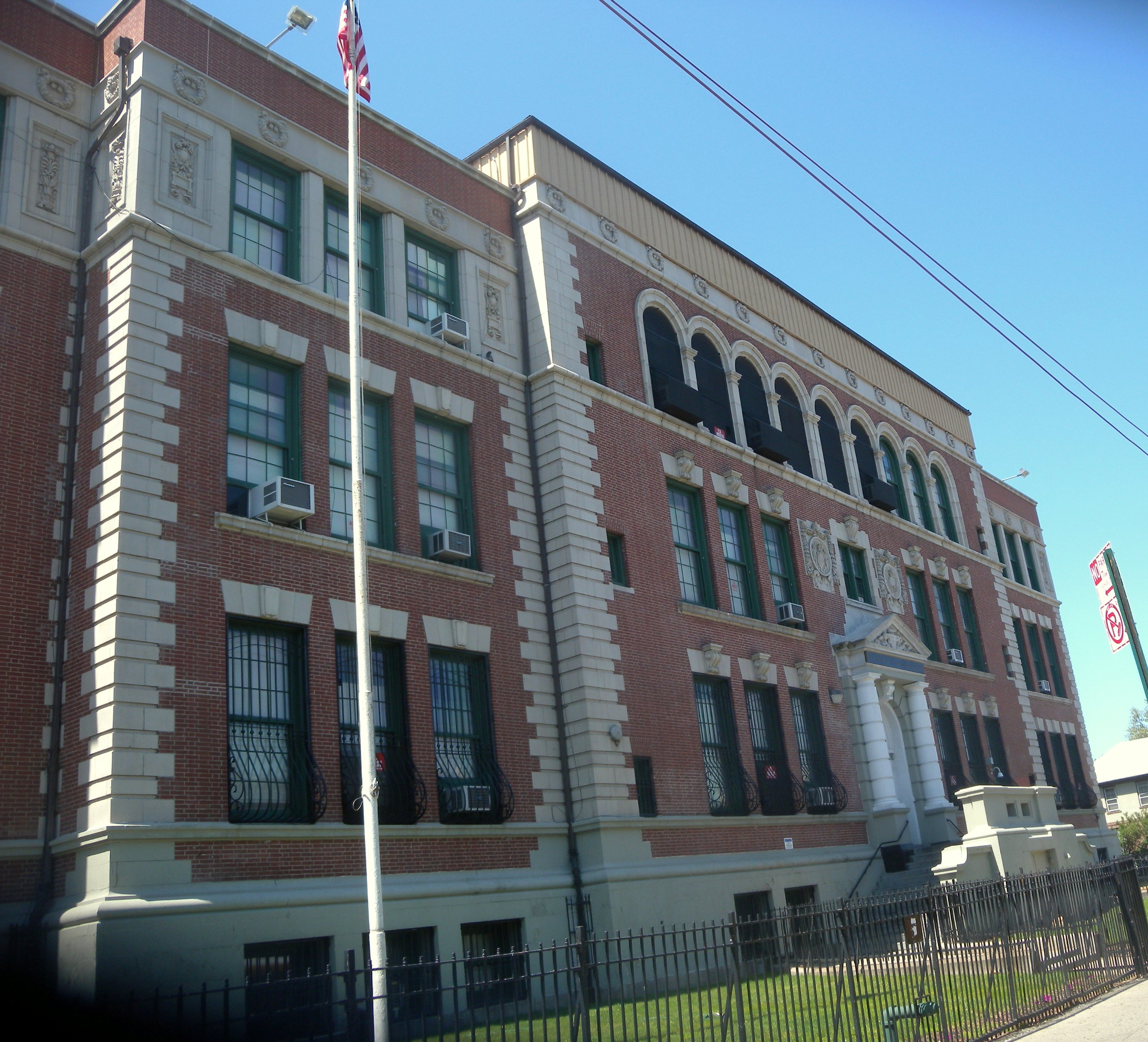
Brooklyn Studio Secondary School

The Roman Catholic Diocese of Brooklyn operates Catholic schools in the borough. Our Lady of Guadalupe School in Bensonhurst was nicknamed "OLG" in the neighborhood. In 2012 the school had 217 students, but by 2019 enrollment was 120. That year its fund balance was $559,633 and its deficit was $215,377. It closed in 2019.

=== Libraries ===
The Brooklyn Public Library (BPL) operates two libraries in Bensonhurst. The Highlawn branch is located at 1664 West 13th Street, near the intersection with Kings Highway. The branch was renovated in 2005–2006. Unlike most other BPL branches, it contains a circular reading room with multicolored walls.

The New Utrecht branch is located at 1743 86th Street, near Bay 17th Street. It was founded in 1894 as the Free Library of the Town of New Utrecht and became a BPL branch in 1901. The current building opened in 1956.

== Transportation ==
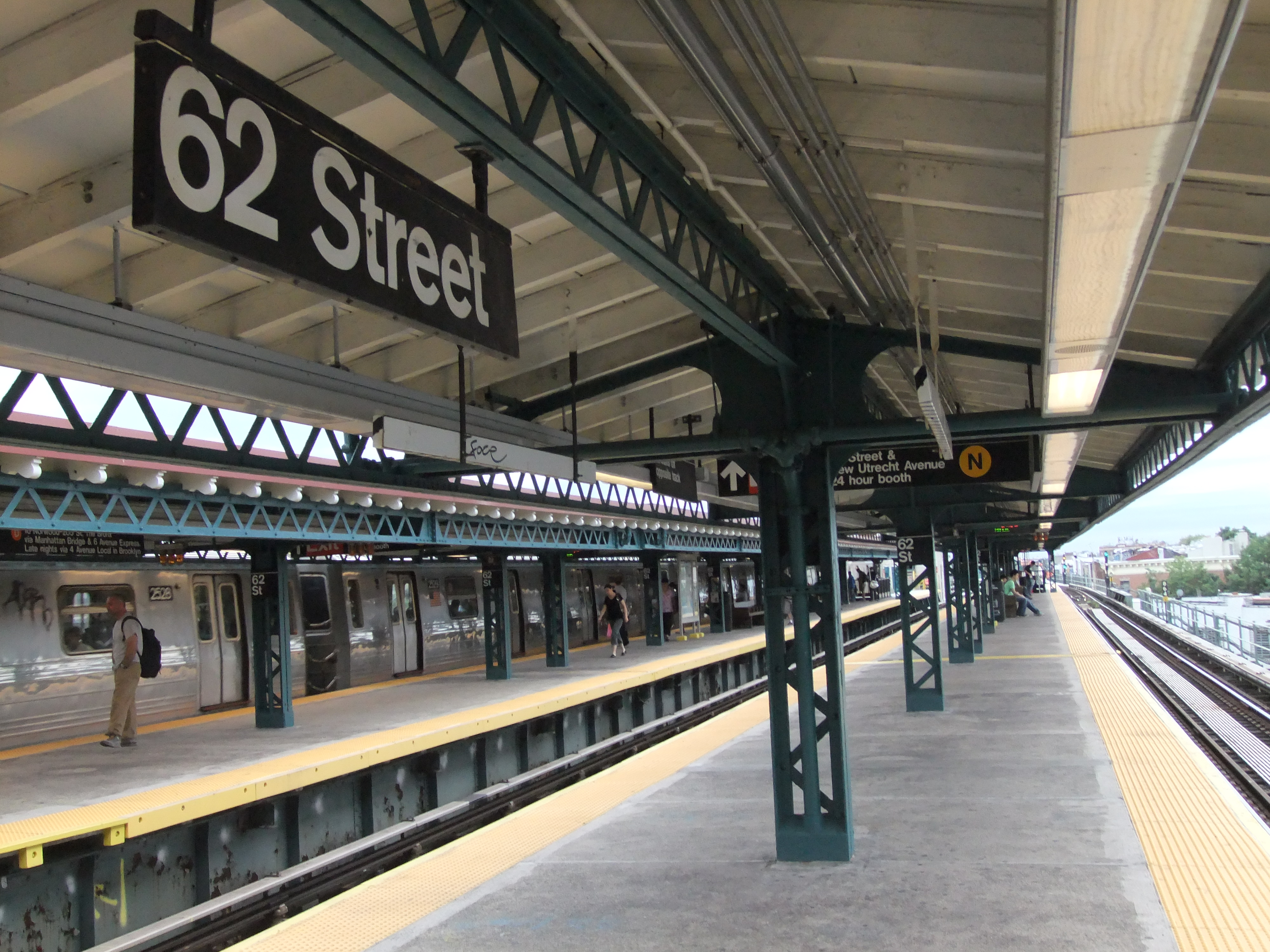
The 62nd Street station platforms

The neighborhood is well served by the New York City Subway. The D, R, and W trains, which runs on the BMT West End Line above 86th Street, provides a direct connection to Grand Street in Manhattan. The N and W trains, which run on the BMT Sea Beach Line near 63rd Street, provide a direct connection to Canal Street. This provides convenient commutes into Manhattan's Chinatown for the growing Bensonhurst Chinese population.

The Sea Beach Line has a station at Eighth Avenue in Brooklyn's Sunset Park Chinatown. A transfer to the West End Line is available at New Utrecht Avenue / 62nd Street. The IND Culver Line along McDonald Avenue, carrying the F and <F> trains, runs through the most northeastern end of Bensonhurst between the Bay Parkway and Kings Highway stations.

Subway stations in the neighborhood include:

- 62nd Street, 71st Street, 79th Street, 18th Avenue, 20th Avenue, Bay Parkway, and 25th Avenue, on the D, R, and W trains
- New Utrecht Avenue, 18th Avenue, 20th Avenue, Bay Parkway on the N train
- Avenue N and Avenue P on the F and <F> trains

The B1, B3, B4, B6, B8, B9, B82 and B82 SBS bus routes operate through Bensonhurst.

== In popular culture ==
Bensonhurst has been portrayed frequently in film, art, and literature:

- Bensonhurst was the setting of the television series The Honeymooners
- The 1970s television series, Welcome Back, Kotter was set here.
- Aired 1991–1993 on CBS television, Brooklyn Bridge was set here during 1956–57.
- Jungle Fever
- The Warriors
- The 1972 song "Bensonhurst Blues" was made famous after Oscar Benton released his version of the song.
- The 1991 Steven Seagal action movie Out For Justice took place in the Italian-American neighborhood, where the opening scenes were filmed along 18th Avenue and 86th Street.
- Batman villain Harley Quinn has been established as being from Bensonhurst, going home to visit her family for Christmas in Gotham City Sirens #7. An episode of the animated series named after the character also features her returning to visit her family in Bensonhurst following a falling out with the rest of her crew.
- Several characters from the soap opera General Hospital, most notably Sonny Corinthos, grew up in Bensonhurst.
- The French Connection (1971) took place along 86th Street, most notably its famed car-chase scene.
- Brooklyn 11223, an American reality-TV series about a divided group of friends, has also been filmed in parts of Bensonhurst.
- Mob Wives filmed some scenes in Bensonhurst at the local boxing joint, Evolution Boxing, where Drita D'Avano is trained by Anthony Pezzolanti.
- Spike of Bensonhurst was filmed around Bensonhurst and won a Spirit Award.
- The opening scene of Saturday Night Fever features John Travolta walking down 86th Street and grabbing slices to eat at Lenny's Pizza.
- The title character in the movie The Adventures of Ford Fairlane, played by Andrew Dice Clay, is from Bensonhurst.
- American alternative rock band Red Hot Chili Peppers filmed the music video for their single Go Robot off their 2016 album The Getaway. The music video was inspired by the 1977 movie Saturday Night Fever.
- American hip hop group Public Enemy use the line "First nothing worse, than the mother's pain of a son slain in Bensonhurst" referencing the 1989 murder of Yusef Hawkins in their song "Welcome to the Terrordome" off their 1990 album Fear of a Black Planet.
- The titular character of John Wick: Chapter 3 rides on horseback through 86th Street.

== Notable people ==
Current and former residents of Bensonhurst include:

- Steve Augeri (born 1959), musician
- Rich Aurilia (born 1971), baseball player for the San Francisco Giants
- Scott Baio (born 1960), actor who appeared on TV on Happy Days and its spin-off Joanie Loves Chachi, as well as on Charles in Charge
- Seymour Benzer (1921–2007), physicist, molecular biologist and behavioral geneticist
- Bob Berg (1951–2002), jazz saxophonist
- Julie Bovasso (1930–1991), actress
- Abe Burrows (1910–1985), playwright, writer of Guys and Dolls and Can-Can
- Kerry Butler (born 1971), actress
- Victor Calderone (born 1967), club music DJ and producer
- Jack Catran (1918–2001), industrial designer and linguist
- Vincent D'Onofrio (born 1959), actor Law & Order: Criminal Intent
- Vic Damone (1928–2018), singer
- Millie Deegan (1919–2002), professional baseball player in the All-American Girls Professional Baseball League
- William DeMeo, actor best known for his acting roles in Analyze That, First Kill and The Sopranos
- Perry Farrell (born 1959), musician
- Joey Fatone (born 1977), singer who was a member of boy band 'N Sync
- Anthony Fauci (born 1940), physician and immunologist who has been director of the National Institute of Allergy and Infectious Diseases (NIAID) since 1984
- Jerry Ferrara (born 1979), actor who appeared in the TV series Entourage
- Lou Ferrigno (born 1951), actor born in Bensonhurst known for his TV starring role as the Incredible Hulk
- Daniel Franzese (born 1978), actor who appeared in the film Mean Girls
- Harvey Fierstein (born 1954), actor, playwright, and screenwriter
- Marshall Flaum (1925–2010), documentary filmmaker
- John Franco (born 1960), former New York Mets baseball player
- Jacque Fresco (1916–2017), founder and director of the Venus Project
- Vincent Gardenia (1920–1992), stage, film and television actor
- Daniel Glass (born 1956), music producer
- Gary David Goldberg (1944–2013), television producer
- Leon Goldstein (1932/1933-1999), college administrator who was President of Kingsborough Community College and acting Chancellor of the City University of New York
- Elliott Gould (born 1938), actor
- Philip Habib (1920–1992), diplomat
- Buddy Hackett (1924–2003), comedian
- Kenny Hickey (born 1966), Johnny Kelly (born 1968), and Peter Steele (1962–2010), (rock band Type O Negative)
- Curly Howard (1903–1952), of the Three Stooges
- Moe Howard (1897–1975), of the Three Stooges
- Shemp Howard (1895–1955), of the Three Stooges
- Richard Jeni (1957–2007), comedian
- Skeery Jones (radio producer) for Z100 NY Elvis Duran and the Morning Show)
- Gabe Kaplan (born 1945), actor, comedian and professional poker player
- Sheila Moriber Katz (1943–2023), pathologist who was dean of the Drexel University College of Medicine
- Larry King (1933–2021), talk-show host
- Marvin Kitman (1929–2023), television critic, humorist, author
- Artie Kornfeld (born 1942), songwriter, music producer, creator of Woodstock Music and Arts Festival 1969
- Sandy Koufax (born 1935), baseball player, Los Angeles Dodgers
- Herbie Kronowitz (1923–2012), boxer
- Adam Lazzara (born 1982), lead singer of local band Taking Back Sunday
- James Hiroyuki Liao (born 1976), actor
- Paul Lo Duca (born 1972), baseball player
- James LoMenzo, musician, bass player for thrash metal band Megadeth
- Lordz Of Brooklyn hip hop/rock group member Dino Bootz – born and raised in Bensonhurst
- Paul Malignaggi (born 1980), professional boxer
- Tony Mamaluke (born 1977), former Extreme Championship Wrestling star
- Philomena Marano (born 1952), artist
- Paul Marks (1926–2020), scientist
- Robert Merrill (1917–2004), operatic baritone
- Alyssa Milano (born 1972), actress
- Jerrold Nadler (born 1947), Congressman based in Manhattan who grew up in Bensonhurst and represents part of the area
- Sam Nahem (1915–2004), Major League Baseball pitcher
- Man Parrish (born 1958), music producer and artist
- Rhea Perlman (born 1948), actress
- Leah Remini (born 1970), actress; co-starred in The King of Queens
- Carl Sagan (1934–1996), astronomer, teacher and author
- Robert Sapolsky (born 1957), neuroendocrinologist, professor and author
- Steve Schirripa (born 1957), actor in HBO's The Sopranos
- John Serry Sr. (1915–2003), concert accordionist, composer, arranger, educator
- Tony Sirico (1942–2022), actor in HBO's The Sopranos
- Ralph Snyderman (born 1940), physician, scientist and administrator
- Paul Sorvino (1939–2022), actor known for his role in Goodfellas and father of Mira Sorvino
- Ray Suarez (born 1957), news correspondent
- Anthony Terlato (1934–2020)), winemaker, Horatio Alger Award winner, "Father of Pinot Grigio" in the U.S
- Frank P. Tomasulo (born 1947), film professor, academic administrator, journal editor, author
- Alan Vega (1938–2016), vocalist and visual artist
- Hilma Wolitzer (born 1930), novelist.
- Peter Zimroth (born 1943), attorney who served as the court-appointed monitor of the New York Police Department's policies and practices regarding stop-and-frisk

=== Organized crime ===
A number of high-profile organized crime figures hail from Bensonhurst, including Frankie Yale, Anthony Casso, Paul Castellano, Mikey DiLeonardo, Anthony Gaggi, Dominick Montiglio, Carlo Gambino, John Gambino, Sammy "The Bull" Gravano, Gregory Scarpa, and Carmine Sessa.

== See also ==
- Murder of Yusef Hawkins
