= Sheila Moriber Katz =

American pathologist

- Born: Sheila Susan Moriber; February 1, 1943; Brooklyn, New York
- Died: September 10, 2023 (age 80); Gladywyne, Pennsylvania
- Occupations: Pathologist, writer, medical school dean

Sheila Sue Moriber Katz (February 1, 1943 – September 10, 2023) was an American pathologist and writer, dean of the Hahnemann University School of Medicine, and co-founder of the School of Public Health at Drexel. She is sometimes described as the first person to see the bacterium Legionella pneumophila, which causes Legionnaires' disease.

== Early life and education ==
Moriber was born in Brooklyn's Bensonhurst neighborhood, the daughter of Joseph Moriber and Muriel Goldfinger Moriber. Her father was a lawyer and real estate developer. She graduated from Cornell University in 1962 at the age of 19. She earned a medical degree at Duke University School of Medicine in 1966. In 1990 she earned an MBA at the Wharton School.

== Career ==
Katz was a pathologist and professor at Hahnemann University School of Medicine beginning in 1974. She reached full professor status in 1981, and in 1993 became senior associate dean. She was director of the microscopy laboratory at Hahnemann, and co-founder of the School of Public Health there. She was president of the Philadelphia County Medical Society, and of the Duke University Medical School Alumni Council.

Katz studied Legionnaire's disease after a deadly outbreak in Philadelphia in 1976. She may have caught the disease herself, from handling a sample of infected lung tissue. She was the first scientist to see the bacterium Legionella pneumophila. Newsweek magazine included Katz in a list of 100 "unsung heroes" in 1986. In 1993 she was honored by the Girl Scouts of Greater Philadelphia as a woman achiever in science.

In the 1990s, Katz led the White House Commission on Complementary and Alternative Medicine. She was executive officer of the Allegheny Health Education and Research Foundation in Philadelphia. She founded her own business, NewMedicine, in 2000. Katz also wrote poetry.

== Publications ==
Katz's research was published in academic journals including Science, The Lancet, JAMA: Journal of the American Medical Association, The New England Journal of Medicine, Human Pathology, Cancer, Annals of Clinical & Laboratory Science, American Journal of Clinical Pathology, Radiology, Ultrastructural Pathology, Gastroenterology, and Diagnostic Cytopathology.

- "The fibrous variant of Hashimoto's thyroiditis" (1974, with Austin L. Vickery Jr.)
- "Thymoma in a 12-year-old boy" (1976, with Jane Chatten)
- "Urinary Ultrastructural Findings in Fabry Disease" (1977, with Patricia J. Lyons)
- "Examination of Sputum in Legionnaire's Disease" (1978)
- "Legionnaires' disease: structural characteristics of the organism" (1978, with Philip Nash)
- "Leydig cell tumors of the testis" (1979, with I. Damjanov and M. A. Jewett)
- "Ultrastructural Features of Respiratory Cilia in Cystic Fibrosis" (1980, with Douglas S. Holsclaw Jr.)
- "Postinflammatory pseudotumors of the lung: fibrous histiocytoma and related lesions" (1980, with E. E. Schwartz and G. A. Mandell)
- "Tolmetin: Association With Reversible Renal Failure and Acute Interstitial Nephritis" (1981, with Ralph Capaldo, Erich A. Everts, and John G. DiGregorio)
- "Pleomorphism of Legionella pneumophila" (1984, with Shahab Hashemi, Kristy R. Brown, William A. Habib, and Jay M. Hammel)
- "Cilia in the Human Kidney" (1984, with Joseph J. Morgan)
- Legionellosis (1985)
- "Microscopic Nephrocalcinosis in Cystic Fibrosis" (1988, with Leslie J. Krueger and Bonita L. Falkner)
- "A Self-Limited Febrile Illness Produced in Guinea Pigs Associated With Oral Administration of Legionella pneumophila" (1988, with Jay M. Hammel, Joseph P. Matus, Ronald Poropatich, and Julian Katz)
- "Diagnostic value of electron microscopy on paraffin-embedded cytologic material" (1993, with Nancy A. Young and Sonya Naryshkin)

== Personal life ==
Moriber married fellow medical student Julian Katz in 1963. They had two children, Jonathan and Sara, both of whom became physicians. Her husband died in 2014, and she died in 2023, at her home in Gladwyne, Pennsylvania, at the age of 80, from complications related to Parkinson's disease.
