= Aaron De Groft =

American museum director (1965–2025)

- Born: December 2, 1965; Smithfield, Virginia, U.S.
- Died: January 18, 2025 (aged 59); Orlando, Florida, U.S.
- Education: College of William & Mary (BA); University of South Carolina-Columbia (MA); Florida State University (PhD)
- Occupations: Museum director; author; art curator
- Spouse: Kathryn Lee Gardner (m. 1991)
- Children: 2

Aaron Herbert De Groft (December 2, 1965 – January 18, 2025) was an American museum director, author, and art curator. He was a deputy director and chief curator at the John and Mable Ringling Museum of Art and a director for the Muscarelle Museum of Art at the College of William & Mary before he joined the Orlando Museum of Art in Florida in 2021. He was fired from the latter position in June 2022, after a collection of alleged Jean-Michel Basquiat paintings exhibited in the museum were found to be forgeries.

== Early life ==
Aaron Herbert De Groft was born in Smithfield, Virginia, on December 2, 1965, to Herbert and Mary Ellen De Groft. He attended Smithfield High School where he played baseball and football, and also wrestled. He was salutatorian for his class of 134 students, and graduated in June 1984.

== Education and career ==
De Groft attended university at the College of William & Mary in Williamsburg, Virginia, where he majored in history and graduated with a Bachelor of Arts degree in 1988. During that time, he took a position at the Muscarelle Museum of Art under then-director Glenn D. Lowry who had him performing manual jobs before moving into more of a research role. He went on to earn a master's degree in art history and museum studies with a speciality in contemporary American painting at the University of South Carolina-Columbia. He attended Florida State University, where he studied art history and earned his PhD in 2000 with a dissertation called "John Ringling In Perpetua Memoria: The Legacy and Prestige of Art and Collecting". While at FSU, he contributed to the Winterthur Portfolio academic journal, writing an article called "Eloquent Vessels/Poetics of Power", focusing on the pottery of David Drake.

De Groft edited one book, authored two books on his own, and co-authored three more, subjects of which include the Ca' d'Zan, Caravaggio, Fred Eversley, Michelangelo, and John and Mable Ringling. He wrote the preface for Building the Brafferton: The founding, funding, and legacy of America's Indian School. In October 2021, Orlando Magazine named him one of Orlando's 50 most powerful people in the entertainment, sports, and the arts, coming in at number four.

De Groft stayed in Florida for the early part of his career. He was the deputy director and chief curator at the John and Mable Ringling Museum of Art for 11 years, preceded by a position as chief curator at the Cummer Museum of Art and Gardens in Jacksonville, both located in the state. He worked to save the Ca' d'Zan mansion in Sarasota, Florida, and oversaw the $15 million conservation and restoration budget for the project, after which he was invited to apply to become director of the Muscarelle Museum of Art in Williamsburg, Virginia, a position which he accepted.

=== Muscarelle Museum of Art ===
At Muscarelle, De Groft oversaw "the first-ever international loan exhibition of Botticelli's works" in the United States. He also arranged for some of Michelangelo's pieces that "almost never travel" to be shown there in 2013 during the exhibit "Michelangelo: Sacred and Profane; Masterpiece Drawings from the Casa Buonarroti". De Groft is largely credited for saving the museum from closing when the budget was substantially slashed in 2002.

While at Muscarelle, De Groft directed the purchase of an unattributed painting that he credited to Paul Cézanne. De Groft partnered with art historian and Muscarelle Museum's then-chief curator John Spike to authenticate the painting, assisted by a William & Mary chemistry associate professor and a paintings conservator from the Colonial Williamsburg Foundation. The authentication of the Cézanne was preceded by attempts to authenticate a painting as a Titian in the early 2000s. The purported Titian was from 1539 to 1540 and titled Portrait of Federico II Gonzaga, Duke of Mantua. In 2002, prior to his arrival at the Muscarelle Museum of Art, De Groft partnered with J. Allen Tucker to write an article for the peer-reviewed journal Ultrastructural Pathology about the piece, where they posited it was authenticated in the early 1900s, challenged by German art historian August L. Mayer in 1938 who said the piece was not authentic, and then re-authenticated under De Groft's direction to "persuasively conclude that this portrait is authentic." The work traveled, eventually being displayed at the Musée du Luxembourg, a gallery in Paris, France, where William T. Walker of William & Mary incorrectly suggests that the loan was part of the Muscarelle collection and said, "The exhibition is the talk of the French capital."

After the Basquiat affair, art historian Charles Hope lambasted De Groft's testing and authentication of the Titian, saying, "The portrait is, to most people's eyes including my own, a feeble work unworthy of Titian himself. I tend to be suspicious of art historians using exotic scientific techniques to boost the credibility of second-rate pictures. It is an extremely common practice, and seldom, in my experience, produces convincing results." After working at Muscarelle for 14 years, De Groft left in December 2018.

=== Orlando Museum of Art and Basquiat paintings scandal ===
De Groft accepted the director's position at the Orlando Museum of Art in February 2021 after Glen Gentele exited the position. In January 2022, De Groft was going to give a lecture on a piece by expressionist painter Jackson Pollock. The speech was cancelled when the painting's authenticity was called into question.

He was in charge of a 2022 exhibition of Jean-Michel Basquiat paintings in a show called "Heroes & Monsters". The 25 Basquiat paintings were reportedly recovered from a storage unit in Los Angeles, California, in 2012. The paintings had never been seen before and, if real, had an estimated value of $100 million. In February 2022, The New York Times raised questions about the authenticity and provenance of the works, noting that one painting was made on FedEx shipping material featuring a typeface the company did not begin using until 1994, years after Basquiat's death. De Groft had allegedly threatened to fire museum workers who raised questions about the authenticity of the artwork. In June 2022, the museum was raided by the Federal Bureau of Investigation, and the paintings were seized. A Los Angeles-based auctioneer later admitted to helping forge the paintings.

The museum fired De Groft in 2022, and the following year, sued him, alleging fraud, conspiracy, breach of fiduciary duty, and breach of contract. After the FBI raid, the museum faced a $1 million deficit for fiscal year 2024 from spending hundreds of thousands of dollars on crisis communications and legal fees. De Groft insisted the paintings were genuine throughout the remainder of his life, and later filed a countersuit against the museum, alleging wrongful dismissal.

=== Retrospective analysis of authentication patterns ===
After De Groft was fired from the Orlando Museum of Art, his past authentications were called into question. Writing for Observer, journalist Alexandra Tremayne-Pengelly said, "[De Groft] has exhibited a pattern of acquiring unremarkable paintings at auction and then attributing them to masters." Art advisor Todd Levin said, "De Groft has a history of being involved with so-called discoveries. The question that remains is how accurate has his past performance of reattributing works been?"

== Personal life ==
De Groft married Kathryn Lee (née Gardner) at the Ashland Place United Methodist Church in Mobile, Alabama, on September 28, 1991. Kathryn is the daughter of Ann Medlin Gardner and pathologist Dr. William A. Gardner of Mobile, the latter of whom died in 2011. Like De Groft, she attended the University of South Carolina-Columbia. As of 2021, De Groft lived in Baldwin Park, Orlando, Florida, and enjoyed playing gin rummy with Kathryn. He also enjoyed hunting, fishing, and exercising at the gym. He died in Orlando from a brief illness on January 18, 2025, at the age of 59.

Painter Franz Kline was one of De Groft's favorite artists. Sculptures he appreciated included two works by Michelangelo, the first being Pietà, which he called "beyond amazing", and Rondanini Pietà, which he stated makes him cry.

== Bibliography ==
=== As author ===
- De Groft, Aaron H. Ringling and Rubens. (2003) ISBN 978-0916758486
- De Groft, Aaron H. Michelangelo: Anatomy as Architecture, Drawings By the Master. (2010) ISBN 978-0970572547

=== As co-author ===
- De Groft, Aaron H.; Weeks, David C. A Pictorial History of John and Mable Ringling. (2003) ISBN 978-0916758493
- De Groft, Aaron H.; Weeks, David C. Ca d'Zan – Inside the Ringling Mansion. (2004) ISBN 978-0916758479
- De Groft, Aaron H; Eversely, Fred. Fred Eversley: 50 years an artist: Light & space & energy. (2017) ISBN 978-0996804141

=== As editor ===
- De Groft, Aaron H. Caravaggio Still Life with Fruit on a Stone Ledge. (2010) ISBN 978-0970572561

=== Preface only ===
- Woodard, Buck; Moretti-Langholtz, Danielle. Building the Brafferton: The founding, funding, and legacy of America's Indian School. (2019) ISBN 978-0996804158
