= Parkville station =

Parkville station may refer to:

- Parkville railway station, Australia
- Parkville station (Connecticut), U.S.
- United States Post Office (Bensonhurst, Brooklyn), also known as Parkville Station
