= Jack Catran =

American designer and scientist

- Born: January 22, 1918; Brooklyn, New York
- Died: January 18, 2001 (aged 82); Riverside, California
- Education: University of Southern California; University of California, Los Angeles; University of London
- Occupations: Engineer, Psychologist, Linguist
- Notable work: Is There Intelligent Life On Earth? (1980), How to Speak English Without a Foreign Accent (1986)

Jack Catran (January 22, 1918 – January 18, 2001) was an American industrial designer, behavioral psychologist, scientist, and linguist. He was a NASA human factors engineer on the first Apollo mission and was best known for his refutation of Carl Sagan's attempts to locate extraterrestrial life in outer-space.

== Biography ==
Catran was born on January 22, 1918, to a Sephardic Jewish family in Brooklyn, New York. He grew up in the neighborhood of Bensonhurst where he began participating in vaudevillian theater during the 1930s and 1940s, and became interested in science as well. He had dropped out of high school but moved to Los Angeles in 1941 where he attended Chouinard Art Institute under the GI Bill. He returned to school at USC and UCLA where he earned his master's degree in psychology. He began teaching technical illustration and perspective drawing at the Van Nuys High School, Van Nuys Adult School, and San Fernando High School where he employed experimental psychology techniques in his methods. He began his career as a technical and industrial designer for the aerospace industry in Los Angeles. He later attended the University of London to obtain his doctorate in psychology. He began working for the NASA Apollo space program as a human factors engineer. Meanwhile, he was editor of the journal, Feedback. He also became president of the Beth Daiah Temple. He became an instructor at California State University, Northridge's Experimental College, where he taught such controversial classes as "Charm and Sex Appeal."

In the early 1980s, he wrote a series of articles in The New York Times, the Chicago Tribune, the Los Angeles Times, Newsweek, and the Humanist in response to the attempts of some cosmologists, primarily Carl Sagan, to theorize and locate the existence of intelligent life in outer-space. In 1980, he wrote the underground classic Is There Intelligent Life On Earth which thoroughly attempted to refute the whole idea of SETI. In the book he also argued that the global monetary system is the central cause of societal ills and that eventually the money system would give way to a moneyless technologically governed society that would eliminate waste, poverty, and crime. He was also one of the few scientists to argue that humans are probably alone in the universe. Catran appeared on radio and television arguing his point. A national television show attempted to arrange a debate between Catran and Sagan, but Sagan turned it down.

He later became interested in linguistics and became a consultant for 20th Century Fox. He trained such actors as John Belushi and Richard Burton to speak with various accents. He would eventually write a series of books and audio tapes entitled How To Speak English Without A Foreign Accent which provided exercises for speakers to lose accents across fifteen different languages. He became a prominent radio show host in the 1980s and 1990s in Los Angeles area, hosting a show on KGIL where he assisted callers in eliminating their accents.

Catran published Walden Three in 1988. Following on the philosophical and ideological orientation of B. F. Skinner's Walden Two, it was a 422-page science fiction scenario with occasional sections of biographical memoir, both of which centered on the life and philosophy of Jacque Fresco via pseudonymous protagonist "Jack Tedesco."

Catran later hosted the midnight show, Brooklyn Bridge, featuring entertainers from the 1930s and 1940s. He published his last book, a novel, in 1994. He died January 18, 2001, in Riverside, California..

=== Bibliography ===
- Is there intelligent life on earth? (1980)
- How to Speak English Without a Foreign Accent (1986–1991)
- Walden Three (1988)
- The Plot to Win the White House and How It Succeeded (1994)
