= Brooklyn School of Inquiry =

Coordinates: 40.6070°N 73.9867°W

Brooklyn School of Inquiry (20K686)
- 50 Avenue P Brooklyn, NY, USA

Information
- Type: School for Talented and Gifted Children (Public School)
- Established: 2009
- Principal: Eric Havlik
- Enrollment: 594 students
- School Number: PS/IS 686
- Website: www.bsi686.org

Brooklyn School of Inquiry (PS/IS 686), often referred to as BSI, is a progressive, constructivist New York City public school, located at 50 Avenue P in the Bensonhurst neighborhood of Brooklyn. It grew by one grade annually until 2016, when it reached capacity as an elementary/middle school serving students from kindergarten through grade eight. BSI is the only citywide Gifted and Talented (G&T) program in Brooklyn and one of five in all of New York City. G&T programs are provided for students identified as gifted and talented by assessments that are administered by the New York City Department of Education(DOE). For the program, students are selected solely based on test scores. To be eligible for placement to Citywide G&T programs, students have to score at or above the 97th percentile on the assessments administered.

The school hired a new principal, Eric Havlik, in the fall of 2017. Mr. Havlik had previously been assistant principal at P.S. 154 in Windsor Terrace, Brooklyn.

The school's initial principal was Donna Taylor, a graduate of Hunter College. She worked for approximately six years as a NYC Public School teacher before attending the NYC Leadership Academy. On June 19, 2017, Donna Taylor announced that she was stepping down from her position as principal of BSI.

== Physical Plant ==
Brooklyn School of Inquiry is located on the fourth floor of the PS/IS 237 campus. The campus, designed by STV Group, Inc., also houses The Academy of Talented Scholars (PS 682) and The Jim Thorpe School a District 75 special education school. It has 4 floors and an indoor gym as well as an outdoor play area.
