= Adventurer's Park =

Amusement park in Brooklyn, New York

- Previously known as Nellie Bly Park
- Interactive map of Adventurer's Park
- Location: Nellie Bly Park, Brooklyn, New York, USA
- Coordinates: 40.5907°N 73.9946°W
- Status: Operating
- Opened: 1966; 60 years ago
- Website: adventurerspark.com

Adventurer's Park is a small amusement park in the Gravesend section of Brooklyn in New York City. The concession, located within the city-owned Nellie Bly Park, next to the Belt Parkway, was opened in 1966. The concession, also originally named Nellie Bly Park, features classic kiddie rides and arcade games as well as a Ferris wheel, go carts and miniature golf.
