= United States Post Office (Bensonhurst, Brooklyn) =

Historic post office in Brooklyn, New York

- US Post Office-Parkville Station
- U.S. National Register of Historic Places
- New York State Register of Historic Places
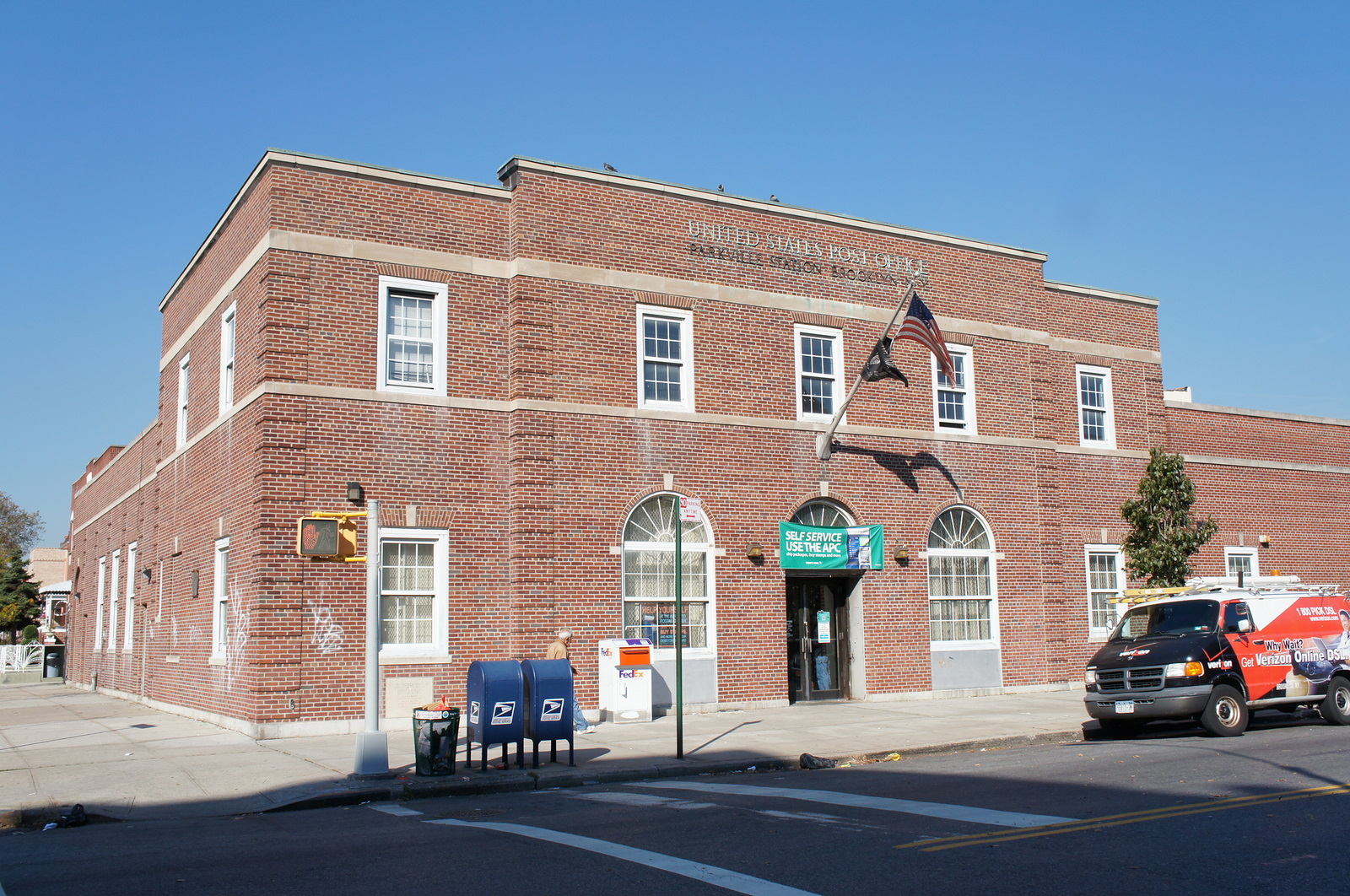
- November 2011

- Location within New York City Location within New York Location within the United States
- Location: 6618 20th Ave., Bensonhurst, Brooklyn
- Coordinates: 40°36′56″N 73°59′15″W
- Area: less than one acre
- Built: 1936
- Architects: U.S. Treasury Dept.; Pratt, Carroll H.
- Architectural style: Colonial Revival
- MPS: US Post Offices in New York State, 1858-1943, TR
- NRHP reference No.: 88002463
- NYSRHP No.: 04701.002507

Significant dates
- Added to NRHP: November 17, 1988
- Designated NYSRHP: November 17, 1988

US Post Office-Parkville Station, originally known as Station "Y," is a historic post office building located at Bensonhurst in Brooklyn, New York, United States. It was built in 1936, and designed by consulting architect Carroll H. Pratt for the Office of the Supervising Architect. The building is a two-story, flat roofed red brick building with a one-story rear wing in the Colonial Revival style.

It was listed on the National Register of Historic Places in 1988.
