= Ultrastructural Pathology =

- Discipline: Diagnostic ultrastructural pathology
- Language: English
- Edited by: Jahn M. Nesland

Publication details
- History: 1980–present
- Publisher: Informa Healthcare
- Frequency: Bimonthly
- Impact factor: 0.694 (2016)

Standard abbreviations
- ISO 4: Ultrastruct. Pathol.

Indexing
- CODEN: ULPAD3
- ISSN: 0191-3123 (print); 1521-0758 (web)
- OCLC no.: 04848588

Links
- Journal homepage; Online access; Online archive

Ultrastructural Pathology is a bimonthly peer-reviewed medical journal devoted entirely to diagnostic ultrastructural pathology. The journal covers advances in the uses of electron microscopic and immunohistochemical techniques, correlations of ultrastructural data with light microscopy, histochemistry, immunohistochemistry, biochemistry, cell and tissue culturing, electron probe analysis, and investigative, clinical, and diagnostic EM methods. The editor-in-chief is Jahn M. Nesland (Institute for Cancer Research, Norwegian Radium Hospital, Oslo, Norway).

According to the Journal Citation Reports, the journal has a 2016 impact factor of 0.694.
