= BMT Fourth Avenue Line =

New York City Subway line

- D and N trains serve the majority of the BMT Fourth Avenue Line, while the R train serves its entirety. The W train provides occasional service during rush hours.

Overview
- Status: Operational
- Owner: City of New York
- Locale: Brooklyn, New York City
- Termini: Court Street; Bay Ridge–95th Street
- Stations: 16

Service
- Type: Rapid transit
- System: New York City Subway
- Operator: New York City Transit Authority
- Daily ridership: 162,253 (2023)

History
- Opened: June 22, 1915; 111 years ago
- Last extension: 1925

Technical
- Number of tracks: 2–6
- Character: Underground
- Track gauge: 4 ft 8 1/2 in (1,435 mm)
- Electrification: 600V DC third rail
Route map
Express station	Local station	Closed station

The BMT Fourth Avenue Line is a rapid transit line of the New York City Subway, mainly running under Fourth Avenue in Brooklyn. The line is served by the D, N, and R at all times; the R typically runs local, while the D and N run express during the day and local at night. During rush hours, select W trains also serve the line. Northbound D and N trains run local along the line after 6:45 p.m. during weekdays as well. The line was originally built by the Brooklyn Rapid Transit Company (BRT; later Brooklyn–Manhattan Transit Corporation, or BMT) and is now internally operated as part of the New York City Subway's B Division.

The fully underground line starts as a two-track line in Downtown Brooklyn west of Court Street, connecting to the BMT Broadway Line and BMT Nassau Street Line in Manhattan via the Montague Street Tunnel under the East River. It travels east under Montague and Willoughby Streets to DeKalb Avenue, where it then turns southeast under Flatbush Avenue. At DeKalb Avenue, the express tracks, which continue from the Manhattan Bridge to the northwest, split off from the BMT Brighton Line and join the Fourth Avenue Line. At Atlantic Avenue–Barclays Center, the line curves southwest under Fourth Avenue to the end of the line at Bay Ridge–95th Street. Going south from Atlantic Avenue, the BMT West End Line splits from both the local and express tracks south of 36th Street, while the express tracks continue as the BMT Sea Beach Line south of 59th Street.

Fourth Avenue never had a streetcar line or elevated railway due to the provisions of the assessment charged to neighboring property owners when the street was widened. Construction of the line was only undertaken because of the efforts of the local communities. After the line was opened, development resulting from the line's construction transformed communities such as Dyker Heights, Fort Hamilton, Bay Ridge, and Sunset Park. One station, Myrtle Avenue, was abandoned in 1956 as part of the reconfiguration of the busy DeKalb Avenue Junction.

== Route ==
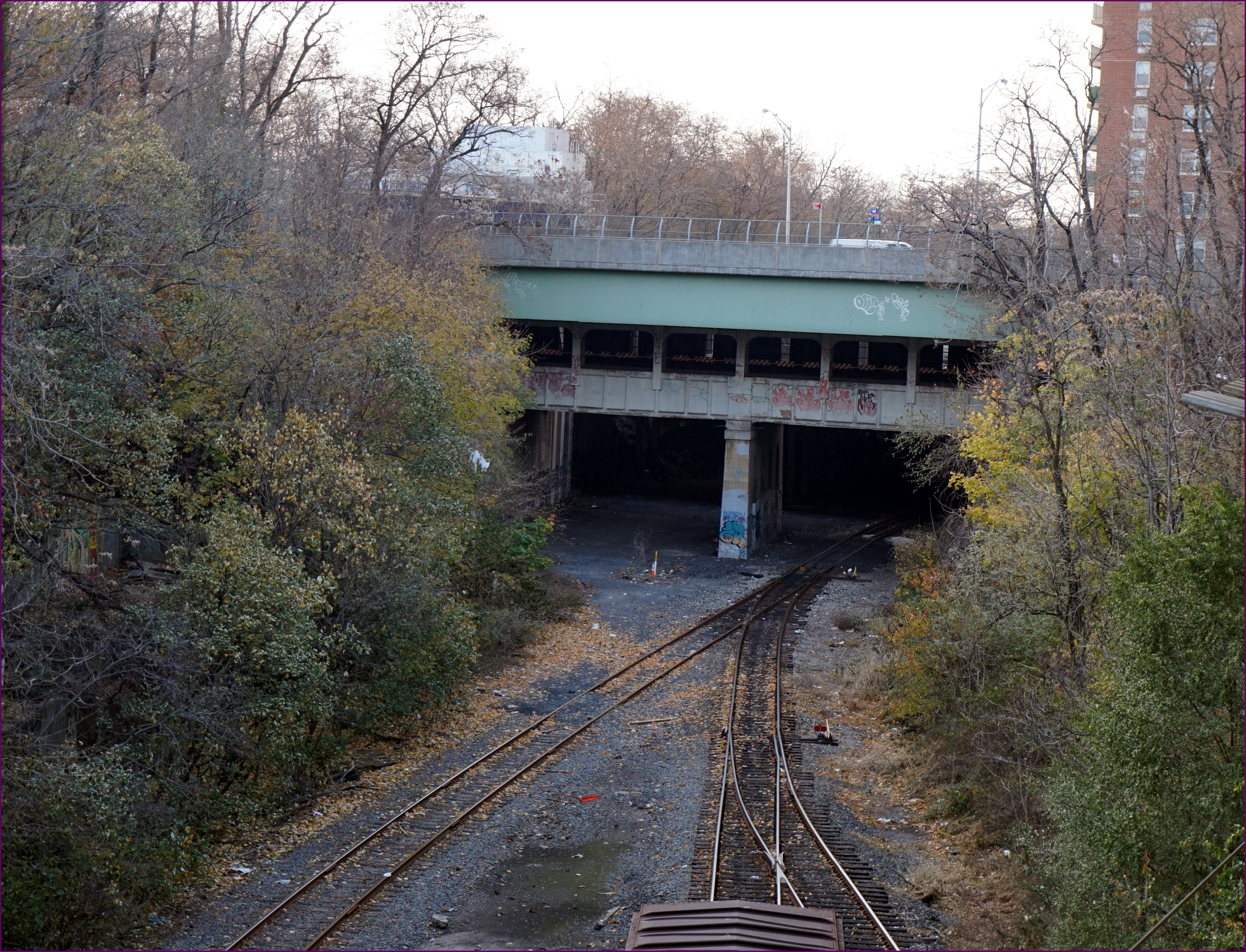
This is the Fourth Avenue Line Bridge over the Long Island Rail Road's Bay Ridge Branch. This bridge has space for two additional trackways.

Coming south from DeKalb Avenue and off of Fulton Street, the four-track line runs entirely under Fourth Avenue to just past 59th Street. South of 36th Street, the West End Line, formerly the New Utrecht Avenue elevated line, branches off eastward, running to its terminus at Coney Island–Stillwell Avenue. Until 1954, the BMT Culver Line also branched off from here, replaced by the Culver Shuttle until 1975, when it was discontinued. At 64th Street, after the Sea Beach Line branches off eastward towards Coney Island via an open-cut right-of-way, the line becomes two-tracked and continues under Fourth Avenue to its terminus at Bay Ridge–95th Street. Between 86th Street and 95th Street there is a third track available for train storage. While this section of the line was built with two tracks, there are provisions to add two additional express tracks between 59th and 85th Streets if the need ever arises.

The line's northernmost section serves Brooklyn Heights and Downtown Brooklyn. The central section serves Park Slope east of Fourth Avenue and north of Prospect Expressway; Boerum Hill and Gowanus west of Fourth Avenue and north of Prospect Expressway; and Sunset Park to the south of Prospect Expressway. The southernmost section serves the communities of Bay Ridge and Fort Hamilton.

== Services ==
The following services use the Fourth Avenue Line:

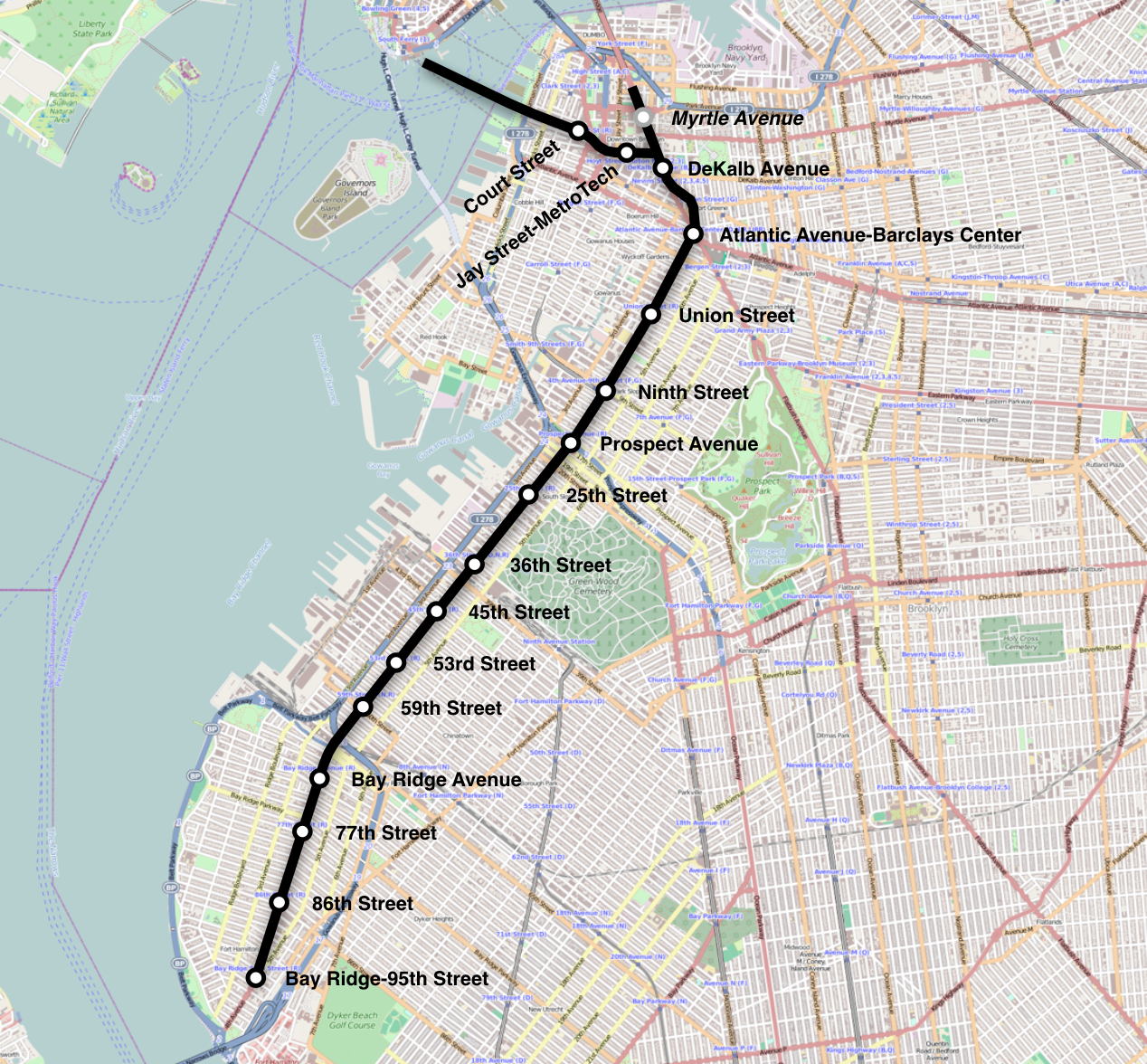
Fourth Avenue Line map

Route		Stops				
	Time period	West of DeKalb Ave	DeKalb Ave	Between Atlantic Ave and 36 St	Between 36 St and 59 St	Between 59 St and 95 St
"D" train	All except nights	no service		express	no service	
"D" train	Nights	no service	local		no service	
"N" train	All except nights and off-peak rush	no service		express		no service
"N" train	Off-peak rush (limited service)	no service	local			no service
"N" train	Nights	local				no service
"R" train	All times	local				
"W" train	Limited rush hours	local				no service

The line normally carries the Fourth Avenue R service on the local tracks and the Sea Beach N and West End D services on the express tracks. During weekdays, five local N trains per day are designated as W trains, Manhattan-bound from DeKalb Avenue, the local tracks run via the Montague Street Tunnel to Lower Manhattan, serving either Whitehall Street on the BMT Broadway Line (N, R) or Broad Street on the BMT Nassau Street Line (no service; the last service to use these tracks was the M, rerouted in 2010). The express tracks go to Manhattan via the Manhattan Bridge to either the BMT Broadway Line's Canal Street express station (N) or the IND Sixth Avenue Line's Grand Street station (D).

== History ==
=== Background ===
==== Context ====
Transportation to the area was first provided in 1889 with the establishment of the 39th Street Ferry, which connected the area to Manhattan. Between 1888 and 1893, a new elevated line was opened along Fifth Avenue. Initially, the line terminated at 27th Street where people could transfer to horse cars. In 1892, the first trolley line was built in Brooklyn, starting at the ferry and running via Second Avenue to 65th Street, and then via Third Avenue. The Fifth Avenue Elevated was then extended to Third Avenue and 65th Street.

A building boom in South Brooklyn started in about 1902 and 1903. Thousands of people started coming to the area from Manhattan and from other places. In 1905 and 1906 realty values increased by about 100 percent, and land values increased. This growth was spurred by the promise of improved transportation access. The improved transportation access transformed the community from an isolated farm community to a center of industrial and commercial life.

==== Planning ====
The Fourth Avenue Line was built as part of the Dual Contracts. It replaced the parallel elements of an old, now long-ago-demolished elevated system running above Fifth Avenue and Third Avenue. In 1902, a committee of the West End Board of Trade announced their support for a subway line from the Battery to Coney Island via Atlantic or Hamilton Avenues in front of the Rapid Transit Commission. The first definite plans for a subway under Fourth Avenue were proposed by Rapid Transit Commission engineer William Barclay Parsons in 1903. On April 10, 1905, a citizens' committee was created to aid the creation of the subway line.

In 1906, the plan for the Fourth Avenue subway included a spur via 86th Street running through Dyker Heights and Bensonhurst. At this time the spur was not authorized, but at the time it was viewed as a necessary part of the transportation plan for the area. The line was planned as a four-track line from Dean Street to Fort Hamilton, before being fed by a subway line going under the East River, and by a line over the Manhattan Bridge. An additional two-track spur was to begin at 37th Street before running under private property and 38th Street, before connecting with the South Brooklyn Railway. An additional two-track spur would branch off between 63rd and 64th Streets before connecting with the Sea Beach Railway. South of 65th Street the main line was planned to continue as a four-track line to 100th Street. Another proposal for a branch line was for a subway via New Utrecht Avenue. The line, consisting of four tracks, would have branched off at 40th Street before turning under New Utrecht Avenue and 86th Street to a point between 23rd and 24th Avenues. From there the line would have become an elevated line running to Coney Island. A spur of the Fourth Avenue line via 86th Street would have merged in here.

As a possible alternative to subway construction, engineer F. H. Behr proposed a monorail system for Brooklyn. Each car was proposed to carry 80 to 120 passengers and attain a speed of 100 miles per hour (160 km/h). An application was filed with the Board of Alderman for franchises for four routes, with the first running to South Brooklyn. It would have run from the intersection of Flatbush Avenue and Atlantic Avenue and down Fourth Avenue to 85th or 86th Streets, where it would turn eastward to Stillwell Avenue, where it would turn onto West 12th Street and continue to a terminal loop at Coney Island.

On June 1, 1905, the Rapid Transit Commission adopted the Fourth Avenue route to Fort Hamilton. The proposal, on July 7, 1905, was presented to the Board of Estimate, and was approved by them on July 14. The Mayor signed the bill on July 28. On June 18, 1906, the route was approved by the Appellate Division of the Supreme Court after the Rapid Transit Commission was unable to get the necessary consents of property owners along the planned route. This plan included a connection between the line and the Interborough Rapid Transit Company (IRT)'s extension into Brooklyn which was then planned to run under Flatbush Avenue. A track connection was also planned to another proposed route: this route would have run under Pacific Street, Court Street, and Montague Street, before running under the East River to Manhattan. That route was never built, but provisions were built for it in the south wall of the Montague Street Tunnel south of the Whitehall Street station.

On December 7, 1906, the Board of Estimate recommended that two bids be let: one for the construction of the line, and one for the construction, equipment, and operation of the line. A spur to Coney Island was added to the plan after the persistency of Frank Hudson. On May 31, 1907, the Rapid Transit Commission requested that the Board of Estimate rescind the above resolution so that bids of construction alone might be asked for, and it authorized the preparation of the plans and contracts. On June 4, 1907, a resolution was passed by the Board of Estimate that authorized the Rapid Transit Commission that rescinded the resolution and authorized the Rapid Transit Commission to let out bids of construction only. On June 27, 1907, the Rapid Transit Commission approved the plans and contracts with the exception of the section between Ashland Place and Fulton Street to Sackett Street and Fourth Avenue. The Rapid Transit Commission was succeeded by the Public Service Commission (PSC) on July 1, 1907, and the new commission hesitated to approve the plan for the line. People in South Brooklyn were angered by the delay, and 3,000 people from the area showed up to a meeting on September 11, 1907, urging the PSC to act. In October and November 1907, the PSC approved the plans and contracts with modifications concerning grades and an increase in the height of the subway to fifteen feet.

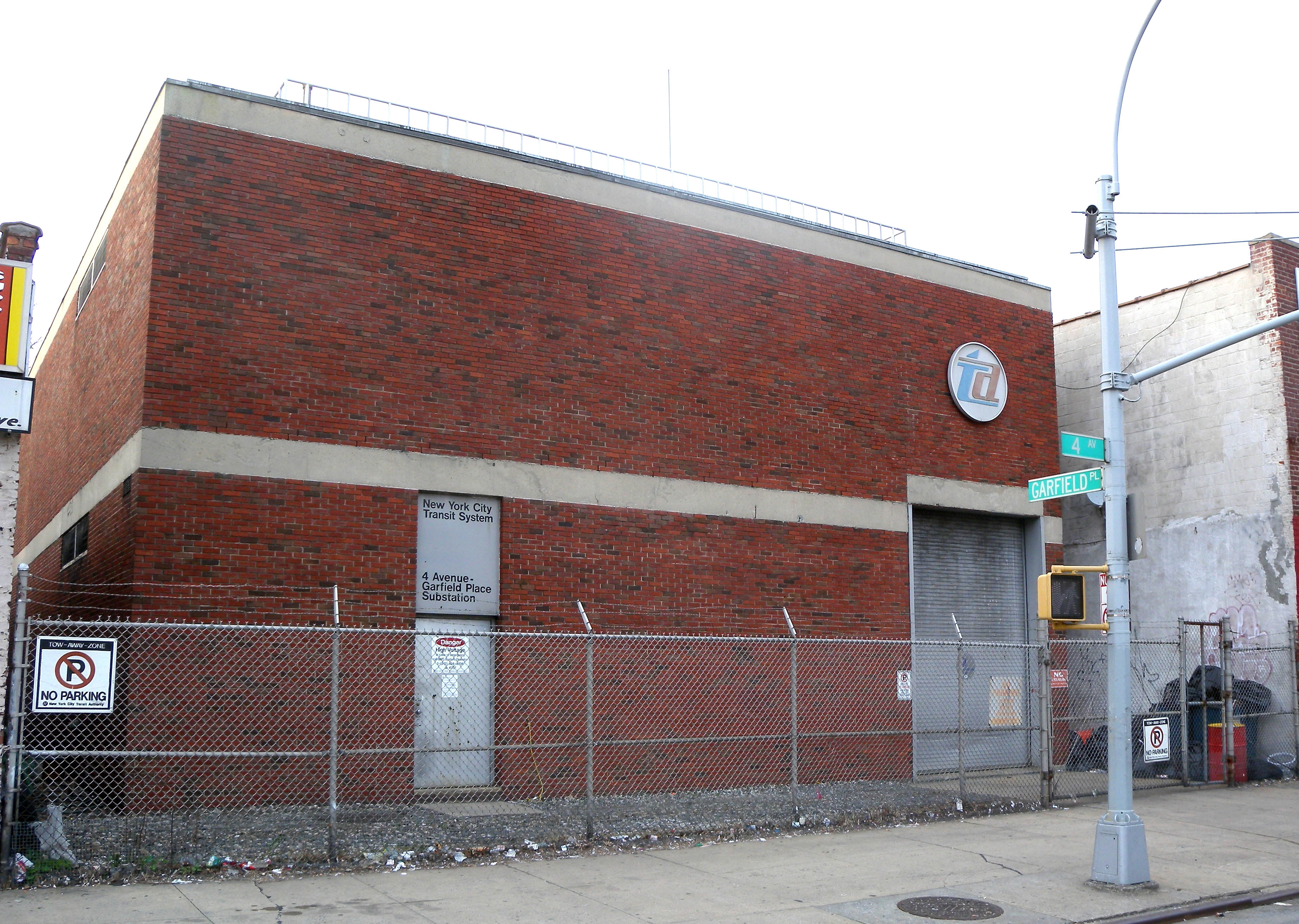
A view of the Garfield Place substation, which is used to power the Fourth Avenue Line

The commissioners, from the PSC, adopted plans for the line on March 10, 1908, and proposed contracts for the line. On March 20, 1908, at a meeting of the Board of Estimate, Controller Metz sent the plan to a committee within the Board for study, angering five hundred supporters of the line at the meeting. Coler, the Brooklyn Borough President, objected to the committee, citing that Mr. Lewis, the Chief Engineer, was against the construction of the project. This resolution was defeated, and the main resolution failed to get a two-thirds majority. Afterwards, Metz procured an injunction that restrained the Board from acting until the debt limit was established: this blocked any immediate action. After hearings, General Tracy announced that the project was $150,000,000 within the debt limit, and Mayor George McClellan and Controller Metz joined with their colleagues to vote unanimously in favor of the Fourth Avenue subway line on March 27, 1908.

In 1908, detailed plans were created by the PSC. The plan was changed to not have the line run via IRT trackage. In having it run via its own trackage, the line could be operated by railroads other than the IRT as standard 10 foot-wide railroad cars could fit through the tunnels. To connect to Manhattan without using IRT trackage the line would use part of contracts given for other lines. The line would use the Manhattan Bridge–Revised route, which was approved in 1909 and was originally conceived to connect the IRT Brooklyn Line at Flatbush Avenue, east of the Nevins Street station, to the Canal Street Subway and the proposed Third Avenue Subway going both north and south under the Bowery. The tracks would have used both the north and south tracks on the Manhattan Bridge.

==== Construction ====
Contracts were awarded on May 22, 1908, for the section between 43rd Street and the Manhattan Bridge, but the Board of Estimate did not approve them until a taxpayer's lawsuit regarding the city's debt was settled. They were approved on October 29, 1909. During the time between the award and approval of the contracts, a non-partisan political body, with the backing of 25,000 South Brooklyn residents, was created that would only support candidates in the municipal election that pledged support for the Fourth Avenue subway.

Groundbreaking for the first section of the subway, between DeKalb Avenue and 43rd Street (ending at 36th Street), took place on November 13, 1909, at DeKalb Avenue and Flatbush Avenue, after the plans and surveys for the line were completed. This section was completed in 1916. In June 1911, more than 70 percent of the excavation was completed. The line did not have to be excavated through tough bedrock like in Manhattan; in fact, there was not much difficulty, since Brooklyn soil is sandy. The construction of the first portion of the line was broken up into six sections. The construction of the line was expected to transform communities in South Brooklyn, such as Bay Ridge, Dyker Heights, Fort Hamilton, Bath Beach, and Coney Island.

Construction on the section between 27th Street and 43rd Street, Route 11A4, began on December 10, 1909, and it was completed in October 1912. Construction began on Route 11A3, the section between 10th Street and 27th Street, on December 20, 1909. It was completed in May 1912. The section between 10th Street and Sackett Street, Route 11A2, had construction started on it on December 20, 1909, and was completed in September 1912. Four days after the construction of that segment began, construction began on the segment under Ashland Place and under Fourth Avenue between Fulton Street and Sackett Street. Known as Route 11A1 and 11E1, it was completed in 1915. On March 18, 1910, construction began on the four tracks over the Manhattan Bridge. It was completed in September 1912.

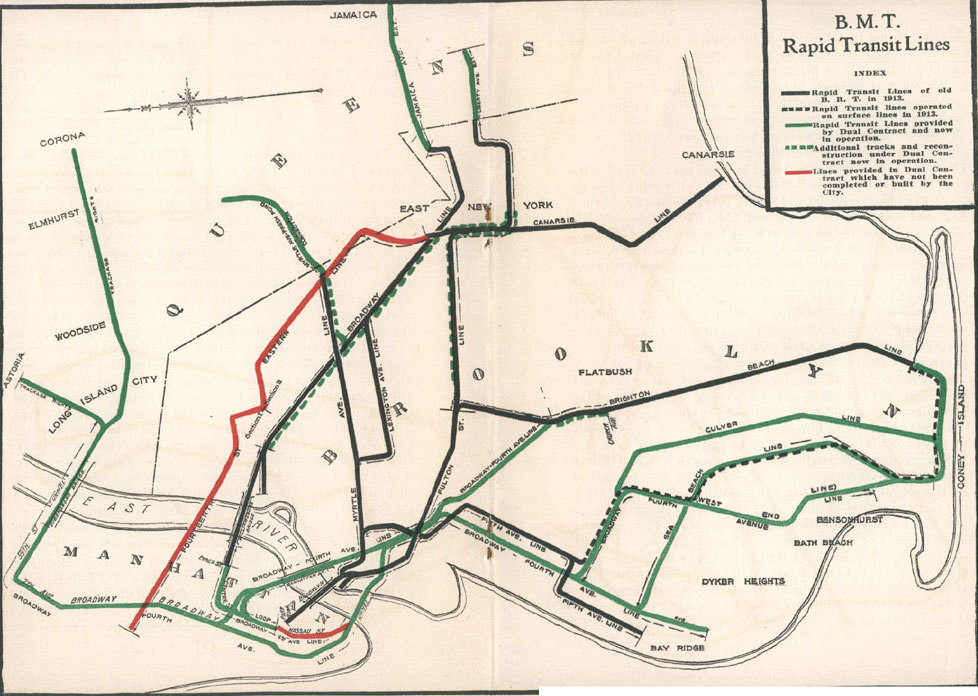
The extent of the BMT's Dual Contract lines in 1924

Not long after the contracts were awarded, the PSC started negotiating with the BRT and the IRT in the execution of the Dual Contracts. A lease to the Fourth Avenue subway was given to the New York Municipal Railway Corporation, a subsidiary of the BRT, for forty-nine years as part of Contract 4. The Dual Contracts were signed on March 19, 1913. In 1912, during the Dual System negotiations, the construction of an extension of the Fourth Avenue subway was recommended as part of the Dual System, and this recommendation was approved by the Board of Estimate on February 15, 1912. The PSC directed its Chief Engineer to create plans on June 14, 1912, and the contracts for the extension, Route 11B, was awarded on September 16, 1912. Later on, the plan for the extension was modified to include a connection with the Sea Beach Railroad between 64th and 65th Streets.

Construction on the southernmost section of the line to 89th Street, just south of the 86th Street station, began in late October 1912. The lower section of the line was constructed along with several branch lines, which replaced former surface railroads. These lines are the BMT West End Line splitting south of 36th Street, and the BMT Sea Beach Line leaving south of 59th Street. In anticipation of the opening of the subway, several housing and development booms occurred along Fourth Avenue, particularly in Bay Ridge. On January 24, 1913, construction begun on Route 11B2, the section between 61st Street and 89th Street. This section was built as a two-track structure under the west side of Fourth Avenue with plans for two future tracks on the east side of the street. The bridge across the Long Island Rail Road's Bay Ridge Branch, but under Fourth Avenue, was built for four tracks, but only the space for the two west tracks were ever used. The 86th Street station was designed for eventual conversion into a four-track, two island platform express station. If the two additional tracks were built, the east platform on all local stops south of 59th Street would be removed. Construction was completed on this section in 1915. On March 15, 1913, construction began on Route 11B1, the section between 43rd Street and 61st Street. Originally, this section was planned to have two tracks, but after the connection to the Sea Beach Line was added to the plan during the middle of construction, the plan was changed to four tracks. This section was completed in 1915.

==== Differences with the original subway ====
The dimensions of the Fourth Avenue Line are different from those of the original subway opened by the IRT in 1904. The height of the roof above the base rail in IRT lines was 12.83 feet (3.91 m), while the height is 15 feet (4.6 m) on the Fourth Avenue Line, allowing for the possible operation of larger subway cars. Precautions were taken to keep out water, as evidenced by the placement of waterproofing under the floor, along the sides, and over the roof of the tunnel. This was expected to make the subway cooler in hot weather than the original subway. Partitions were created in between the tracks to allow for improved ventilation, and to allow for the safety of employees, niches were provided in the partitions. All of the platforms, both express and local, were built to be straight to avoid the inconvenience of curved platforms. The local stations were originally 435 feet (133 m), while the express stations were originally 480 feet (150 m) long, allowing for eight-car expresses and six-car locals. The stations were all finished in white and marble tile; each station had its own color scheme to allow for regular passengers to identify their station based only on the color of the marble trimmings.

=== Early years ===
==== Opening ====
The first train to run via the entirety of the line was a test train that operated on June 15, 1915. The trip used the local tracks as the express tracks were not yet completed due to the reconstruction of the DeKalb Avenue station. A trial trip that ran earlier in the day ripped a piece off of the platform at DeKalb Avenue as it was too broad. At this time, the line was scheduled to be inaugurated with a ceremonial trip on June 19, before being opened to the public on June 21. However, the opening was delayed a day to June 22, 1915, when the line opened from the Manhattan Bridge through to the Sea Beach Line. The ceremonial trip took place three days prior. Initially, service only ran via the Nassau Loop tracks to Chambers Street as the new subway under Broadway was not yet open. Construction on the initial portion of the line cost about $30 million. The opening of the line reduced congestion on the elevated lines operating over the Brooklyn Bridge, and on the Original Subway, though to a lesser extent.

Prior to the line's opening, the line was expected to not be open until around July 4 due to problems with the signaling system. One major change to the line's construction was completed: the conversion of DeKalb Avenue to an express station. Originally, DeKalb Avenue was going to be a local station. However, during the middle of construction, it was changed to an express station and track crossovers had to be installed. The reasoning for this is due to changes required by the Dual Contracts. An additional line, the Whitehall–Montague Street route, was to be built connecting the Broadway Line in Manhattan and the Fourth Avenue subway under the Flatbush Avenue Extension to the west of the DeKalb Avenue station. By making the station express, express trains that would be operated through the Montague Street line could stop at the station. Crossovers connecting the express and local tracks would allow for this. Construction continued even after the line opened, necessitating that service only use the line's local tracks for a few weeks. One other change was required during the middle of construction. As part of the original plan the connection to the West End Line was to be at 40th Street. However, the connection had to be moved to 38th Street to obey the requirements of Contract 4, and the already completed connection had to be changed. To do so, the 36th Street station had to be partially reconstructed. Work was almost completely finished in June 1915.

The 45th and 53rd Street stations initially remained closed, despite being technically complete, since the stations were being used by a contractor to haul dirt out. The stations opened on September 22, 1915.

==== Expansion ====
The line opened from 59th Street to 86th Street on January 15, 1916. Trains from 86th Street ran to Chambers Street in Manhattan via the Fourth Avenue Line local tracks. On this date, the express tracks opened for service, with Sea Beach Line trains running express between 59th Street and Chambers Street at all times except late nights, when they ran local.

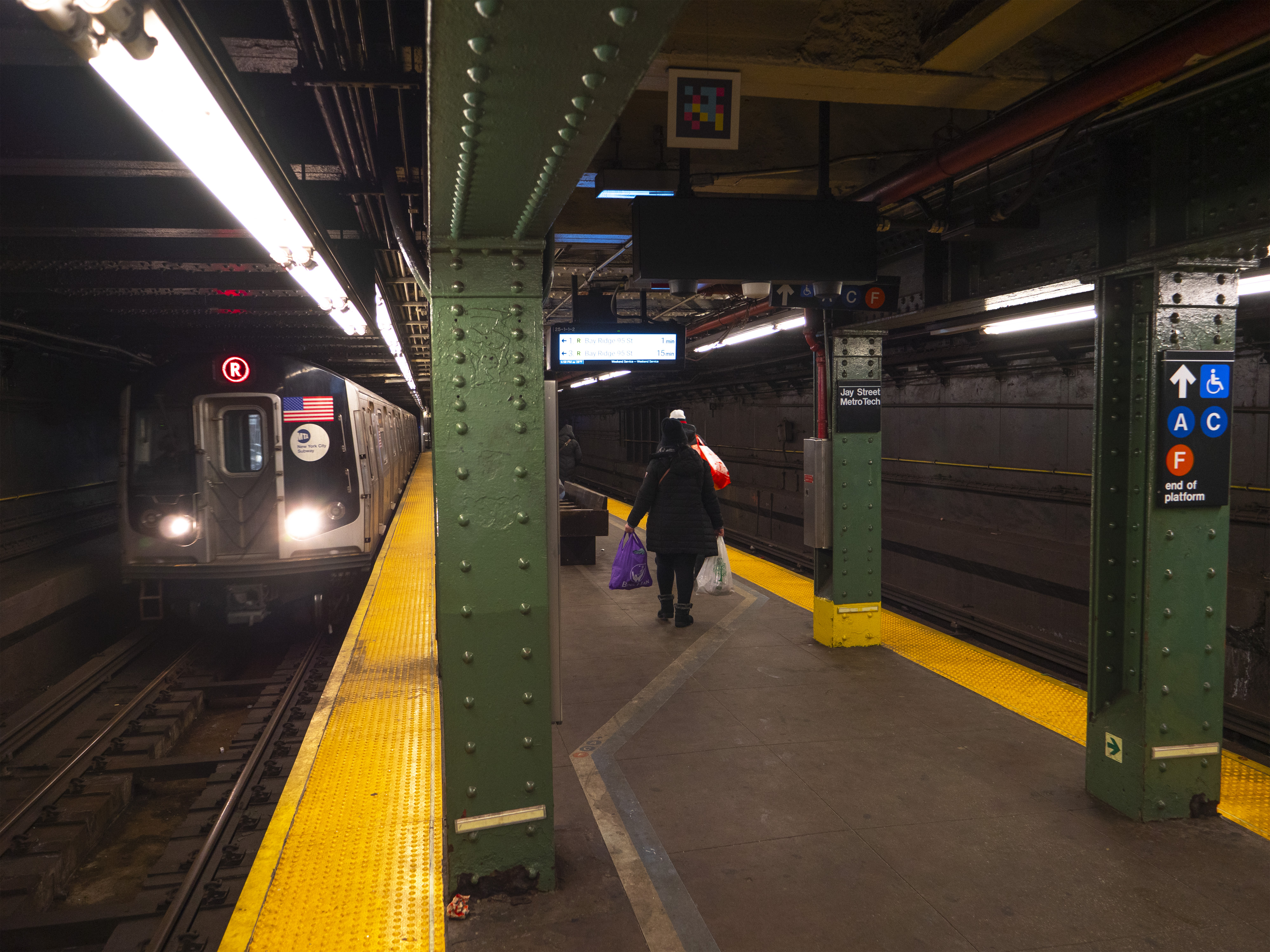
The Lawrence Street station (now Jay Street–MetroTech) was built after that section of the line had already been completed.

Even though the contract was approved for the Montague Street Tunnel, and the subway line connecting to it, in 1916, it was decided to add an infill station at Lawrence Street and Willoughby Street. In 1917, the original contract was modified and a provision for the station was added. Work started in October 1917, but construction halted on May 18, 1918, because of a wartime shortage of materials and men due to World War I, and about half the station was completed. Service running through the Montague Tunnel and this station began on August 1, 1920, while the station was being construction alongside in-service trains. The line was called the Montague Street Tunnel Line.

Construction resumed on May 18, 1922, and entailed the construction of an island platform between the two cast iron-lined tunnels, a mezzanine, and a station entrance, which required excavation from the street. On June 11, 1924, the Lawrence Street station opened with the Lawrence Street entrances; the Bridge Street entrances opened later. A special train to Prospect Park operated for the station's opening. A unique feature at the west end of the station was a folding platform edge that was necessary to clear a crossover switch that was partially underneath the platform.

On August 25, 1922, the Transit Commission directed its chief engineer, Robert Ridgway, to plan an extension of the Fourth Avenue Line from 87th Street to Fort Hamilton. Initially, multiple stations along the extension were considered. This extension was to be the first part of an extension to Staten Island through a tunnel under The Narrows. On September 12, 1922, a meeting was held by the Transit Commission to determine whether a stop at 91st Street should be included as part of the planned extension. Ultimately, no station was built at 91st Street. At the meeting it was decided that money for an additional station in between 86th Street and the new terminal at 95th Street would be better spent on an extensive terminal with entrances at 93rd, 94th, and 95th Streets. On November 15, 1922, a report by the Chief Engineer recommended changing the plans of the Fourth Avenue Extension to provide for a third track between the 86th Street and 95th Street stations for train storage. The change was approved by the Transit Commission on November 22. Other extensions were also planned in 1922: a branch of the line running via 86th Street to 18th Avenue to connect with the New Utrecht Line to Coney Island, Route 19, and the future Tenth Avenue subway, and a branch of the line at 67th Street heading to Staten Island, Route 20.

On December 28, 1922, the Transit Commission announced that it had awarded the contract for the construction of a half-mile extension of the Fourth Avenue Line, Contract 11B, to T. A. Gillespie Company for $1.5 million. However, as the Board of Estimate failed to take action upon it, the contractor withdrew its bid on March 7, 1923. The Transit Commission blamed the Board of Estimate for delays in the awarding of the contract; the Commission said that the city would suffer a substantial loss due to increased construction costs, and because the contract that was given was "highly advantageous to the city." As part of Contract 11B, the extension was built with two tracks, with the exception of a short three-track stretch just north of the terminal at 95th Street. The extension was to be built with a provision to extend the line to Staten Island. As a result of a motion made by Commissioner LeRoy Harkness in front of the Transit Commission, the contract was set to be put back up for bid. On November 2, 1923, the Board of Estimate approved the contract for the line with T. A. Gillespie Company, the same contractor that had bid on the project earlier, but withdrew. The Transit Commission, due to the delay of the project, gave orders on November 3 to speed up the completion of the project. Construction began on December 17, 1923.

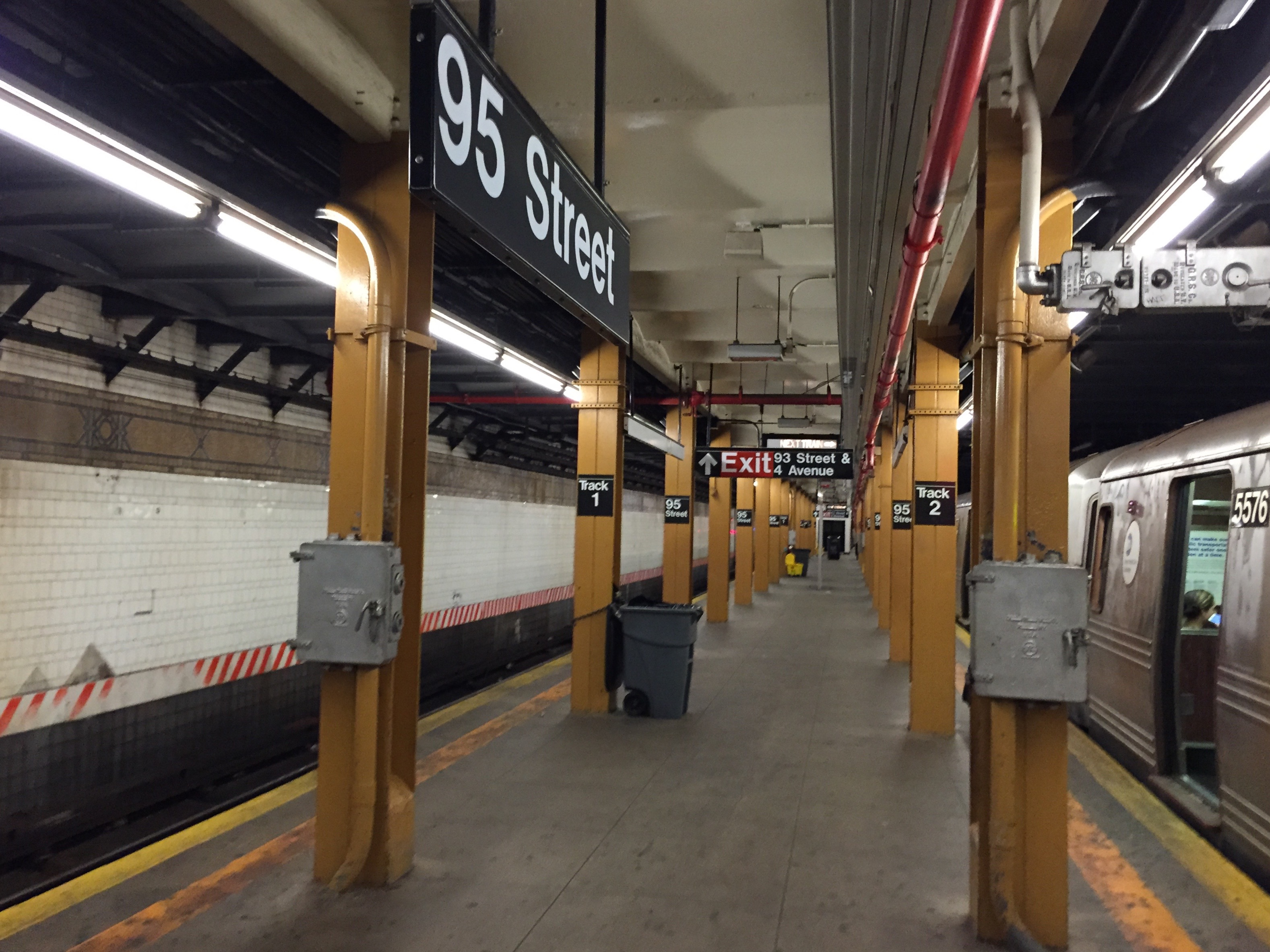
The Bay Ridge–95th Street terminal station was opened in 1925.

On February 16, 1925, the Board of Transportation directed its engineers to prepare plans to lengthen the platforms at twelve stations along the Fourth Avenue Line (Myrtle Avenue, DeKalb Avenue, Pacific Street, Union Street, Ninth Street, Prospect Avenue, 25th Street, 45th Street, 53rd Street, Bay Ridge Avenue, 77th Street, and 86th Street) to accommodate eight-car trains at the cost of $633,000. Later that month, on February 28, the Board made public the bids for the contract to complete the 95th Street terminal station. The station, as part of the contract, was built with two tracks, and was built to be 530 feet long to accommodate eight-car trains. A signal and switch tower, and a dispatcher's office was also built at the station. On April 22, 1925, it was announced that $200,000 had been appropriated by the BMT to pay for signal equipment, station control and lighting, drainage and ventilating equipment, and for telephone cables. The final extension to 95th Street, Route 18, opened on October 31, 1925. The platform extensions at the twelve Fourth Avenue Line stations, meanwhile, opened on August 1, 1927.

In February 1928, bids were received by the BOT on a project to remove kiosk subway entrances from the median of Fourth Avenue and to relocate them to the sidewalk to improve safety for transit riders. As part of the project, the station entrances at Pacific Street, along with at 36th Street and 59th Street, would be relocated. In addition, malls between 44th Street and 47th Street would be reduced in width, and the malls from 61st Street to 58th Street, and from 36th Street to Atlantic Avenue would be removed. Mezzanines would be constructed to allow riders to cross Fourth Avenue below street level. Work would be completed within six months.

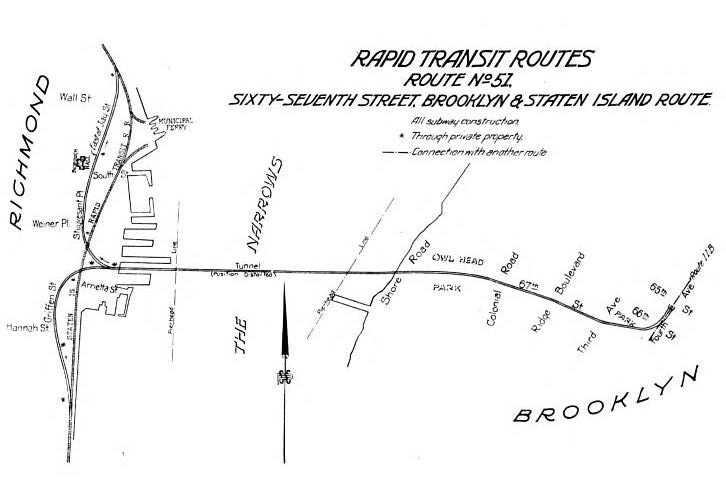
This proposed Staten Island Tunnel would have branched off at 66th Street.

The line was planned to be connected via one of two tunnels to Staten Island and to Staten Island Rapid Transit. The first would be in Bay Ridge, south of the 59th Street station, connecting to both SIRT branches near the Tompkinsville station. The other would have been south of 95th Street in Fort Hamilton, following the current routing of the Verrazzano–Narrows Bridge. Construction on the first plan, known as the Staten Island Tunnel was started in 1923 but soon halted. Later proposals called for connecting the line and the SIRT via the Verrazano Bridge, though the bridge was built with no railroad provisions. The SIRT ordered new train cars, the ME-1s, that were built to be compatible with operation over the BMT system, and as such, they strongly resembled the BMT's AB Standard.

=== Later years ===
==== Rebuilding DeKalb Avenue junction ====
The DeKalb Avenue Junction is located to the north and south of the DeKalb Avenue station, and it is located at the juncture of the BMT Fourth Avenue Line and the BMT Brighton Line on the south and the four Manhattan Bridge tracks and Montague Tunnel tracks on the north. In 1927, platform extensions were built at DeKalb Avenue in order to allow for longer trains. The extensions were built into a curve south of the station–they were closed in 1960 when they were replaced by straight extensions to the north. DeKalb Avenue received a new mezzanine with escalators at the north end of the station. From this mezzanine exits were built on both side of the Flatbush Avenue Extension between Fleet Street and Willoughby Street.

Until the mid-1950s, though, the extreme outside tracks in each direction hosted the Fourth Avenue Line local tracks and the next pair hosted the Brighton Line. The middle tracks, which bypassed the station, hosted the Fourth Avenue express tracks. A group of level crossovers at the northern end of the station allowed all tracks access to both sides of the Manhattan Bridge and to the Montague Street Tunnel. The Fourth Avenue local tracks led straight onto the Manhattan Bridge west of the station, while the Brighton line tracks led straight to the Montague Street Tunnel, so the crossovers allowed trains from both lines to switch between the bridge and the tunnel. This led to so many train delays on the Fourth Avenue and Brighton Lines that, in 1952, the junction was earmarked for "top priority" reconstruction.

During the reconstruction of the junction that started in 1956 and was completed by April 1961, the Brighton Line tracks were connected to the DeKalb Avenue station's outermost tracks. A diamond crossover north of the station had caused frequent bottlenecks, but was removed during the realignment and replaced with two flying junctions. All switches immediately north of the station were eliminated. The junction towards the Manhattan Bridge was rebuilt. To make room for a new flying junction, the Myrtle Avenue station was closed on July 16, 1956. That station's northbound platform remains visible from passing trains, but the southbound platform was demolished to accommodate the new flying junction that replaced the diamond crossover. Between 1957 and 1958, extra tracks and new switches were added south of DeKalb Avenue. Platforms were also doubled in length to accommodate ten-car trains of 60-foot-long (18 m) cars. It was estimated that the reconstruction of the junction increased the junction's train capacity by 25%. The Chrystie Street Connection project was also tied to this improvement, as it resulted in more trains using the bridge, as well as connecting trains to the IND Sixth Avenue Line (and thus, to IND lines to the Bronx and Queens).

On October 25, 1962, Mayor Robert F. Wagner Jr. requested that the New York City Board of Estimate approve an expenditure of $724,572 for the reconstruction of subway structures and entrances along the Fourth Avenue Line in order to accommodate the widening of Fourth Avenue between 60th Street and Atlantic Avenue, which was to be accomplished by narrowing the street's sidewalks. At the time of the request, 80% of the work on the project was completed. Work had started on the project, which cost $1 million, several months earlier. The contract that the Mayor had requested approval for would have relocated vault lights, gratings, entrances and exits at 56th Street and 49th Street, and at the 45th Street, 53rd Street and 59th Street stations.

==== Contemporary projects ====
Formerly, the Fourth Avenue Line served trains from the BMT Culver Line, which connected to the 36th Street station via the lower level of the Ninth Avenue station south of Green-Wood Cemetery from a now-demolished elevated structure. Following the connection of the Culver Line to the South Brooklyn Line of the IND on October 30, 1954, this service turned at Ditmas Avenue instead. Later on, service via the BMT Culver Line was cut back to being a shuttle that ran between Ditmas Avenue and Ninth Avenue. Shuttle service ended in 1975, with homes and housing developments erected over the right-of-way of the two demolished stations in the 1980s and again in the 2010s. The barest stub of the old elevated line is still visible at Ditmas Avenue.

In January 2017, the MTA revealed plans to rehabilitate the structure of the tunnel above the express tracks between 36th and 59th Streets. The structure had become corroded because resurfacing of Fourth Avenue in the 2010s caused rainwater to seep into the structure rather into the sewage system. Work will also be done between Atlantic Avenue–Barclays Center and 36th Streets. Construction started in May 2017, and will end in March 2020. As a result, starting July 30, 2018, N trains ran local along that section at all times. On July 29, 2019, N trains resumed running express in this section.

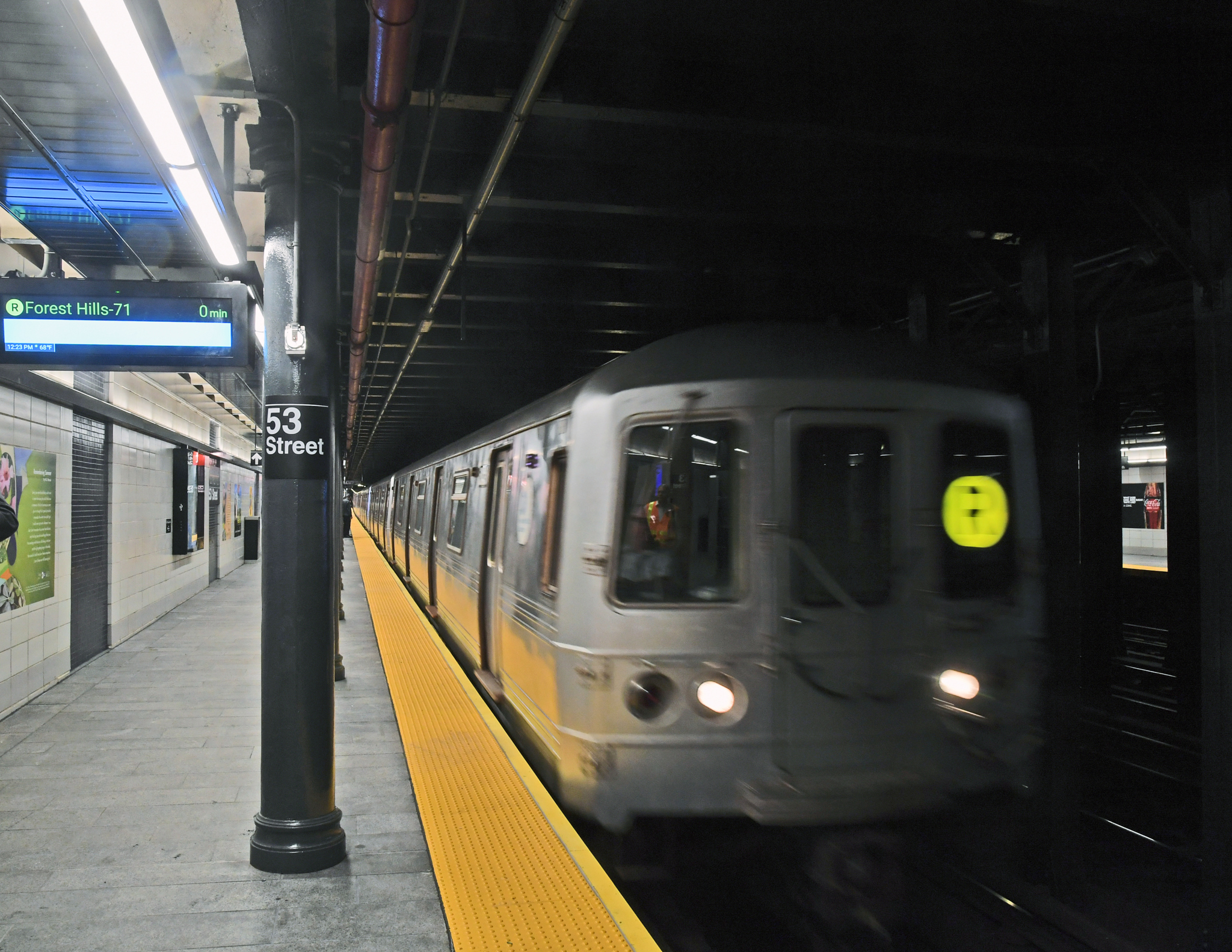
The renovated 53rd Street station

Under the 2015–2019 MTA Capital Plan's Enhanced Station Initiative, three stations on the line—Prospect Avenue, 53rd Street, and Bay Ridge Avenue—were selected to undergo a complete overhaul. All three stations would be entirely closed for up to 6 months in order to speed up renovations, unlike in previous station renovations conducted by the MTA, where parts of the stations would have been closed and renovated piece-by-piece. Updates included cellular service, Wi-Fi, USB charging stations, interactive service advisories and maps, improved signage, and improved station lighting. From January to May 2016, Grimshaw Architects worked on a design for the stations' renovation, with Arup Group acting as a consultant. The award for Package 1 of the renovations, which covers renovations at the three stations, was awarded on November 30, 2016. The stations were closed on a staggered schedule from March to June 2017 for these renovations, with 53rd Street closing first, followed by Bay Ridge Avenue and Prospect Avenue. They were planned to reopen on a staggered schedule from September to December 2017. 53rd Street reopened first on September 8, followed by Bay Ridge Avenue a month later on October 13. Prospect Avenue, the last of the three stations to be renovated, reopened a month ahead of schedule on November 2, 2017.

The 2015–2019 Capital Program also called for several stations to be renovated with elevators to bring them into compliance with the Americans with Disabilities Act of 1990. As of January 2019, only three stations on the BMT Fourth Avenue Line were ADA-accessible: Jay Street–MetroTech, DeKalb Avenue, and Atlantic–Barclays; all of these stops were in Downtown Brooklyn. The Capital Program would bring ADA-accessibility to at least two additional stations, 59th Street and 86th Street, with possible elevator installations in at least four other stations: Union Street, 36th Street, 77th Street, and Bay Ridge–95th Street.

== Station listing ==
Station service legend
Stops all times	Stops 24 hours a day
Stops all times except late nights	Stops every day during daytime hours only
Stops late nights only	Stops every day during overnight hours only
Stops late nights and weekends	Stops everyday during overnight hours and weekends during daytime hours only
Stops weekdays during the day	Stops during weekday daytime hours only
Stops rush hours only	Stops during weekday rush hours only
Time period details
Disabled access	Station is compliant with the Americans with Disabilities Act
↑	Station is compliant with the Americans with Disabilities Act in the indicated direction only
↓	Station is compliant with the Americans with Disabilities Act in the indicated direction only
	Elevator access to mezzanine only

Neighborhood (approximate)	Disabled access	Station	Tracks	Services	Opened	Transfers and notes
Montague Street Tunnel branch (N R W )
Downtown Brooklyn	Elevator access to mezzanine only	Court Street	local	N R W	August 1, 1920	2 3 (IRT Broadway–Seventh Avenue Line at Borough Hall); 4 5 (IRT Eastern Parkway Line at Borough Hall)
Downtown Brooklyn	Disabled access	Jay Street–MetroTech	local	N R W	June 11, 1924	formerly Lawrence Street; A C (IND Fulton Street Line); F <F> (IND Culver Line)
Downtown Brooklyn	Manhattan Bridge branch (B D N Q )					
Downtown Brooklyn		Myrtle Avenue	local		June 22, 1915	Closed on July 16, 1956; only Manhattan-bound platform remains
Downtown Brooklyn	Tunnel and Bridge tracks merge					
Downtown Brooklyn	Disabled access	DeKalb Avenue	bridge, tunnel	B D N Q R W	June 22, 1915	6 tracks; tunnel tracks and one set of bridge tracks stop at station; the other set of bridge tracks bypass through the middle
Downtown Brooklyn	bridge & tunnel tracks stopping at DeKalb Avenue split to the BMT Brighton Line (B Q ); bypass tracks continue as the BMT Fourth Avenue Line express tracks					
Downtown Brooklyn	Disabled access	Atlantic Avenue–Barclays Center	all	D N R W	June 22, 1915	2 3 4 5 (IRT Eastern Parkway Line); B Q (BMT Brighton Line); Connection to LIRR at Atlantic Terminal; Originally named "Pacific Street"
Park Slope		Union Street	local	D N R W	June 22, 1915	
Park Slope		Ninth Street	local	D N R W	June 22, 1915	F G (IND Culver Line at Fourth Avenue)
South Slope/Greenwood Heights		Prospect Avenue	local	D N R W	June 22, 1915	
South Slope/Greenwood Heights		25th Street	local	D N R W	June 22, 1915	
Sunset Park		36th Street	all	D N R W	June 22, 1915	
Sunset Park	split with BMT West End Line (D R W ) and former split with BMT Culver Line (abandoned)					
Sunset Park		45th Street	local	N R W	September 22, 1915	
Sunset Park		53rd Street	local	N R W	September 22, 1915	
Sunset Park	Disabled access	59th Street	all	N R W	June 22, 1915	
express tracks split off and become BMT Sea Beach Line (N W )
Bay Ridge		Bay Ridge Avenue	local	R	January 15, 1916	
Bay Ridge		77th Street	local	R	January 15, 1916	
Bay Ridge	Disabled access	86th Street	local	R	January 15, 1916	
Fort Hamilton	Disabled access	Bay Ridge–95th Street	local	R	October 31, 1925	
