= Myrtle Avenue station (BMT Fourth Avenue Line) =

Myrtle Avenue
- Former New York City Subway station
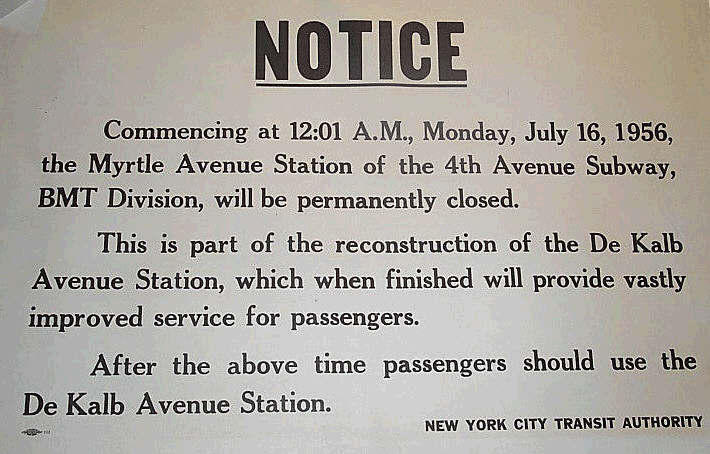
- Notice of the closing of Myrtle Avenue

Station statistics
- Address: Flatbush Avenue Extension and Myrtle Avenue; Brooklyn, New York
- Borough: Brooklyn
- Coordinates: 40.6937°N 73.9833°W
- Division: B (BMT)
- Line: BMT Fourth Avenue Line
- Services: None (abandoned)
- Structure: Underground
- Platforms: 1 side platform (2 when station was open)
- Tracks: 5 (4 when station was open)

Other information
- Opened: June 22, 1915; 111 years ago
- Closed: July 16, 1956; 70 years ago
- Former/other names: Gold Street

Station succession
- Next north: Canal Street (via Broadway Line); Grand Street (via Sixth Avenue Line); Chambers Street (via Nassau Loop) (tracks removed)
- Next south: DeKalb Avenue
Location
Location within New York City Subway
Location within New York City
Location within New York
Track layout
Street map

The Myrtle Avenue station was a local station on the Manhattan Bridge subway tracks (B, D, N, and Q trains) in Brooklyn, New York City, at the southern end of the bridge.

== History ==
This station opened on June 22, 1915, along with the rest of the BMT Fourth Avenue Line. The Myrtle Avenue station was sometimes called Gold Street in some early planning documents, and in the Brooklyn Daily Eagle when the station opened.

The city government took over the BMT's operations on June 1, 1940. The station closed on July 16, 1956 for the reconstruction of the flying junction north of DeKalb Avenue to increase capacity for the entire BMT Division. The Brooklyn-bound platform was removed completely, but the Manhattan-bound platform still exists. This station was a casualty of the rebuild. A new track had to be added on the west side to allow for a grade-separated crossing. The original southbound "local" track at the platform had to be depressed to a lower grade to cross under, and the new track wiped out the southbound platform. The northbound platform was left in place but no longer operated for passenger service.

There was a plan to build a loop just north of this station to turn back Fourth Avenue local trains from 95th Street. The bellmouths for the un-built loop can be seen just north of this station where the bypass tracks join the bridge tracks that stop at DeKalb Avenue.

The entrance to the station was from the inside of a building, and after the station was closed up, the connection was blocked off with a cinderblock wall. In 2007, the City allowed a developer that purchased the block above the station to demolish the access point to the station. A thick concrete wall now exists at the entrance to the platform.

== Masstransiscope ==
The Masstransiscope artwork

In 1980 the Masstransiscope zoetrope artwork by Bill Brand was installed in the station. The artwork consists of 228 hand-painted panels that are behind a long slit light box. The artwork stretches for the full 300 feet of the platform. On September 17, 1980, passengers could start seeing the completed work from trains. This allows riders on the Manhattan-bound B and Q trains (and D trains during late nights when they stop at DeKalb Avenue) right before the bridge to look to their right and experience the illusion that the paintings are moving. By the mid-1980s, despite Brand's efforts to maintain the artwork, it fell into a state of disrepair. It was briefly repaired in about 1990, but it was soon covered in graffiti. After falling into a state of disrepair, graffiti was removed in 2008 and the artwork was restored. Masstransiscope was again covered by graffiti during the complete subway shutdown during Hurricane Sandy and again restored after that.

Originally, Brand came up with a more ambitious plan using blown up photographs to create a virtual film strip–these would have been regularly swapped out.

== Station layout ==
When open, this underground station had four tracks and two side platforms. The southbound local side platform was demolished to make way for the new fifth track.
