= Grand Street station (IND Sixth Avenue Line) =

New York City Subway station in Manhattan

Grand Street
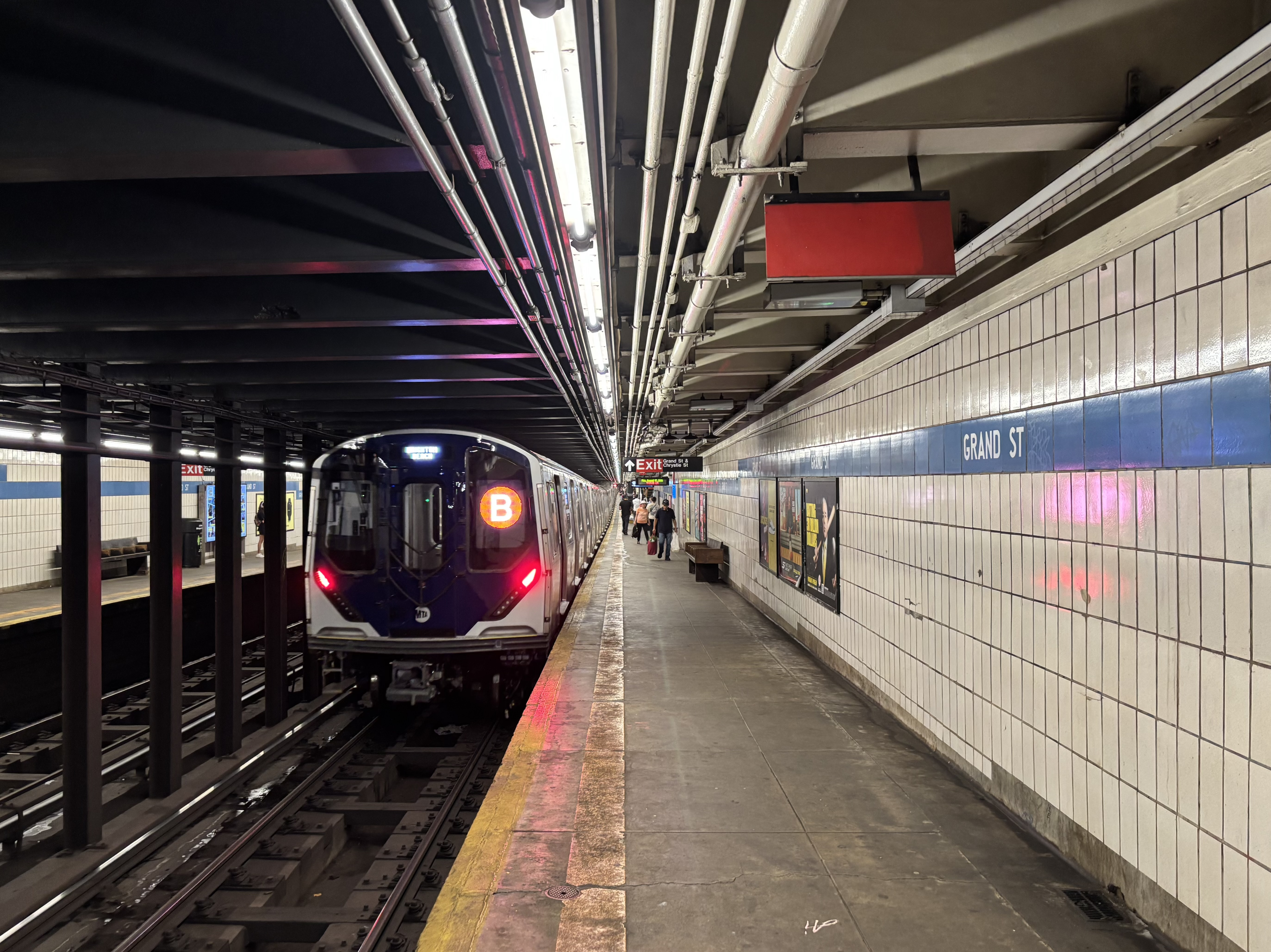
- R211A B train departing from the southbound platform

Station statistics
- Address: Grand Street and Chrystie Street; New York, New York
- Borough: Manhattan
- Locale: Chinatown, Lower East Side
- Coordinates: 40.718119°N 73.993864°W
- Division: B (IND)
- Line: IND Sixth Avenue Line
- Services: B (weekdays during the day); D (all times)
- Transit: NYCT Bus: M15, M15 SBS (on Allen Street); M103 (on Bowery)
- Structure: Underground
- Platforms: 2 side platforms
- Tracks: 2

Other information
- Opened: November 26, 1967; 58 years ago
- Accessibility: Same-platform transfer available

Traffic
- 2025: 6,001,384 ▲1.7%
- Rank: 48 out of 423
Services
| Preceding station | New York City Subway | Following station |
|---|---|---|
| Broadway–Lafayette Street B D via 59th Street–Columbus Circle | Express | Atlantic Avenue–Barclays Center D toward Coney Island–Stillwell Avenue |
| Broadway–Lafayette Street B D via 59th Street–Columbus Circle | Local | DeKalb Avenue B D toward Brighton Beach |
Non-revenue services and lines
| Preceding station | New York City Subway | Following station |
|---|---|---|
| | no service | Myrtle Avenue Fourth Ave local; demolished |
Location
Location within New York City Subway
Location within New York City
Location within New York
Track layout
Street map
Station service legend
| Symbol | Description |
| Stops all times except late nights | Stops all times except late nights |
| Stops all times | Stops all times |
| Stops late nights only | Stops late nights only |
| Stops weekdays during the day | Stops weekdays during the day |

Grand Street station is a station on the IND Sixth Avenue Line of the New York City Subway. Located at the intersection of Grand Street and Chrystie Street at the border of Chinatown and the Lower East Side, it is served by the D train at all times and the B train on weekdays.

Opened on November 26, 1967, this station was one of two added as part of the Chrystie Street Connection. The station has two tracks and two narrow side platforms, located approximately 30 feet (9.1 m) below ground. In the original plan for the station, this would have been a four-track, two-island platform station, with a transfer to the Second Avenue Subway. The fourth phase of the Second Avenue Subway, if built, would include new platform(s) with connections to the existing platforms.

== History ==
=== Construction ===
The station was built as part of the Chrystie Street Connection between the Sixth Avenue Line and the Manhattan and Williamsburg Bridges. The Chrystie Street Connection was first proposed in 1947 as the southern end of the Second Avenue Subway (SAS), which would feed into the two bridges, allowing Sixth Avenue Line trains to access the Jamaica, Fourth Avenue, and Brighton lines in Brooklyn. The New York City Board of Estimate voted in September 1951 to construct the Second Avenue Subway and several related lines for $500 million. The next year, the New York City Board of Transportation (BOT) indicated that it would award contracts for the construction of an 890-foot-long (270 m) section of tunnel between Hester and Delancey Streets, including a station at Grand Street, as part of the SAS project. Work had been expected to begin in mid-1952 but was delayed because of engineering difficulties. By 1954, the BOT's successor, the New York City Transit Authority, had asked the city for $37.3 million to begin constructing the Chrystie Street Connection.

In mid-1957, the New York City government solicited bids from contractors to construct the various parts of the connection. One of the contracts was for the construction of a station at Grand and Chrystie Streets, serving trains to and from the Manhattan Bridge. Because there was a large number of senior citizens living near that intersection, the station was originally planned to contain many ramps and "a minimum of steps". That October, the Board of Estimate approved an initial $10.2 million for the connection. A groundbreaking ceremony for the connection took place on November 25, 1957. The connection was projected to cost $100 million and provide capacity for 52,000 more riders an hour between Brooklyn and Manhattan. In 1960, New York City Transit allocated $23 million for the installation of new signals in the Chrystie Street tunnels and six other locations in the subway system.

Construction of the station started in 1962, and the entire seven-block length of Chrystie Street was closed until 1964. By March 1964, the new connection was expected to be completed within the next year. Later that year, the tracks in the new connection were laid. In contrast to subway tracks on existing lines, which contained wooden cross ties, the new tracks were installed on rubber pads attached to the concrete track bed, thereby dampening noise from trains. Lighting, power and signal equipment for the Chrystie Street tunnel had been installed by January 1965. At that time, the project was projected to be completed in 1967, with the portion involving the opening of the Grand Street station to be finished in 1966.

=== Opening and use ===
The first part of the connection, including the Grand Street station, opened on November 26, 1967, when the link between the Sixth Avenue Line and the Manhattan Bridge north tracks opened. The connection was fully opened on July 1, 1968, with the opening of the 57th Street station and the opening of the connection between the Sixth Avenue Line and the Williamsburg Bridge.

With the connection completed, the most significant service changes ever carried out in the subway's history were introduced. Upon this station's opening the routes of the B and D were rerouted via the new connection. BB trains were relabeled the B, and began to run to Coney Island via the Chrystie Street Connection, the Manhattan Bridge north tracks, Fourth Avenue Line express tracks, and the West End Line. D trains were rerouted from the Culver Line to run to Coney Island via the new Sixth Avenue express tracks, the Chrystie Street Connection, the Manhattan Bridge north tracks, and the Brighton Line.

=== Manhattan Bridge closures ===
The north Manhattan Bridge tracks were closed for repairs from April 1986 to December 1988. During this time, this station was served by the Grand Street Shuttle to the Sixth Avenue Line, and there was no subway service from the station to Brooklyn. The Grand Street Shuttle also operated when the north tracks were closed again from April to November 1995; the closure caused nearby vendors' business to decline. A third entrance was added in 1999 to accommodate the station's growing ridership, which in turn was spurred by the growth of the Chinese population in New York City. At the time, the Grand Street station was one of two subway stations in Manhattan's Chinatown, with subway service running directly to the Chinatowns in Brooklyn.

The MTA proposed closing the Manhattan Bridge's northern tracks again in 2000, running a shuttle between Broadway–Lafayette Street and Grand Street. Many Chinese New Yorkers expressed opposition to the plans, as there would no longer be direct subway service between Grand Street and Brooklyn. The New York Times wrote that many of the station's 27,000 daily riders were "Chinese- Americans who live in Brooklyn, come for fresh fish and produce, herbal medicines and household supplies", and that community members feared a decline in business when the Manhattan Bridge's north tracks closed. The Grand Street Shuttle began operating again when the north tracks were closed in July 2001. The MTA also agreed to operate a shuttle bus to the Canal Street station when the bridge's northern tracks were closed in 2001. Regular service was restored in February 2004.

== Station layout ==
The Grand Street station has two tracks and two narrow side platforms, located approximately 30 feet (9.1 m) below ground. They are column-less, except at staircases, and have a blue trim line with "GRAND ST" in white sans-serif font on it at regular intervals. The station is served by the D at all times and by the B only on weekdays during the day. The next stop to the south is DeKalb Avenue for B and nighttime D trains and Atlantic Avenue–Barclays Center for daytime D trains. The next stop to the north is Broadway–Lafayette Street for all service.

In the original plan for the station, this would have been a four-track, two-island platform station; the Second Avenue Subway would have served the outer tracks while the Sixth Avenue Line served the inner tracks, providing a cross-platform interchange between these two lines. Although the connection only served Sixth Avenue Line trains, it was essentially the first part of the Second Avenue line that had been constructed. There is a sole mezzanine at the center of the station which has two staircases to each platform, a turnstile bank, token booth, and access to the street exits.

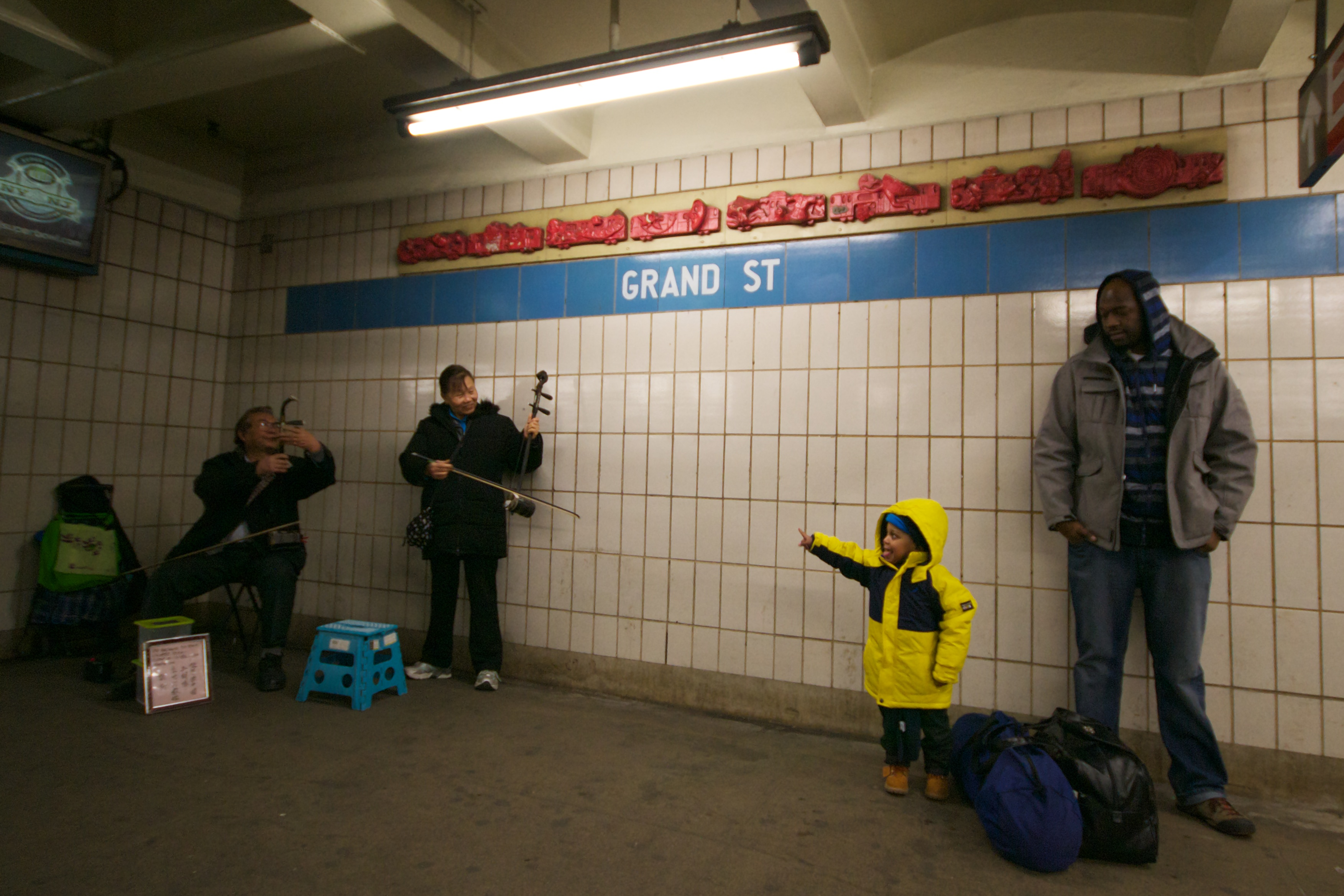
Musicians playing huqin for passengers in the station; behind them is the Trains of Thought frieze

On the Brooklyn-bound side, there is a small sign reading "Change Radio Channel to B1", indicating that train operators must change the channel on their cab radio from B2 (IND) to B1 (BMT) before crossing the Manhattan Bridge, due to the switch to BMT tracks south of here. Southbound trains leaving this station cross over the north side of the bridge and arrive at DeKalb Avenue or Atlantic Avenue–Barclays Center (via the DeKalb Avenue bypass tracks). As the tracks curve onto the bridge, trackways from Canal Street on the Manhattan Bridge branch of the BMT Broadway Line are visible. The north side of the bridge originally led to that station before the current alignment was completed in 1967.

=== Artwork ===
A painted frieze called Trains of Thought by Andrea Gardner and Sally Heller was installed at the mezzanine and platforms in the late 1990s as the "Creative Stations" program sponsored by the Lower Manhattan Cultural Council. It features red clay models of R62s and R62As mounted on wood.

=== Exits ===
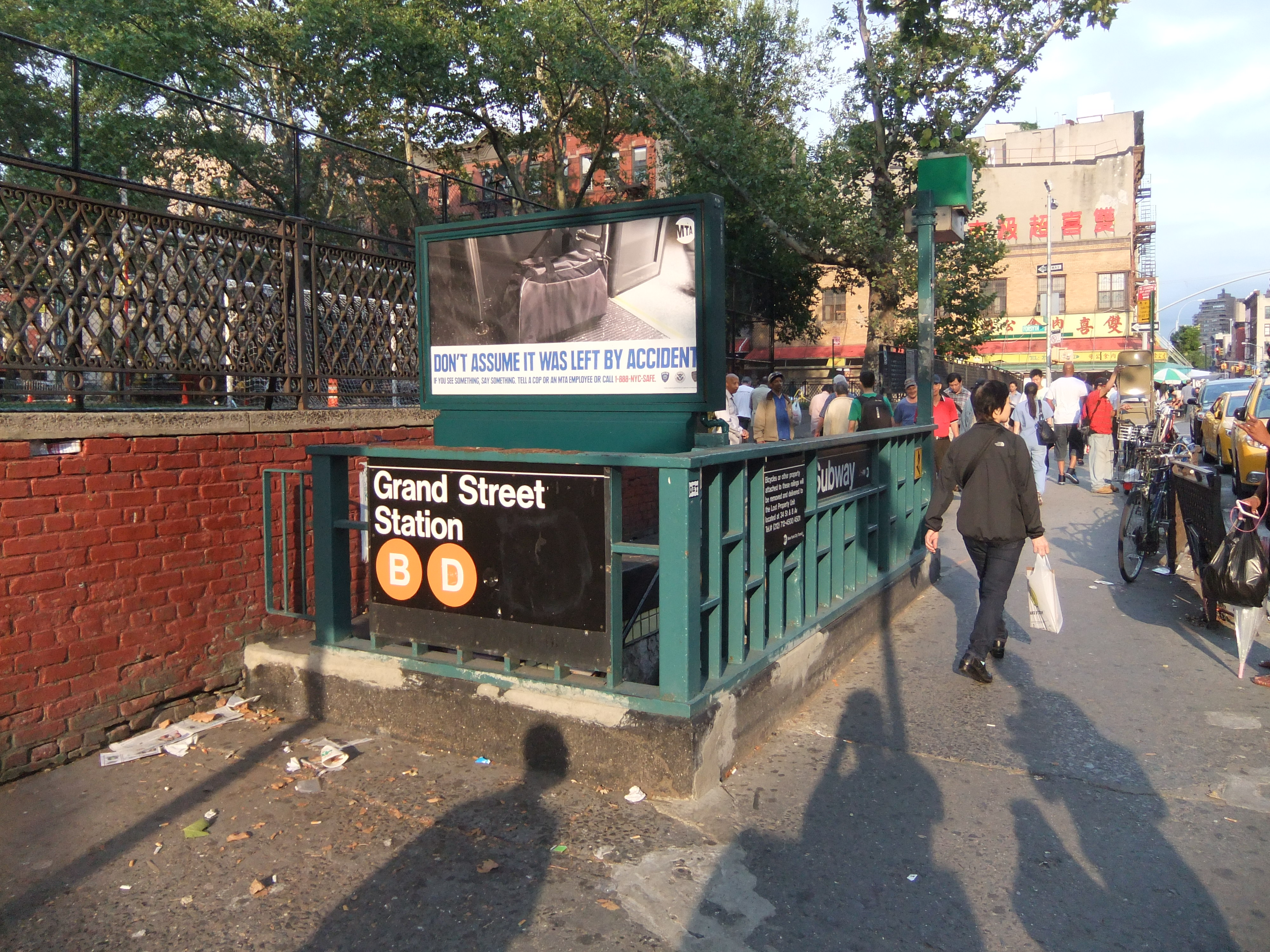
1960s-era entrance at the northeast corner of Chrystie Street and Grand Street

There are three staircase exits: two going up to the northeastern corner of the intersection of Grand and Chrystie Streets, and one going up to the northwestern corner. The station originally only had the two street stairs to the northeastern corner of the intersection, but due to growing ridership over the years—mainly by commuters from various Brooklyn neighborhoods to Manhattan's Chinatown—the third staircase to the northwestern corner was added in 1999.

== Second Avenue Subway plans ==
In addition to connecting the BMT Nassau Street and IND Sixth Avenue Lines, as well as the Sixth Avenue Line to the Manhattan Bridge, the Chrystie Street Connection is one of the few completed sections of the SAS. The Grand Street station was built to serve as a transfer point between the Sixth Avenue and Second Avenue lines. The connection was built this way because the original 1960s plans for the SAS had Second Avenue and Sixth Avenue Line trains sharing two island platforms in a four-track layout, with connections from the Second Avenue Line to the Sixth Avenue Line and the Manhattan Bridge. Because Second Avenue Subway construction was halted in 1975, this station has only served Sixth Avenue Line trains since its opening. As part of the contemporary construction of the Second Avenue Subway, a new station is planned for construction below the current station during the fourth and final phase of the project; Phase 1 of the project on the Upper East Side opened on January 1, 2017, with Phase 2 in planning and two other phases with no funding commitments.

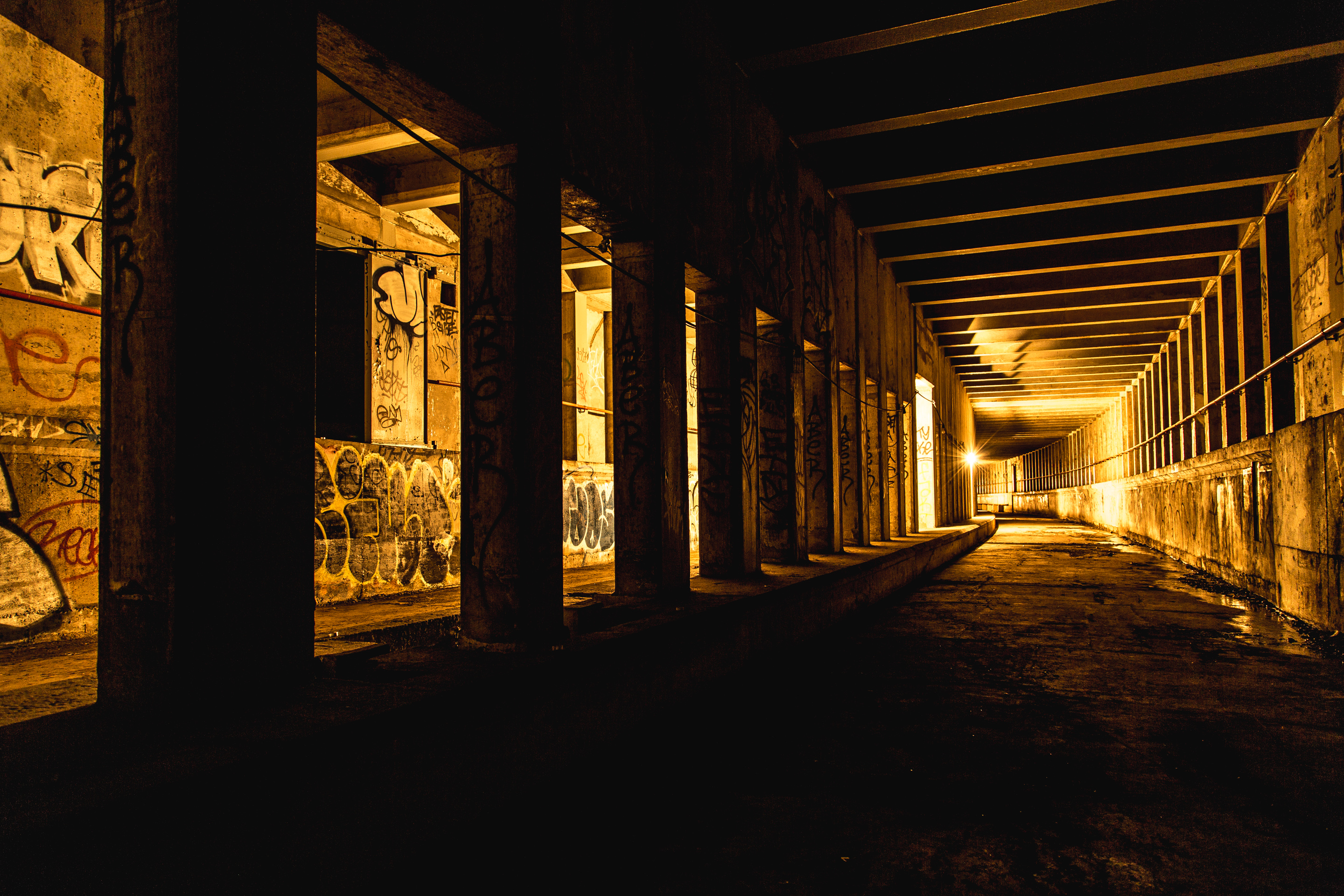
An abandoned segment of the Second Avenue Subway located just south of Grand Street

During modern planning, it was considered to utilize the cross-platform provision, known as the "Shallow Chrystie Option", or to place the tracks under Forsyth Street one block east (the Forsyth Option), both of which could tie into an existing tunnel near the Chatham Square station site south of Canal Street. This tunnel, known as the Confucius Plaza Tunnel, was built in the 1970s along with several sections in Upper Manhattan used for Phases 1 and 2 of the SAS. Both these options would require extensive usage of cut-and-cover construction methods, creating large amounts of disturbances to the local community, environmental issues, and possibly requiring the demolition of existing structures.

Current plans, however, have the Second Avenue platform to be built below the current one, though a free transfer will still be provided. The "Deep Chrystie Option", as the selected proposal is called, would instead place the Second Avenue Subway platform below the Sixth Avenue Line tracks, to create the least amount of community disturbance by utilizing tunnel boring machines. Cut-and-cover methods would be utilized only at the station site. The current platforms would be widened to create space for staircases to a new intermediate mezzanine between the two levels. This new mezzanine level will also include a new fare control area with staircases, escalators and elevators leading to two new station entrances/exits, with one on either side of Grand Street between Chrystie and Forsyth Streets. The Second Avenue Subway platform and the new entrances/exits would be ADA accessible. To the north of the station, the Second Avenue Subway tunnels would curve to travel under Sara D. Roosevelt Park rather than directly below the Sixth Avenue Line tunnels under Chrystie Street, to avoid steel piles and other obstructions dating from the construction of the Chrystie Street Connection. To the south, the unused tunnel between Pell and Canal Streets could be used as an ancillary facility with the new passenger-service tunnels located beneath and slightly to the west.
