= Staten Island Tunnel =

Incomplete rail tunnel in New York City

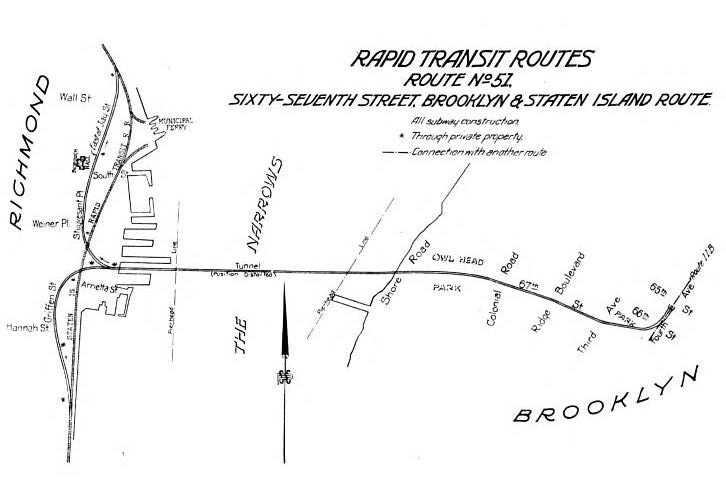
- The 1912 plans of the Staten Island Tunnel to link the Staten Island Railroad to the BMT Fourth Avenue Line.
- Interactive map of Staten Island Tunnel

Overview
- Official name: Brooklyn-Richmond Freight and Passenger Tunnel
- Line: BMT Fourth Avenue Line; IND Culver Line; Staten Island Railway
- Location: New York City
- Coordinates: 40°38′26″N 74°02′08″W
- Status: Unfinished
- System: New York City Subway
- Start: Bay Ridge, Brooklyn
- End: St. George or Tompkinsville, Staten Island

Operation
- Constructed: 1923–1925
- Traffic: Rapid Transit

Technical
- Design engineer: Arthur S. Tuttle
- Length: 10,400 feet (3,169.9 m) (planned)
- Width: 24 feet (7.3 m)

The Staten Island Tunnel is an abandoned, incomplete railway and subway tunnel in Staten Island, New York City. It was intended to connect railways on Staten Island (precursors to the modern-day Staten Island Railway) to the BMT Fourth Avenue Line of the New York City Subway, in Brooklyn, via a new crossing under the Narrows. Planned to extend 10,400 feet (3,200 m), the tunnel would have been among the world's longest at the time of its planning, in the late 19th and early 20th centuries.

Construction began in 1923, and the tunnel was excavated 150 feet (46 m) into the Narrows before New York City Mayor John Hylan, a former Brooklyn–Manhattan Transit Corporation (BMT) employee and initial proponent of the tunnel, canceled the project in 1925. The tunnel lies dormant under Owl's Head Park in Bay Ridge, Brooklyn. Later proposals to complete the tunnel, including the 1939 plans for the Independent Subway System's ambitious Second System, were never funded.

Modern proposals for completion of the tunnel have come from New York City Councilman Lewis Fidler, who in 2007 proposed a 0.33% tax for the tri-state region to pay for the construction. The tunnel was listed as one of many projects that could receive federal funds that were to have been allocated to the Access to the Region's Core tunnel, which was canceled in October 2010. State Senator Diane Savino was among the supporters of the tunnel; Savino stated that if built, the tunnel would cost $3 billion and would improve quality of life for Staten Islanders, reduce traffic, and increase the attractiveness of the borough for investment.

== Other names ==
Officially called the Brooklyn-Richmond Freight and Passenger Tunnel, the Staten Island Tunnel was also to be referred to by four other names:

- The Narrows Tunnel, after the Narrows, the body of water it was supposed to run under;
- The Saint George Tunnel, after one of its terminals in St. George, Staten Island (not to be confused with the tunnel between the terminal and the Tompkinsville station);
- The Hylan Tunnel, after former New York City Mayor John Hylan, who oversaw the project. It has also been referred to as Hylan's Holes in both derogatory and endearing contexts.

== Original plans ==
In 1888, subsequent to building the Arthur Kill swing bridge between New Jersey and northwestern Staten Island, the Baltimore & Ohio Railroad (the owners of the Staten Island Railway until 1971) proposed a tunnel between Staten Island and Brooklyn. In 1890, Staten Island developer Erastus Wiman, who controlled the railway, sponsored a plan by the Baltimore and Ohio Railroad to construct a tunnel under the Narrows to connect Staten Island with Brooklyn for both passenger and freight service. The proposal never made it through the approval process when financial challenges stopped the plan at the drawing board. The tunnel would have gone near the foot of Vanderbilt Avenue on Staten Island to Bay Ridge in Brooklyn, traveling 1 1/4 miles (2.0 km) at a depth of 35 feet (11 m) below the narrows. There would have been two lines of tunneling, parallel and close together. Wiman believed that the tunneling would cost $5 million and that with the connecting road, the total cost was estimated at $6 million.

A rapid transit route to connect Staten Island to the remainder of New York City was proposed in 1912, in conjunction with the Dual Contracts of the New York City Subway. At the time, there were no vehicular or rail connections between Staten Island and the other four boroughs; the only connection was by ferry. Although not funded by the city, the tunnel was expected to help expand the then-sparsely populated borough in a similar manner to the population and development explosions seen in Brooklyn and the Bronx.

Under the Dual Contracts, three routes were proposed—two to Brooklyn and one to Manhattan—which would connect the Staten Island Railway's rapid transit service (SIRT) to existing subway lines.

=== Manhattan route ===
The Manhattan proposal, often called the "direct route," would have connected with the Interborough Rapid Transit Company (IRT)'s lines under Battery Park, near the current Brooklyn–Battery Tunnel. "Direct Route A" would have utilized a five-section tunnel under the New York Harbor, while "Direct Route B" would have used a partially-elevated route running along the eastern coastline of New Jersey (near Greenville and Bayonne). Both Manhattan plans would have required connections to various points, including Ellis Island or Governors Island, and would have traveled around 5 miles (8.0 km) without any stops. Because of this, the high costs of the potential tunnel, and the relatively small population of Staten Island, the Manhattan route was considered impractical. Another 5-mile tunnel to Battery Park was proposed by the city in the 1950s, but the plan was scrapped due to a lack of funding.

=== Brooklyn routes ===
Both of the shorter, Brooklyn proposals would have connected to the Brooklyn–Manhattan Transit Corporation (BMT)'s Fourth Avenue subway, constructed in 1914 during the Dual Contracts.

The first route would have originated in Bay Ridge, Brooklyn at a point between 65th and 67th Streets (just south of 59th Street Station), running to Arrietta Street in Tompkinsville, Staten Island near the Tompkinsville Station and one stop away from the Saint George Terminal. This plan, referred to as "Route No. 51" under the Dual Contracts, would have had connections going north towards St. George and along the North Shore Branch towards Arlington, and south towards Tottenville on the Main Line and Wentworth Avenue along the South Beach Branch. This proposal was estimated to cost $12 million in the year 1912, with half of it to be paid by railroads, such as the Pennsylvania Railroad (which operated the Long Island Rail Road) and the Baltimore and Ohio Railroad (which operated the SIRT). A major part of the 1912 proposal was the inclusion of two 40-inch water mains, which were to be side by side and were to be installed by the Department of Water Supply, Gas and Electricity alongside the tubes. These mains were intended to carry water from the main New York City supply to Staten Island.

The second route would have originated in Fort Hamilton at the south end of the line. Similar to the 1890 proposal, it would have followed the routing of the current Verrazzano–Narrows Bridge (constructed from 1959 to 1964). The Fort Hamilton proposal was the shortest route of the two, though it would require tunneling through deeper waters. As part of the proposal, it was suggested that the Fourth Avenue Line be extended past its original terminal at 86th Street in Bay Ridge to a temporary ferry terminal at 95th Street (now the 95th Street Station).

In anticipation of the northern tunnel route, trackways were constructed diverging from both Fourth Avenue local tracks towards the tunnel site south of the 59th Street Station. An additional portal was built in the SIRT tunnel between St. George Terminal and Tompkinsville to facilitate the northern wye from the tunnel to the North Shore Branch. As a provision for the southern route, the Fourth Avenue line south of 59th Street (built with only two tracks) was placed on the west side of Fourth Avenue, which would allow two additional tracks to be added on the east side of the street to facilitate a future express service from Staten Island.

== Groundbreaking and stoppage of construction ==
=== Selection of Bay Ridge-based plan ===
The Bay Ridge-based plan was ultimately selected, running between 65th Street/Shore Road in Brooklyn and the St. George Ferry Terminal in Staten Island. The two tubes would have been 10,400 feet (3,200 m) long, longer than any tunnel in the United States at that time. Portions of the Bay Ridge tunnel would be constructed using a tunnelling shield, while the remainder would be placed in a trench at the bottom of the Narrows. In the final plans, each tunnel was designed to be 24 feet (7.3 m) wide to accommodate freight cars in addition to passenger service, with freight trains coming from the Long Island Rail Road (LIRR)'s Bay Ridge Branch (terminating just north of the tunnel site) and the Staten Island Railway's connection with rail lines from New Jersey.

Alternate plans included constructing two sets of two tubes, one for commuter and freight service from the LIRR and the other for rapid transit, or two tunnels each with individual tubes for freight and subway service. The freight service would have occurred during off-peak hours only, but simultaneous with subway service, with passenger trains running in 30-minute or one-hour headways during these times. A 1912 proposal had freight running at night between 1 a.m. and 5 a.m., while the 1925 plans called for joint freight and passenger service during early mornings (5 a.m. to 6 a.m.), middays (10 a.m. to 4 p.m.), and overnights (8 p.m. to 5 a.m.).

At the time of the tunnel's groundbreaking, Jamaica Bay and the Paerdegat Basin were slated to become industrial complexes, which would have been facilitated by freight service from the tunnel. The tunnel plan was amended in 1919. In April 1921, a bill was passed in the state senate requiring the city to begin construction of the 24-foot-wide (7.3 m) tunnel within two years.

=== 1922 plan ===
In May 1922, John Hylan launched a new plan for the freight and passenger tunnel, and the Board of Estimate recommended that $4.08 million be initially appropriated for the project. The Transit Commission and the Port Authority refused to accept the plan, as they each had their own plans. This plan was much less extensive than the original plan. The original plan would have had the tunnel from Owl's Head Park under the Narrows to Staten Island, and then continuing to a freight yard to be built in the center of Staten Island, from which a trunk line would run across the Arthur Kill to New Jersey as far as Paterson, before merging with the West Shore Railroad. The new revised plan would only cover the Narrows Tunnel, and a three-mile spur to Arlington Yard.

Under the new plan, freight would still only operate at night through the tunnel. Spurs connecting the tunnel in Brooklyn to the Long Island freight belt line, to the B&O freight sidings on Staten Island, and to the new city piers on Staten Island would have all been built. The project was projected to cost $60 million and if the job was done quickly, it could have been done by 1929. The route would help develop the waterfront areas in Staten Island and Jamaica Bay. Provisions would be made for connections with the subway system's Fourth Avenue Line, even though the Transit Commission refused to be involved with the plans.

Since the plan would benefit the Baltimore and Ohio Railroad, the Pennsylvania Railroad opposed it, and the railroad, cooperating with the Port Authority, proposed a tunnel from Brooklyn to Greenville, New Jersey, with a spur to Staten Island. The situation become complicated, as the Port Authority plan was approved by the State Legislatures in both New Jersey and New York. In addition, the Transit Commission proposed its own subway tunnel branching from the Fourth Avenue Line to be operated as part of the city's subway system.

=== Groundbreaking and preparations ===
A groundbreaking ceremony was held by New York City Mayor John Hylan on April 14, 1923 in Bay Ridge and in Staten Island on July 19. Headings were dug and tunneling shafts were sunk at 68th Street and Shore Road in Brooklyn (the Shore Road Shaft), and underneath the Saint George Terminal in Staten Island (the South Street Shaft), costing a total of $1 million. On March 4, 1924, one of the caissons for the tunnel was sunk. In addition, in preparation for the tunnel, the SIRT purchased one hundred ME-1 subway cars built to BMT specifications and electrified its three passenger branches. The impending completion of the tunnel also sparked real estate interests in Staten Island.

=== Construction halted ===
In 1925, however—the year bids from contractors were to be entertained by the city—the project was halted and the project's engineering staff laid off. Officially, the plan was delayed due to lack of funding, but Hylan and New York City Board of Transportation (BOT) Chairman John Delaney also wanted to secure freight service for the tunnel. The status of the tunnel as mixed-use created tension and deadlock between Hylan, Delaney and the New York State Transit Commission; the latter emphasized passenger service for the tunnel. After an investigation issued by Governor Al Smith, planners eliminated freight service from the plan, as per the Nicoll-Hofstadter Act signed into law by the governor; this then led to lack of interest from contractors.

With the tunnel now designated exclusively for subway service, Mayor Hylan, a former Brooklyn–Manhattan Transit Corporation (BMT) employee who was a known opponent of both the BMT and the IRT, supposedly stopped the project as part of an overall effort to cripple the two private subway companies and promote the plans for the city-operated Independent Subway System (IND). It was also reported that Governor Smith, who had a financial stake in the Pennsylvania Railroad company, tried to stall the project in order to prevent the expansion of Baltimore and Ohio Railroad operations farther into the city. The stoppage was also attributed to the political rivalry between Hylan and Smith, who were both members of Tammany Hall's Democratic Party.

Nonetheless, on October 2, 1925, the 95th Street subway station, which was built mainly in anticipation for the Staten Island Tunnel, was opened. The station was built with a false wall at its south end, intended for either a planned extension to 100th or 101st Streets or a line leading to a future Fort Hamilton-based tunnel.

== Completion proposals ==
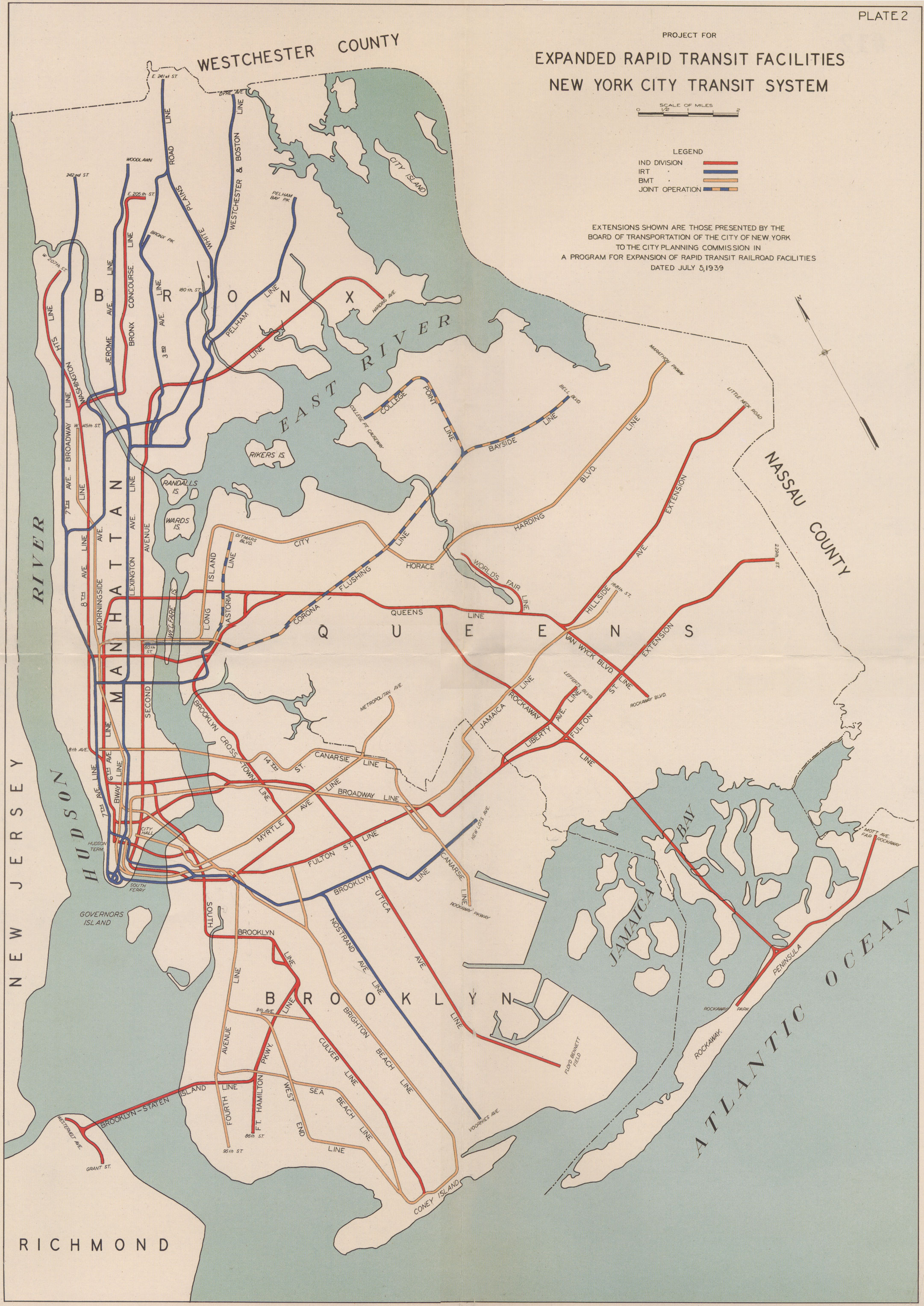
The 1939 IND Second System plan, showing the proposed Staten Island Tunnel connection with the IND Culver Line.

The tunnel had gone only 150 feet (46 m) into the Narrows before it was halted; multiple proposals have resurfaced to complete the tunnel. The tunnel and the Shore Road tunneling shafts currently lie dormant under Owl's Head Park in Bay Ridge. The South Street Shaft in Staten Island was filled in 1946 during post-World War II renovations of Saint George Terminal.

The IND Second System proposal from 1929 estimated that the cost of the southern tunnel route from Fort Wadsworth, Staten Island, to Fort Hamilton would cost upward of $75 million, though the tunnel was not officially part of the subway plans and was illustrated as a vehicular tunnel on the map of the plans. Many of the proposals were part of this ambitious expansion plan, which would have connected the tunnel to the IND South Brooklyn Line (today's IND Culver Line). An updated proposal in 1931 had the connection to the IND at the current Smith-Ninth Streets station, with the tunnel traveling north from Staten Island through Red Hook and Gowanus. Yet another update, from 1933, was projected to cost $45 million, running the original route between Saint George and 67th Street in Bay Ridge. The line would then run on Second Avenue north through the Bay Ridge Flats on Brooklyn's western shore, meeting up with the Culver Line near Hamilton Avenue (the current Gowanus Expressway) between the Smith-Ninth Streets and Fourth Avenue stations; it was suggested that the Hylan tunnel shafts be used. An application for a $47 million loan for this extension was approved by the Board of Estimate in 1937.

A revised Second System plan, drawn up in 1939 after the completion of the South Brooklyn line, followed the original Bay Ridge plan, and would have also extended the IND down Fort Hamilton Parkway and/or 10th Avenue to meet up with the tunnel route. The IND connection would be located at either the Fort Hamilton Parkway station (where the express tracks of the line run on a separate level) or the Church Avenue express station, the former terminus of the line. The Church Avenue connection would have utilized the lower level yard just south of the station, currently used to relay terminating G trains. None of these plans were ever funded, due to the onset of the Great Depression and, subsequently, World War II.

In 1945, the tunnel between New Brighton and the BMT Fourth Avenue Line in Brooklyn was submitted by the Board of Transportation to the City Planning Commission as part of the 1946 budget, this time costing $50.61 million. Later in 1945, according to a report by Mayor Fiorello H. La Guardia's special committee on transportation requirements of the Borough of Richmond, it was deemed that a tunnel to Staten Island from Manhattan was "unthinkable" and that a tunnel between Brooklyn and Staten Island was "not feasible now but must wait ten years". Robert Moses, who was the chairman of the committee and a known mass transit opponent, said that the best hope for improved transportation between Staten Island and Brooklyn and Manhattan was the reconstruction of the Saint George Terminal, the placing of more and better boats between Staten Island and Manhattan, resumption of 24-hour ferry service between 39th Street in Brooklyn and Staten Island, and the construction of ramps to the Gowanus elevated improvement at 39th Street.

More recently, the Verrazzano–Narrows Bridge, built from 1959 to 1964, had been proposed to serve as the rail link. The 95th Street station was slated to be connected to the bridge, one of the world's longest suspension bridges, because it followed the route of the planned tunnel. However, no space for any tracks was ever built because of Moses's opposition to the expansion of New York City public transportation.

Modern proposals for completion of the tunnel have come from New York City Councilman Lewis A. Fidler, who in 2007 proposed a one-third of one percent tax for the tri-state region to pay for the construction. The tunnel was one of several projects that could have competed for $3 billion of federal funds that were to have been allocated to the ARC tunnel, which was canceled by New Jersey governor Chris Christie in October 2010. State Senator Diane Savino, whose district includes parts of Staten Island and Brooklyn, supported such a plan, saying, "The MTA should complete a 1912 plan that would have rail and freight access from the terminus of Victory Boulevard to Brooklyn, along 67th Street, then utilize the R train along Fourth Avenue." The plan's projected cost would be $3 billion, "the same as a proposed extension of the 7 line under the Hudson River". Supporters stated that a rail tunnel would improve quality of life for Staten Islanders, reduce traffic, and increase the attractiveness of the borough for investment.

== Similar proposals ==
=== Cross-Harbor Rail Tunnel ===
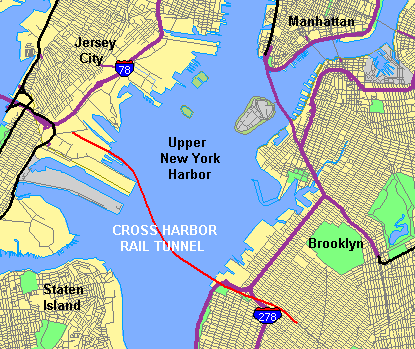
Map of the plans for the Cross-Harbor Rail Tunnel

The nearby Cross-Harbor Rail Tunnel is being planned to connect northeastern New Jersey and Long Island, with portals in Brooklyn and in Jersey City, New Jersey. The tunnel is being planned as a result of passenger and commuter traffic frequencies being at capacity and precluding freight movements. As early as the 1920s, this tunnel had been planned to cross the entire New York Harbor rather than just the Narrows. As a precursor to the planned project, which could cost up to $11 billion to build, the Port Authority of New York and New Jersey (PANYNJ) compiled a Tier 1 Draft Environmental Impact Statement (DEIS) in November 2014.

=== Tunnels from Brooklyn to New Jersey via Staten Island ===
The former Pennsylvania Railroad (PRR) also planned a railroad tunnel, for freight use, between Brooklyn and Staten Island in 1893. The PRR also proposed a tunnel from Brooklyn to Jersey City, approximately following the planned path of the Cross-Harbor Rail Tunnel, ten years later. The project was never started, despite efforts by government planners to start the project from the 1920s through the 1940s.

In January 1935, New York City Mayor Fiorello LaGuardia solicited the PANYNJ's help to create a report, called the "Summary of Cross Bays Freight Tunnel Study (Routes via Staten Island)," detailing four routes for a freight tunnel running to New Jersey via a tunnel to Staten Island. However, the only option that was deemed feasible was one that went from the end of the Bay Ridge Branch in Brooklyn to Greenville Yard in Greenville, New Jersey, which could either go through Staten Island or directly under the New York Bay. While the route via Staten Island, estimated at $35 million, could potentially accommodate a passenger line at a cost of another $28 million, other costs made the direct route cheaper.

In 1978, Parsons, Brinckerhoff, Quade and Douglas studied four options for a tunnel from Brooklyn to New Jersey, some involving a tunnel to Staten Island. These included an option for a tunnel directly from Greenville Yard to the Bay Ridge Branch, and a link from New Jersey to Manhattan. Also under consideration was a single-tube tunnel with accommodations for electric units only. The Greenville–Brooklyn tunnel would be about $331 million, which was cheaper than the approximately $405 million tunnel from Staten Island to Brooklyn.

=== Boulevard Subway plan ===
In 1912, Wood, Harmon & Co proposed a new subway from Bayonne, New Jersey, to Staten Island. This was called the Boulevard Subway. In their advertisements, the company stated, "Five or ten years from now—when the subway to Staten Island is built—… some Doubting Thomases of New Yorkers who don't buy will be shedding tears at their lack of foresight."

The plan resurfaced in 1929, when meetings took place between Jersey City Mayor Frank Hague and officials from New York City Mayor Jimmy Walker's office. This plan proposed a subway line running along the SIRT North Shore Branch and John F. Kennedy Boulevard in New Jersey, before connecting with the Hudson and Manhattan Railroad (today's PATH train) at Exchange Place. The service would have provided access to Lower Manhattan via the H&M's Downtown Hudson Tubes to Hudson Terminal (now the site of the World Trade Center station). There were also plans to extend the line to the George Washington Bridge in Fort Lee.

=== Vehicular tunnels under the Narrows ===
In 1929, after the cancellation of the plan to build a subway tunnel from Staten Island to Brooklyn, engineers proposed a set of vehicular tunnels from Fort Wadsworth, Staten Island, to 97th Street, Brooklyn. The tubes were being planned in conjunction with the Triborough Tunnel (the modern-day Queens Midtown Tunnel), which would connect Manhattan, Brooklyn, and Queens. The city appropriated $5 million for the tunnels in July 1929. Boring work for the vehicular tunnels started in November 1930, but in January 1932, construction was delayed indefinitely due to a lack of money. The construction work did not go beyond an examination of shoreline on the Brooklyn side.

In 1936, the plan for a vehicular tunnel under the Narrows was brought up again when Mayor La Guardia gained authorization to petition Congress for a bridge across the strait. LaGuardia preferred a tunnel instead, and so the next year he requested the New York City Tunnel Authority to review the feasibility of such a crossing. In 1943, the New York City Board of Estimate allocated $50,000 toward a feasibility study of the tubes. After World War II ended in 1945, the New York City Planning Commission estimated that construction of the Narrows Tunnel would cost $73.5 million. However, by then, La Guardia had turned against the tunnel, saying that "it is not my time" to construct the tunnel. This prompted Robert Moses to propose the Verrazzano-Narrows Bridge, which opened in 1964 and only carries road vehicles.

== See also ==
- Proposed expansion of the New York City Subway
- Rail freight transportation in New York City and Long Island
