= Bay Ridge–95th Street station =

New York City Subway station in Brooklyn

Bay Ridge–95 Street
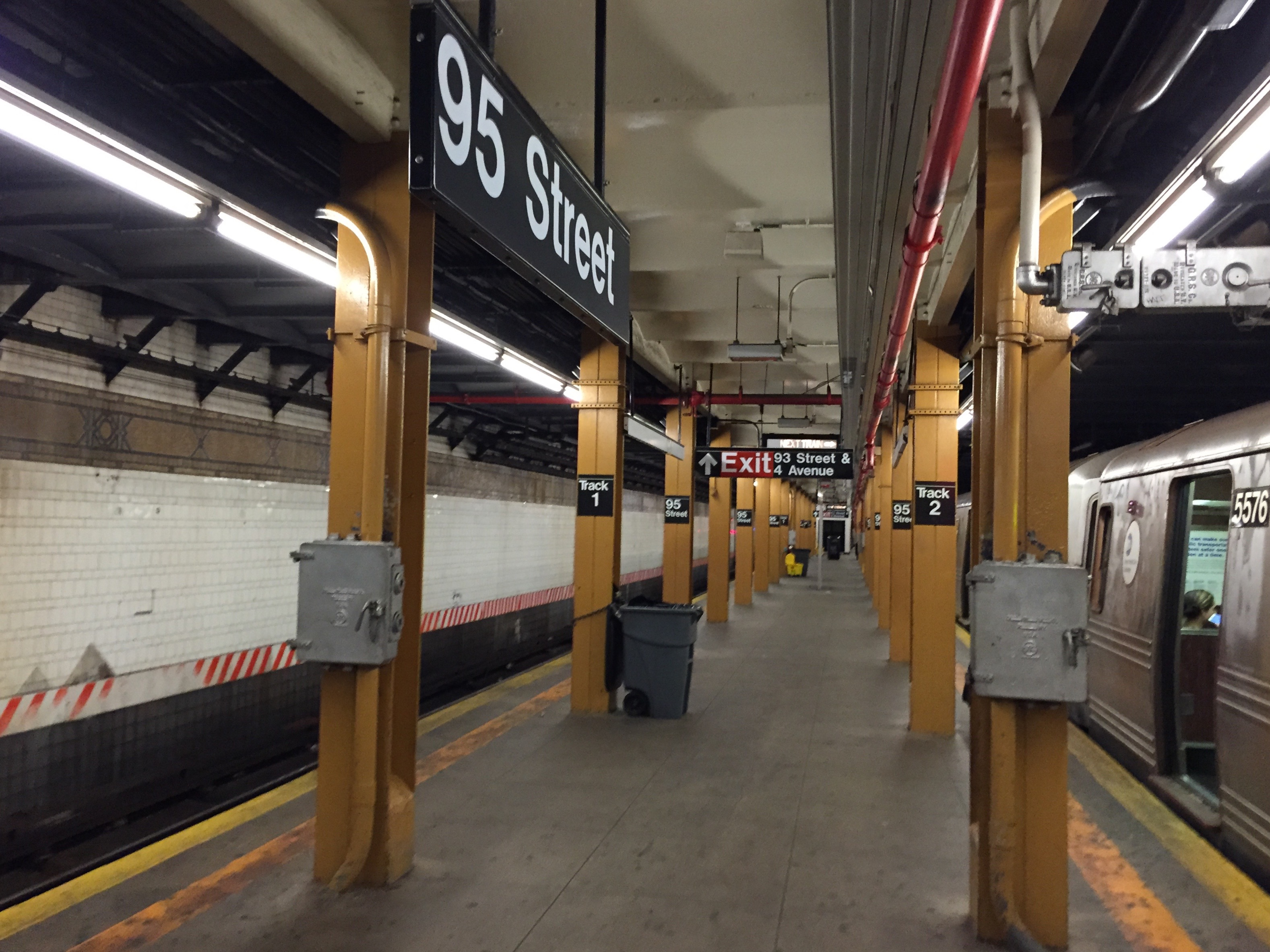
- Station platform

Station statistics
- Address: 95th Street & Fourth Avenue; Brooklyn, New York
- Borough: Brooklyn
- Locale: Fort Hamilton
- Coordinates: 40°36′58.2″N 74°1′52.4″W
- Division: B (BMT)
- Line: BMT Fourth Avenue Line
- Services: R (all times)
- Transit: NYCT Bus: B8, B16, B37, B63, X27, X37
- Structure: Underground
- Platforms: 1 island platform
- Tracks: 2

Other information
- Opened: October 31, 1925 (100 years ago)
- Accessible: Yes
- Former/other names: 95th Street–Fort Hamilton

Traffic
- 2025: 1,242,319 ▲3.5%
- Rank: 270 out of 423
Services
Preceding station	New York City Subway	Following station
86th Street toward Forest Hills–71st Avenue	R (New York City Subway service)	Terminus
Location
Location within New York City Subway
Location within New York City
Location within New York
Track layout
Street map
Station service legend
Symbol	Description
Stops all times	Stops all times

The Bay Ridge–95th Street station (originally 95th Street–Fort Hamilton) is the southern terminal station on the BMT Fourth Avenue Line of the New York City Subway. Despite the name, the station is located in the neighborhood of Fort Hamilton (as its original name implied) at the intersection of 95th Street and Fourth Avenue in southwestern Brooklyn. It is served by the R train at all times. Geographically, this station is the westernmost New York City Subway station.

The station was first planned in 1922 as the first part of an extension to Staten Island through a tunnel under the Narrows. Construction began on December 17, 1923, after the construction contractor submitted, withdrew, and resubmitted its bid. The station opened on October 31, 1925, but the Staten Island extension was never built due to various funding disputes. The platform was lengthened in the 1960s. A renovation making the station compliant with the Americans with Disabilities Act of 1990 took place from 2023 until mid-2025.

== History ==
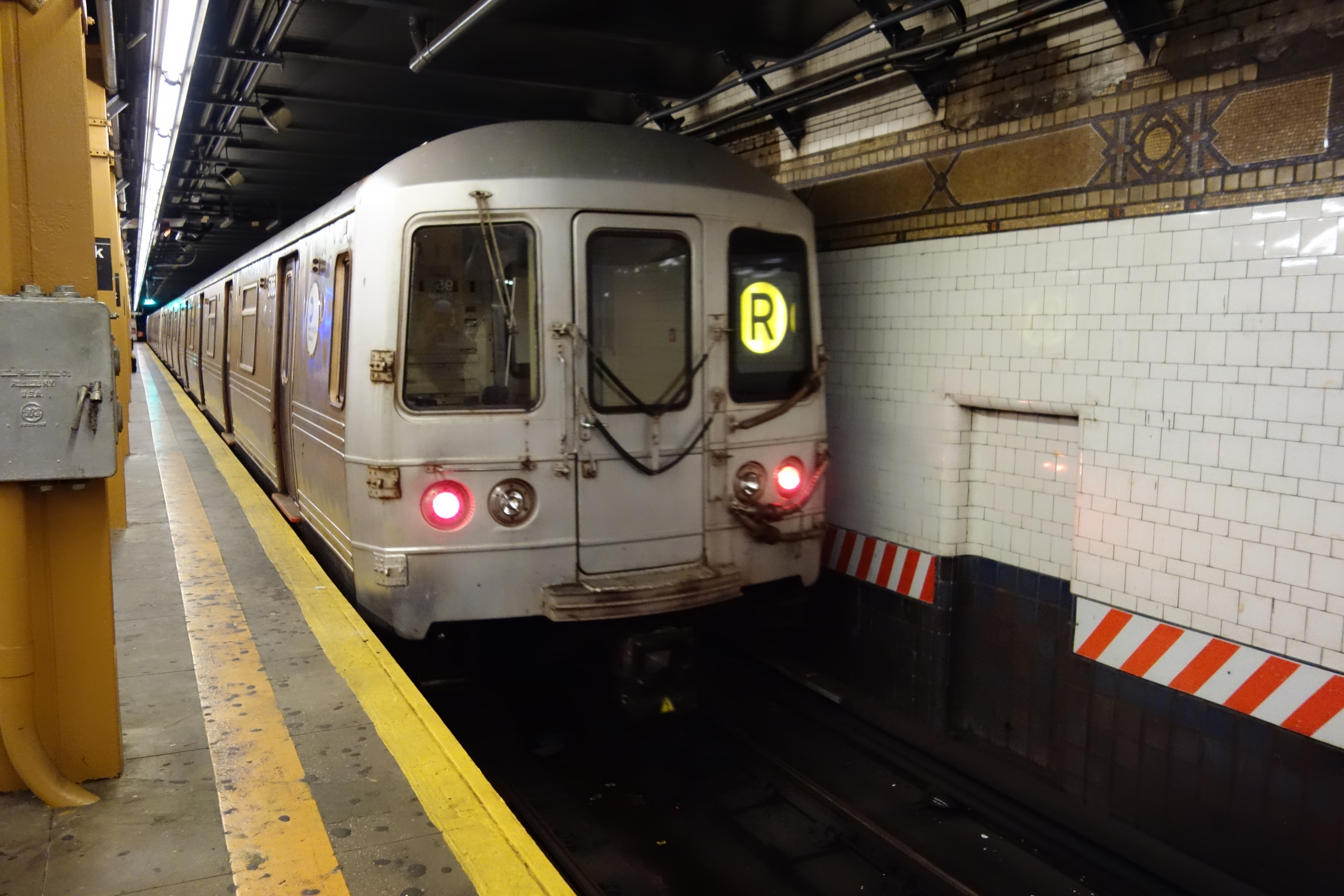
A Forest Hills-bound R train leaving the station

=== Construction and opening ===
On August 25, 1922, the Transit Commission directed its chief engineer, Robert Ridgway, to plan an extension of the Fourth Avenue Line from 87th Street to Fort Hamilton. Initially, multiple stations along the extension were considered. This extension was to be the first part of an extension to Staten Island through a tunnel under The Narrows. On September 12, 1922, a meeting was held by the Transit Commission to determine whether a stop at 91st Street should be included as part of the planned extension. Ultimately, no station was built at 91st Street. At the meeting it was decided that money for an additional station in between 86th Street and the new terminal at 95th Street would be better spent on an extensive terminal with entrances at 93rd, 94th, and 95th Streets. Other extensions were also planned in 1922: a branch of the line running via 86th Street to 18th Avenue to connect with the New Utrecht Line to Coney Island, Route 19, and the future subway under Tenth Avenue, as well as a branch of the line at 67th Street heading to Staten Island, Route 20.

On December 28, 1922, the Transit Commission announced that it had awarded the contract for the construction of a half-mile extension of the Fourth Avenue Line, Contract 11B, to T. A. Gillespie Company for $1.5 million (equivalent to $29 million in 2025). However, as the Board of Estimate failed to take action upon it, the contractor withdrew its bid on March 7, 1923. The Transit Commission blamed the Board of Estimate for delays in the awarding of the contract; the Commission said that the city would suffer a substantial loss due to increased construction costs, and because the contract that was given was "highly advantageous to the city." As part of Contract 11B, the extension was built with two tracks, with the exception of a short three-track stretch just north of the terminal at 95th Street. The extension was to be built with a provision to extend the line to Staten Island. As a result of a motion made by Commissioner LeRoy Harkness in front of the Transit Commission, the contract was set to be put back up for bid. On November 2, 1923, the Board of Estimate approved the contract for the line with T. A. Gillespie Company, the same contractor that had bid on the project earlier, but withdrew. The Transit Commission, due to the delay of the project, gave orders on November 3 to speed up the completion of the project. Construction began on December 17, 1923. The final extension to 95th Street, Route 18, opened on October 31, 1925, with the first train leaving at 2 p.m.

=== Platform extension and elevator installation ===
The city government took over the BMT's operations on June 1, 1940. In the 1960s, the New York City Transit Authority (NYCTA) started a project to lengthen station platforms on its lines in Southern Brooklyn from 530 feet (160 m) to 615 feet (187 m) to accommodate 10-car trains. On July 14, 1967, the NYCTA awarded a contract to conduct test borings at eleven stations on the Fourth Avenue Line, including 95th Street, to W. M. Walsh Corporation for $6,585 (equivalent to $63,583 in 2025) in preparation of the construction of platform extensions. The NYCTA issued an invitation for bids on the project to extend the platforms at stations along the Fourth Avenue Line between 45th Street and this station on May 3, 1968. However, work had already started on the platform extension project in February. The platform at 95th Street was extended by 85 feet (26 m) to the south.

As part of a plan to increase accessibility in the New York City Subway, during the early 1990s, the MTA proposed installing elevators at the Bay Ridge–95th Street station by 2010. The agency instead decided to make the 86th Street station accessible, as that station had transfers to more bus routes. In 2017, the MTA indicated that it was considering installing elevators at the 77th Street and 95th Street stations. Funding for elevators at the 95th Street station was included in the MTA's 2020–2024 Capital Program. In December 2022, the MTA announced that it would award a $146 million contract for the installation of eight elevators across four stations, including Bay Ridge–95th Street. The MTA began installing ADA upgrades to the station in 2023, including ramps to station entrances, two elevators, rebuilt staircases, and tactile platform edges. The project was completed in early July 2025.

== Station layout ==
This underground station has two tracks and one island platform. The R stops here at all times and is the route's southern terminus; the next station to the north is 86th Street. The tracks end at bumper blocks beyond the south end of the platform. North of this station is a diamond crossover. A center layup track forms just north of the diamond crossover, ending just south of the 86th Street station.

The platform has yellow painted I-beam columns and alternate ones have "95 Street" signs on them. Both platform walls have their original mosaic trim line with name tablets reading "95TH STREET" along the entire station except for a small section at the north end, where the platform was extended in 1970. Here, the wall is bare black. The station was constructed with a signal tower and dispatcher's office.

=== Exits ===
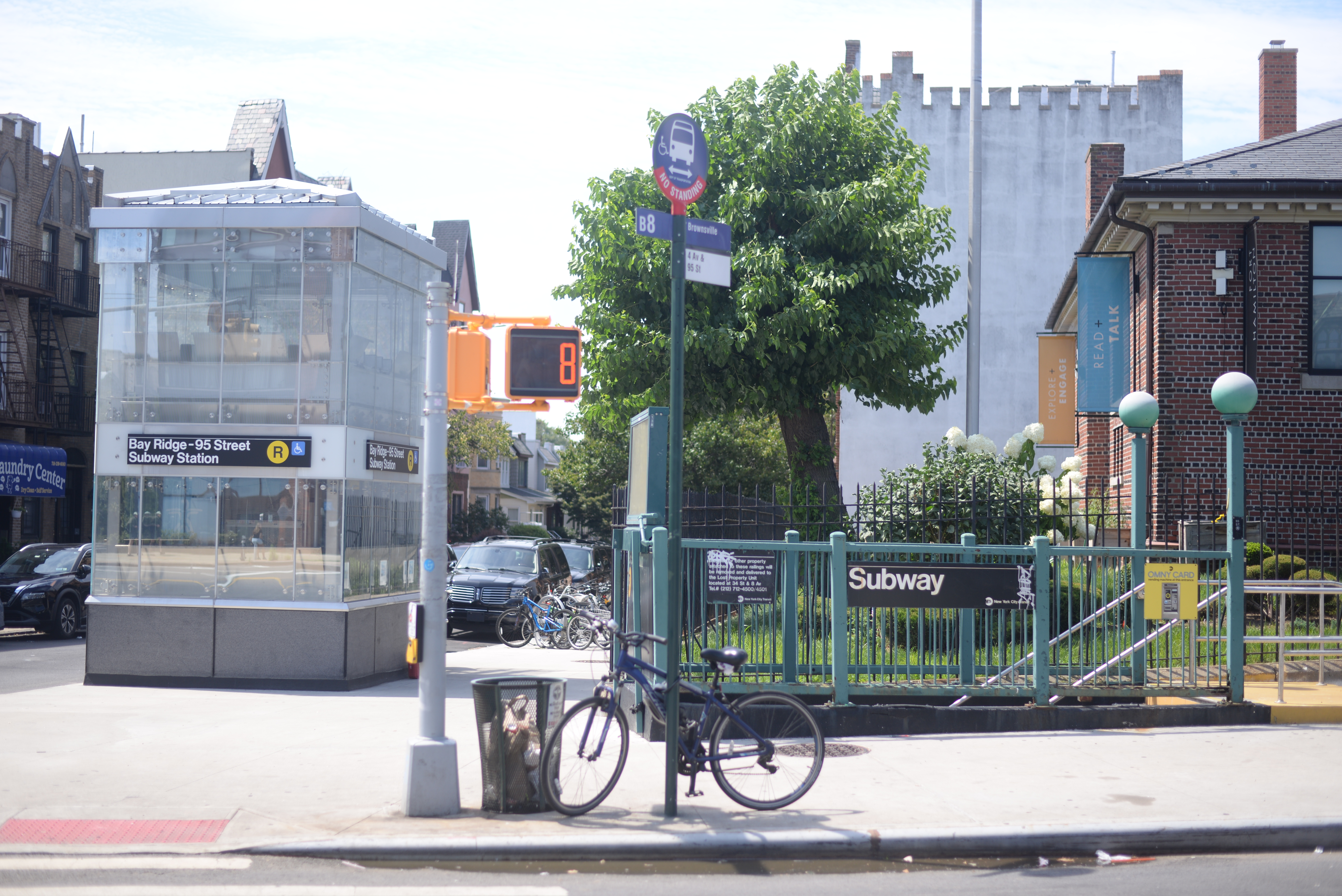
The station and elevator adjacent to the Fort Hamilton branch of the Brooklyn Public Library.

The station has two mezzanines above the platform and tracks. Mosaic directional signs indicate they were originally one full-length mezzanine. The closed-off sections are now used for employee-only spaces. The station's larger, full-time mezzanine is at the south end. It has two staircases from the platform, a turnstile bank, a token booth, and two restrooms. In addition, two staircases going up to either western corners of Fourth Avenue and 95th Street. A passageway leads to another staircase on the east side of the intersection, built inside an alcove of 9425 Fifth Avenue. The station's other mezzanine is unstaffed, containing one staircase from the platform, high entry/exit turnstiles, and two staircases going up to either southern corners of 93rd Street and Fourth Avenue. Additional exits were planned at 94th Street, but were never built.

== Provisions for proposed extensions ==
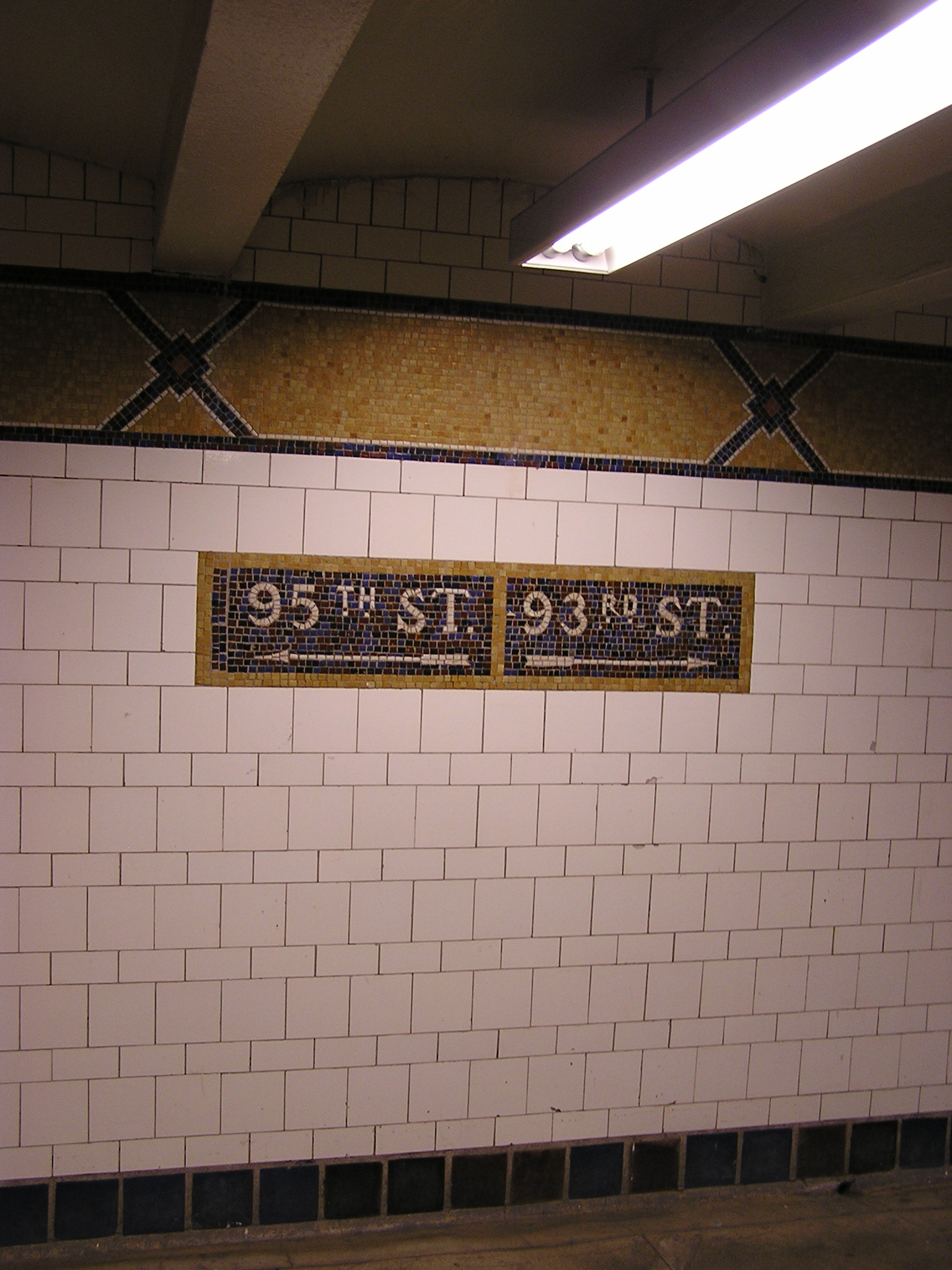
Mosaic directional signs at the unstaffed mezzanine

The station is built on the west side of Fourth Avenue due to plans for a possible extension of the express tracks south of 59th Street. This station had been built mainly to facilitate the Staten Island Tunnel or the "Narrows Tunnel", which would have necessitated express service, although the tunnel was never constructed.

South of this station, there is a false wall at the end of the tracks for a planned extension to 100th or 101st Street and into the never-built Staten Island "Narrows Tunnel", connecting the BMT line with the Staten Island Railway (SIRT) Main Line near its Grasmere station. The station would have also connected with the now-defunct South Beach Branch by disconnecting it from the SIRT main line, with the BMT Fourth Avenue Subway taking over service from the SIRT's Fort Wadsworth station to the Wentworth Avenue terminal. At the time it would have been a very different line had this tunnel been built, with through BMT service from Queensboro Plaza to Wentworth Avenue in Staten Island stopping at this station before proceeding to Staten Island, since this station is also the closest point to Staten Island. There were also plans to construct an underground storage yard here. The SIRT had been electrified in preparation for the tunnel, and had purchased subway cars similar to the AB Standards of the BMT.

The tunnel plan was amended in 1919, moving its location north to Shore Road in Bay Ridge. A groundbreaking ceremony was held by New York City Mayor John Hylan on April 14, 1923 in Bay Ridge and in Staten Island on July 19. In 1925, however—the year bids from contractors were to be entertained by the city—the project was halted and the project's engineering staff laid off. Officially, the plan was delayed due to lack of funding, but Hylan and New York City Board of Transportation (BOT) Chairman John Delaney also wanted to secure freight service for the tunnel. These disagreements caused deadlocks between the parties involved.

Later proposals surfaced to connect the station to the Verrazzano–Narrows Bridge, one of the world's longest suspension bridges, which follows the route of the planned tunnel. The bridge was completed in 1964 without provisions for rail traffic.
