= The Narrows =

Strait in New York City

Coordinates: 40°36′48″N 74°02′53″W

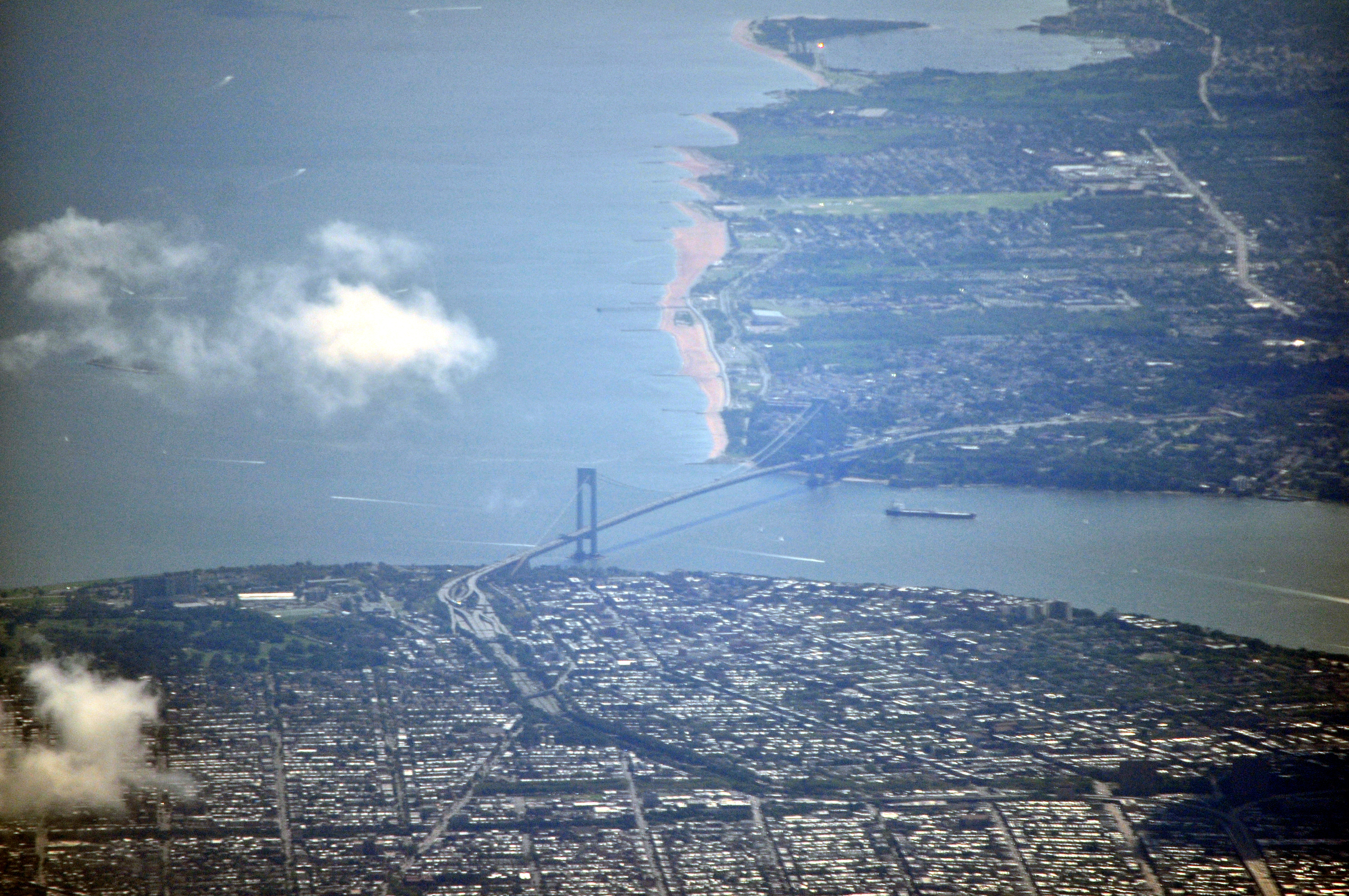
- Brooklyn (bottom) and Staten Island (upper right), connected by the Verrazzano–Narrows Bridge

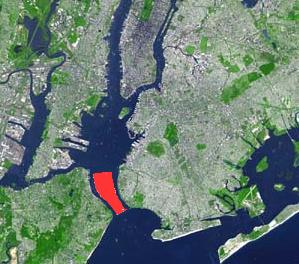
- A TERRA satellite image of New York Harbor with The Narrows (in red), connecting Upper New York Bay to Lower New York Bay

Location
- Country: United States
- State: New York
- Municipality: New York City

Physical characteristics
- Source: Upper New York Bay
- Mouth: Lower New York Bay

The Narrows is the tidal strait separating the boroughs of Staten Island and Brooklyn in New York City. It connects the Upper New York Bay and Lower New York Bay (of larger New York Bay) and forms the principal channel by which the Hudson River flowing south from upstate New York and the New England regions, empties into the Atlantic Ocean. It has long been considered to be the maritime gateway to New York City and the Northeastern United States on the East Coast of North America, and historically has been one of the most important entrances into the seaport harbors of the Port of New York and New Jersey. The Verrazzano–Narrows Bridge spans The Narrows, connecting the Bay Ridge neighborhood of Brooklyn with Staten Island.

== History ==
=== Pre-history ===
The Narrows was most likely formed after deposition of the Harbor Hill Moraine about 18,000 years prior to the end of the last prehistoric ice age. Previously, Staten Island and Long Island / (Brooklyn) were connected and the Hudson River emptied into the Atlantic Ocean through the Raritan River, taking then a more westerly course through parts of present-day northern New Jersey, along the eastern side of the Watchung Mountains ridge to the area around Bound Brook, New Jersey, and then on into the Atlantic via the Raritan Bay. A build-up of water in the Upper New York Bay allowed the river to eventually break through to form The Narrows less than 12,000 to 13,000 years ago as it exists today.

=== Post-European contact ===
The first recorded European entrance into The Narrows off the East Coast of North America, was in 1524 by the Italian Florentine explorer Giovanni da Verrazzano (1485–1528), who was in the employ of and sailing for the Kingdom of France and its monarch, King Francis I, who set anchor off-shore in the strait and was greeted by a group of Lenape natives, who paddled out to meet him onboard his new strange huge sailing vessel in the strait.

Two and a half centuries later, in July and August 1776, the British naval and land forces under commanding General William Howe (1729–1814), in their campaign to take New York City and destroy the colonial American patriots' year-old rebellion, had already landed on nearby undefended Staten Island the previous month of early July 1776, undertook an amphibious operation moving northeast across The Narrows and New York Bay and landed south of and near the village of Brooklyn on the South Shore at the western end of Long Island. There they soon routed General George Washington's dug-in defending Continental Army by a long sweeping end-run flank attack at the famous Battle of Long Island (a.k.a. the Battle of Brooklyn) of August 27, 1776, before they made their escape, evacuating at night by barge / rowboats across the East River back to Manhattan, during the decisive New York and New Jersey campaign of the American Revolutionary War (1775–1783).

The Staten Island Tunnel, carrying the New York City Subway system line under and across The Narrows, was partially built during the 1920s but was never completed. The subsequent prominent landmark of a suspension span Verrazzano–Narrows Bridge was completed across The Narrows four decades later in November 1964. Designated then as the longest suspension bridge in the world at the time, it is still the longest suspension bridge in the United States (by length of the main span).

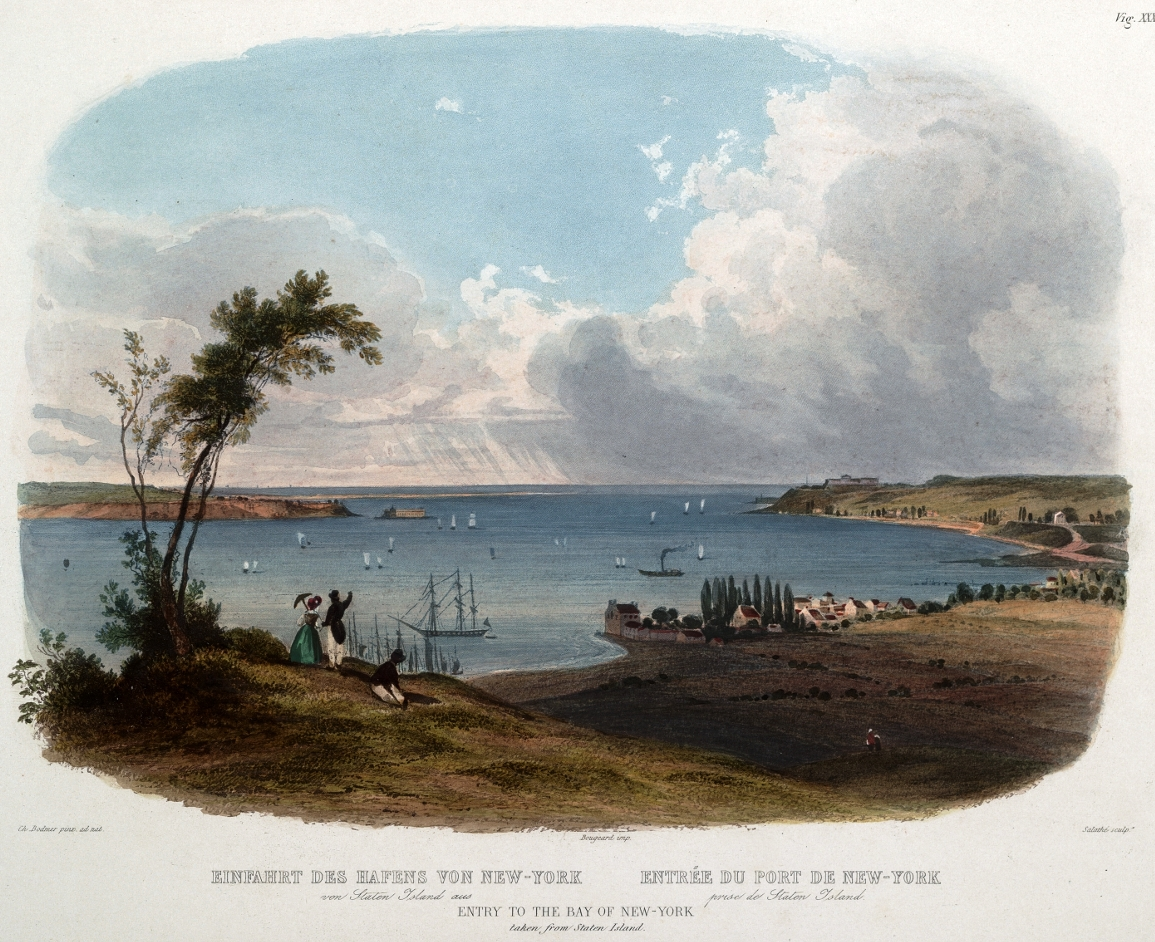
An 1832 published view of The Narrows and New York Bay by the Swiss/French artist Karl Bodmer (1809–1893), drawn during his American travels in the 1830s. Pictured with the early 19th century to mid-20th century military post of Fort Lafayette (1815–1960, originally named Fort Diamond) on Hendricks Reef, visible off the Brooklyn / Long Island eastern shore of the Narrows / Bay.

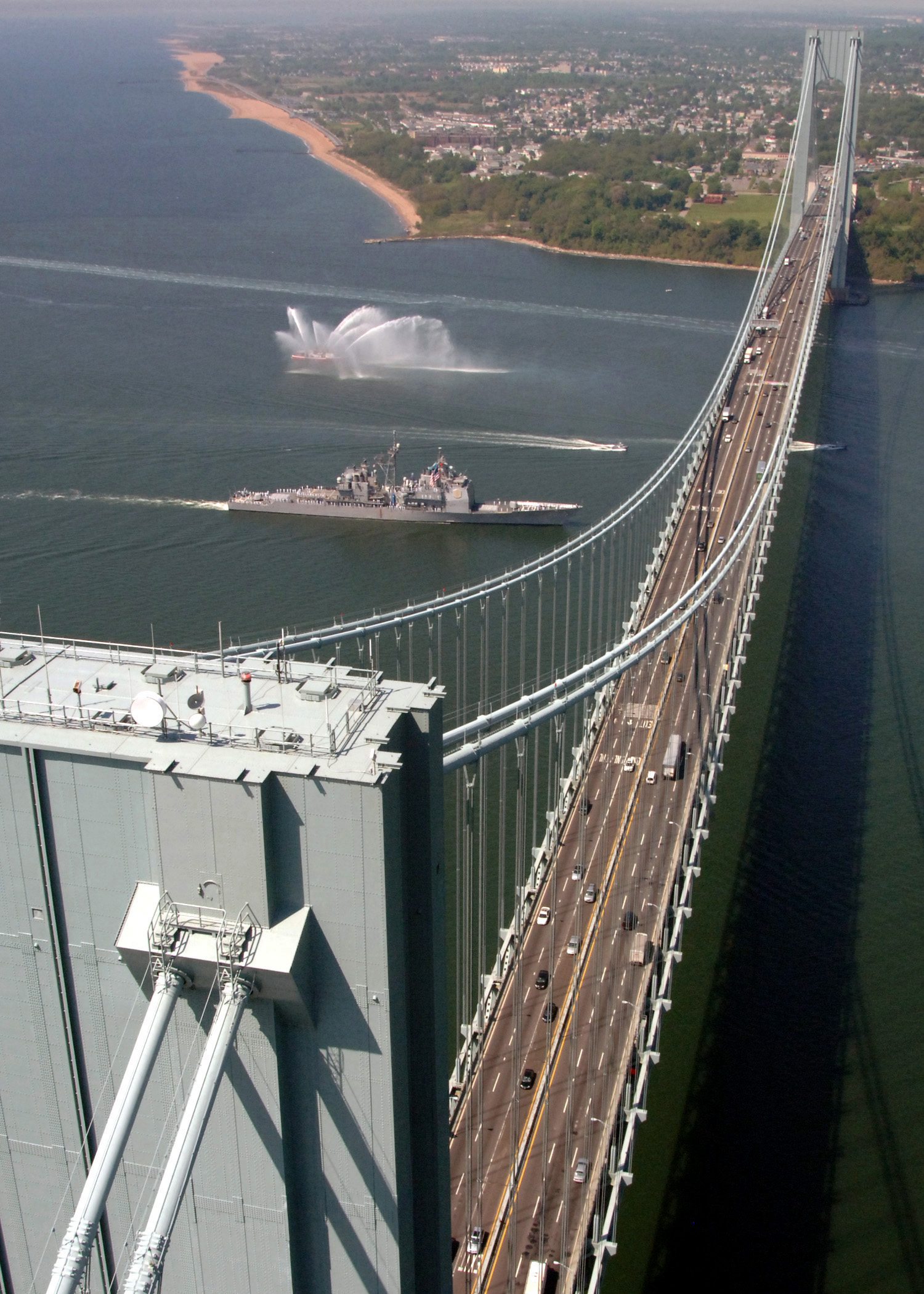
The Verrazzano–Narrows Bridge, shown with the United States Navy warship USS Leyte Gulf (CG-55) passing underneath it, spans The Narrows

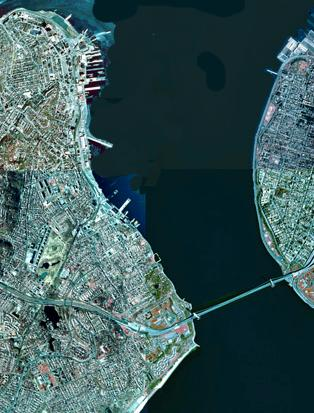
A satellite view of The Narrows with Staten Island (on the west / left) and Brooklyn / Long Island (on the east / right) connected by the prominent landmark Verrazzano–Narrows Bridge

== See also ==
- Geography of New York–New Jersey Harbor Estuary
- List of longest suspension bridge spans
- Staten Island Tunnel
