= 77th Street station (BMT Fourth Avenue Line) =

New York City Subway station in Brooklyn

77 Street
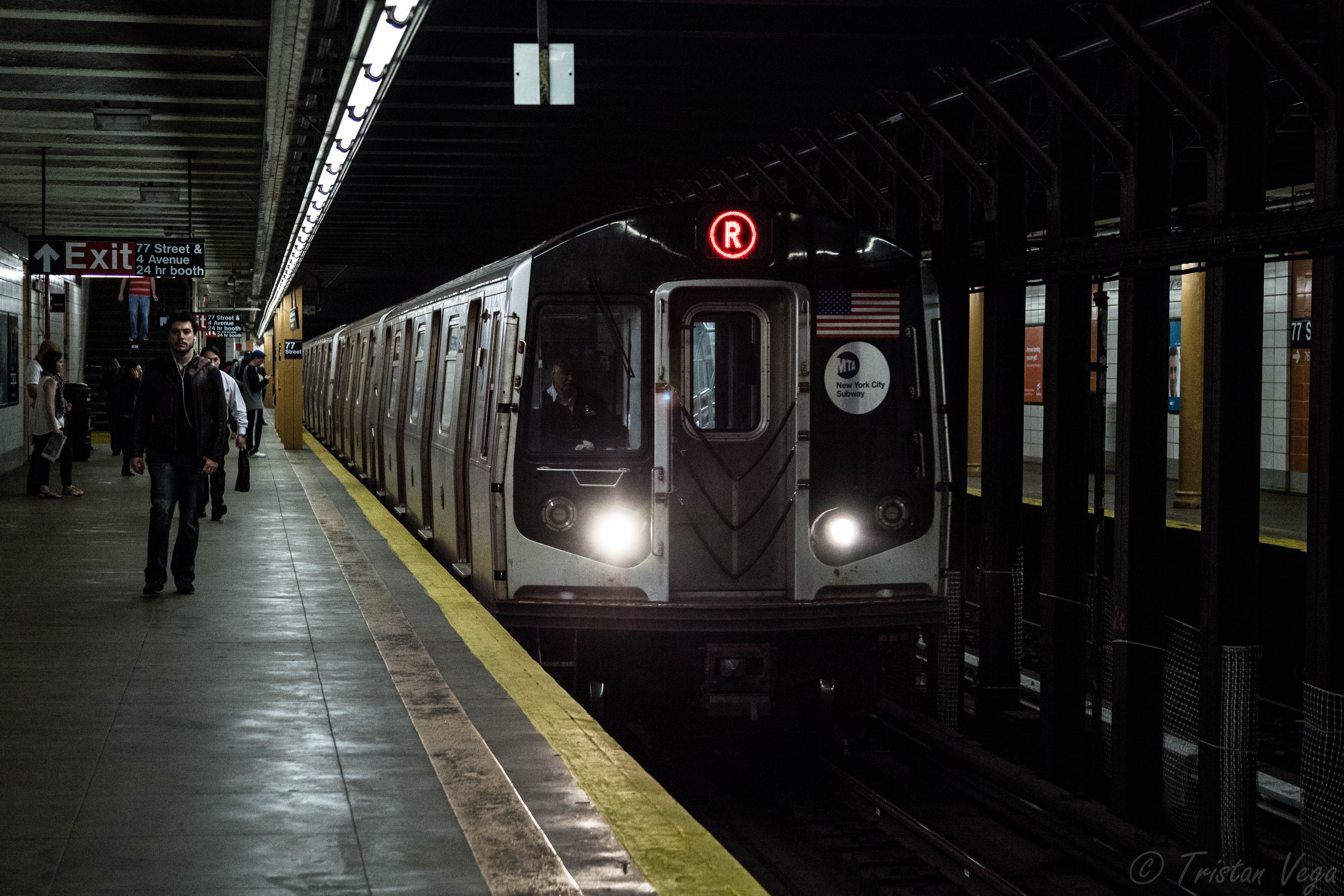
- Northbound R train arriving at the station

Station statistics
- Address: 77th Street & Fourth Avenue; Brooklyn, New York
- Borough: Brooklyn
- Locale: Bay Ridge
- Coordinates: 40°37′46″N 74°01′33″W
- Division: B (BMT)
- Line: BMT Fourth Avenue Line
- Services: R (all times)
- Transit: NYCT Bus: B4
- Structure: Underground
- Platforms: 2 side platforms
- Tracks: 2

Other information
- Opened: January 15, 1916 (110 years ago)
- Accessible: No; planned

Traffic
- 2025: 1,287,849 ▲5.5%
- Rank: 262 out of 423
Services
Preceding station	New York City Subway	Following station
Bay Ridge Avenue toward Forest Hills–71st Avenue	R (New York City Subway service)	86th Street toward Bay Ridge–95th Street
Location
Location within New York City Subway
Location within New York City
Location within New York
Track layout
Street map
Station service legend
Symbol	Description
Stops all times	Stops all times

The 77th Street station is a station on the BMT Fourth Avenue Line of the New York City Subway. Located at 77th Street and Fourth Avenue in Bay Ridge, Brooklyn, it is served by the R train at all times.

The 77th Street station was constructed as part of the Fourth Avenue Line, which was approved in 1905 and subsequently modified. Construction on the segment of the line that includes 77th Street started on January 24, 1913, and was completed in 1915. The station opened on January 15, 1916, as part of an extension of the BMT Fourth Avenue Line from 59th Street to 86th Street. The station's platforms were lengthened in 1926–1927 and in 1968–1970.

== History ==
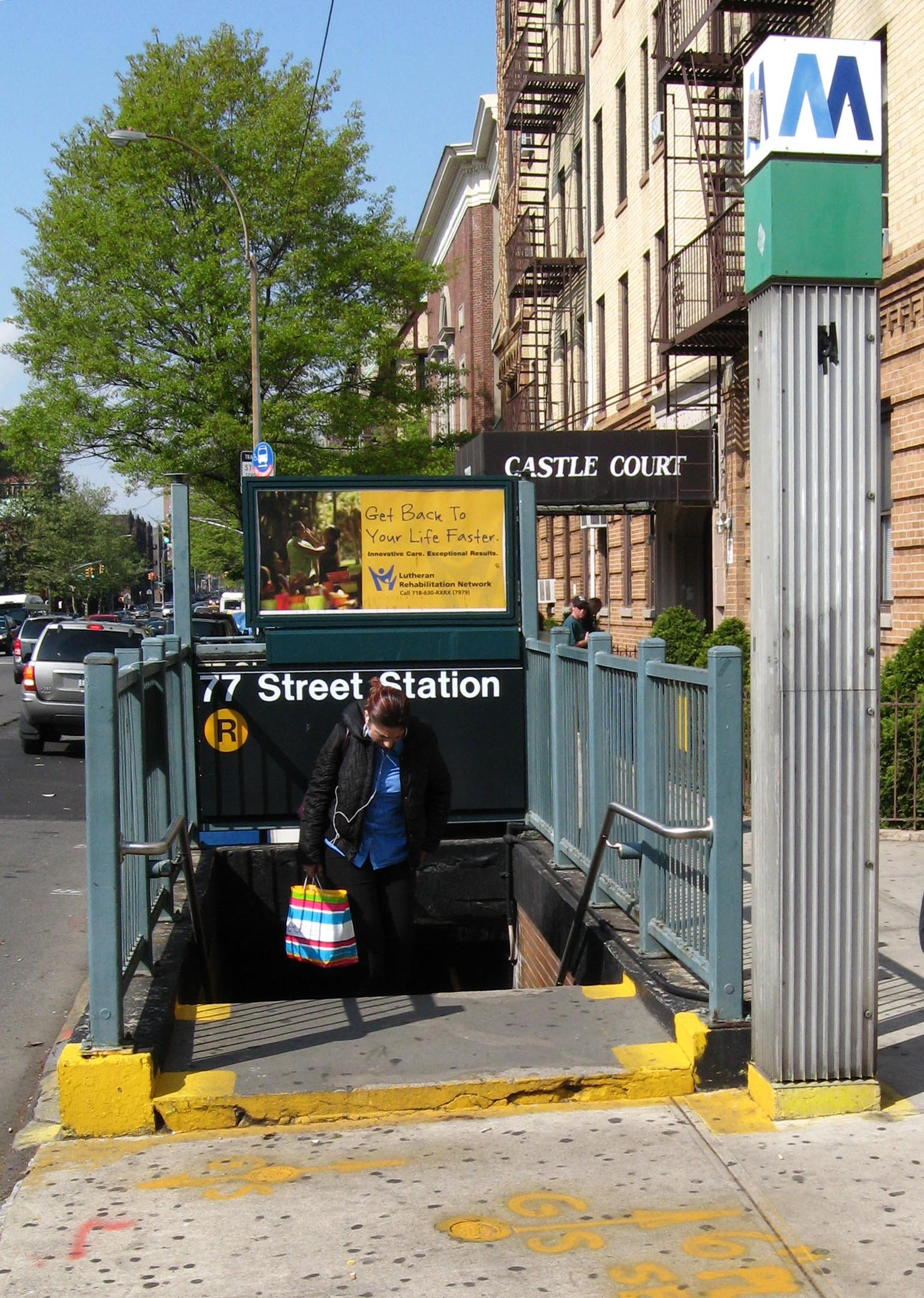
Stairs on east side of Fourth Avenue

=== Construction and opening ===
The 77th Street station was constructed as part of the Fourth Avenue Line. The plan for the line was initially adopted on June 1, 1905, before being approved by the Appellate Division of the Supreme Court of New York on June 18, 1906, after the Rapid Transit Commission was unable to get the necessary consents of property owners along the planned route. The Rapid Transit Commission was succeeded by the New York State Public Service Commission (PSC) on July 1, 1907, and the PSC approved the plan for the line in October and November 1907.

As part of negotiations between New York City and the Brooklyn Rapid Transit Company (BRT), and the Interborough Rapid Transit Company for the expansion of the city's transit network, the line was leased to a subsidiary of the BRT. The agreement, known as Contract 4 of the Dual Contracts, was signed on March 19, 1913. In 1912, during the Dual System negotiations, the construction of an extension of the Fourth Avenue subway from 43rd Street to 89th Street, just south of the 86th Street station, was recommended. This recommendation was approved by the Board of Estimate on February 15, 1912. The PSC directed its chief engineer to create plans on June 14, 1912. The two contracts for the extension, Route 11B, were awarded on September 16, 1912, to the Degnon Construction Company for a combined $3.8 million (equivalent to $126.8 million in 2025).

On January 24, 1913, construction began on Route 11B2, which includes this station and extends between 61st Street and 89th Street. Construction was completed on this section in 1915. 77th Street station opened on January 15, 1916, as part of an extension of the BMT Fourth Avenue Line from 59th Street to 86th Street.

=== Station renovations ===
==== 1920s ====
On June 27, 1922, the New York State Transit Commission commissioned its engineers to examine platform-lengthening plans for 23 stations on the lines of the Brooklyn–Manhattan Transit Corporation (BMT), the successor to the BRT, to accommodate eight-car trains. As part of the project, 77th Street's platforms would have been lengthened from 495 feet (151 m) to 530 feet (160 m). Progress on the extensions did not occur until February 16, 1925, when the New York City Board of Transportation (NYCBOT) commissioned its engineers to examine platform-lengthening plans for this and eleven other stations along the Fourth Avenue Line. It estimated the project would cost $633,000 (equivalent to $11,621,000 in 2025) (equivalent to $11,621,015 in 2025). The BMT had been ordered by the Transit Commission to lengthen these platforms since September 1923. The NYCBOT received bids for the project on February 25, 1926. The contract was awarded to the Corson Construction Company for $345,021 (equivalent to $6,275,000 in 2025) (equivalent to $6,274,583 in 2025). The extensions opened on August 1, 1927.

==== 1960s ====
The city government took over the BMT's operations on June 1, 1940. In the 1960s, the New York City Transit Authority (NYCTA) started a project to lengthen station platforms on its lines in Southern Brooklyn to 615 feet (187 m) to accommodate 10-car trains. On July 14, 1967, the NYCTA awarded a contract to conduct test borings at eleven stations on the Fourth Avenue Line, including 77th Street, to the W. M. Walsh Corporation for $6,585 (equivalent to $63,583 in 2025) in preparation of the construction of platform extensions (equivalent to $63,583 in 2025). The NYCTA issued an invitation for bids on the project to extend the platforms at stations along the Fourth Avenue Line between 45th Street station and Bay Ridge–95th Street, including this station, on May 3, 1968.

However, work had already started on the platform extension project in February. As part of the renovation project, the station's platforms were extended at its northern and southern ends, for a total of 85 feet (26 m), and the station's elaborate mosaic tile walls were covered over with 8-by-16-inch (20 by 41 cm) white cinderblock tiles. The latter change, which was also made to 15 other stations on the BMT Broadway and Fourth Avenue Line, was criticized for being dehumanizing. The NYCTA spokesman stated that the old tiles were in poor condition and that the change was made to improve the appearance of stations and provide uniformity. Furthermore, it did not consider the old mosaics to have "any great artistic merit".

In 2017, as part of an initiative to increase the accessibility of the New York City Subway system, the MTA indicated that it was considering installing elevators at the 77th Street and 95th Street stations.

== Station layout ==
This underground station has two tracks and two side platforms. The R stops here at all times. The station is between Bay Ridge Avenue to the north and 86th Street to the south.

While the 95th Street-bound platform has columns along its full length, the Manhattan-bound platform is mostly columnless, with only a few columns located in the middle of the platform and at either end. The columns on the 95th Street-bound platform are curved, except for those near the staircases to the mezzanine and at the north end of the platform, which are typical I-beams, and are where the platform was extended in 1970. All of the columns are painted yellow and alternate ones have "77 Street" signs on them.

Prior to the station's 1970 renovation, it was finished all in white and marble tile, and it had its own color scheme to allow regular passengers to identify the station based only on the color of the marble trimmings. Since that renovation, the station walls have consisted of white cinderblock tiles, except for small recesses in the walls, which contain orange-painted cinderblock tiles. These recesses contain the station-name signs as well as white text pointing to the exits.

=== Provisions ===
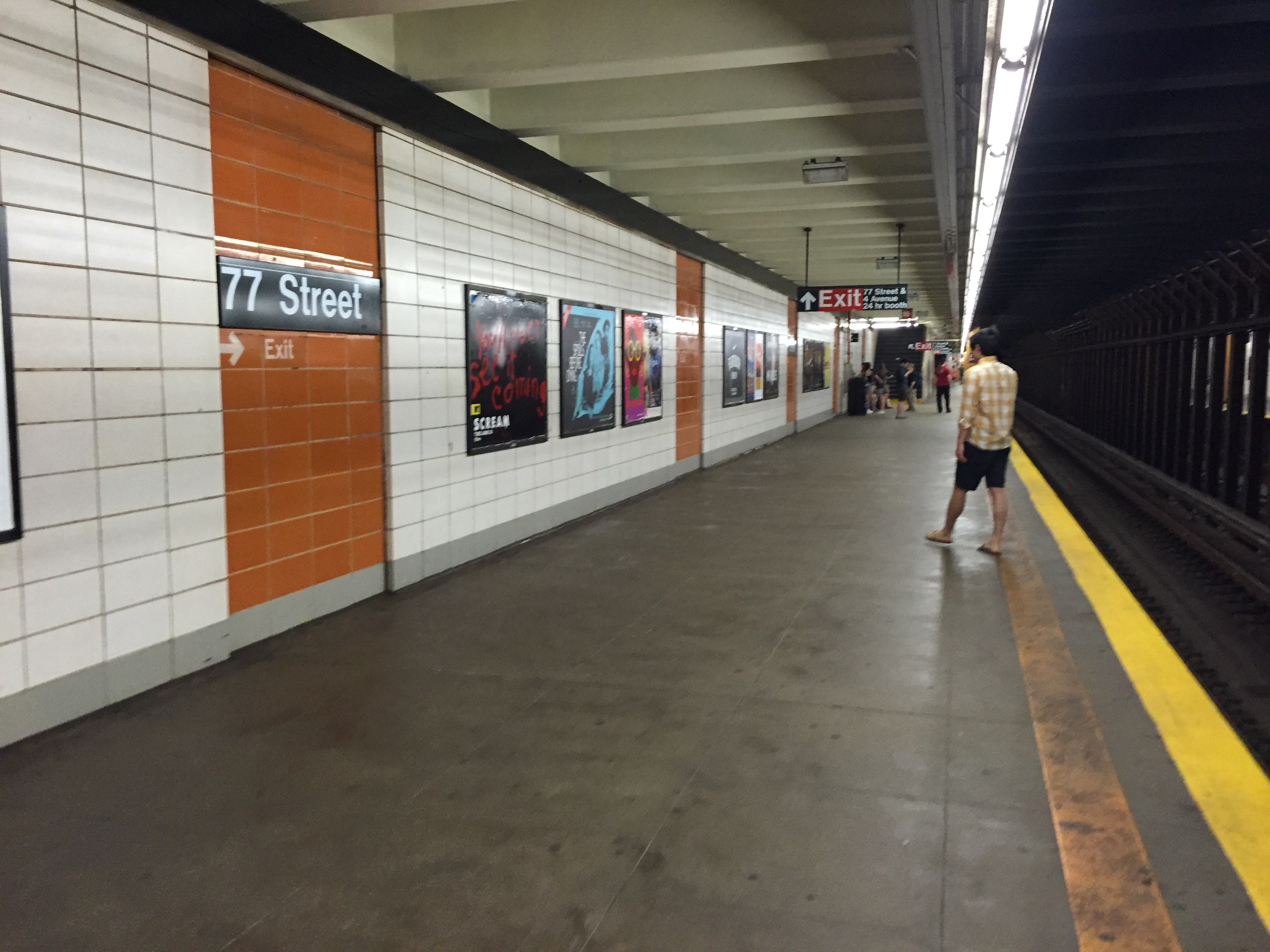
The northbound platform at the station is mostly columnless and is wider as a provision for an express trackway.

The Fourth Avenue Line south of 59th Street, including the Bay Ridge Avenue and 77th Street stations, was built as a two-track structure under the west side of Fourth Avenue with plans for two future tracks on the east side of the street. The station is designed to allow the northbound platform to become the Manhattan-bound express trackway if the two additional tracks were built. To facilitate the conversion, the northbound platform is mostly columnless and is wider than the southbound platform. Furthermore, there is space underneath the platform for the trackway.

=== Exits ===
The station's full-time entrance is a mezzanine at the south end above the platforms and tracks. Two staircases from each platform go up to a waiting area/crossover, where a turnstile bank provides entrance/exit from the system. Outside fare control, there is a token booth and two staircases going up to either northern corners of 77th Street and Fourth Avenue. The northwest staircase has its original ornate banisters and railings. Inside the mezzanine, there are mosaics indicating a newsstand and two restrooms, all of which are now closed, and directing to each platform.

In addition, the Bay Ridge-bound platform has an exit-only at the north end, which consisted of one high entry-exit turnstile on the platform. A single platform-level exit-only turnstiles leads to a double flight staircase that goes up to the northwest corner of 76th Street and Fourth Avenue. The landing here has the station's original trim line with "77" tablets on it.
