= 53rd Street station (BMT Fourth Avenue Line) =

New York City Subway station in Brooklyn

53 Street
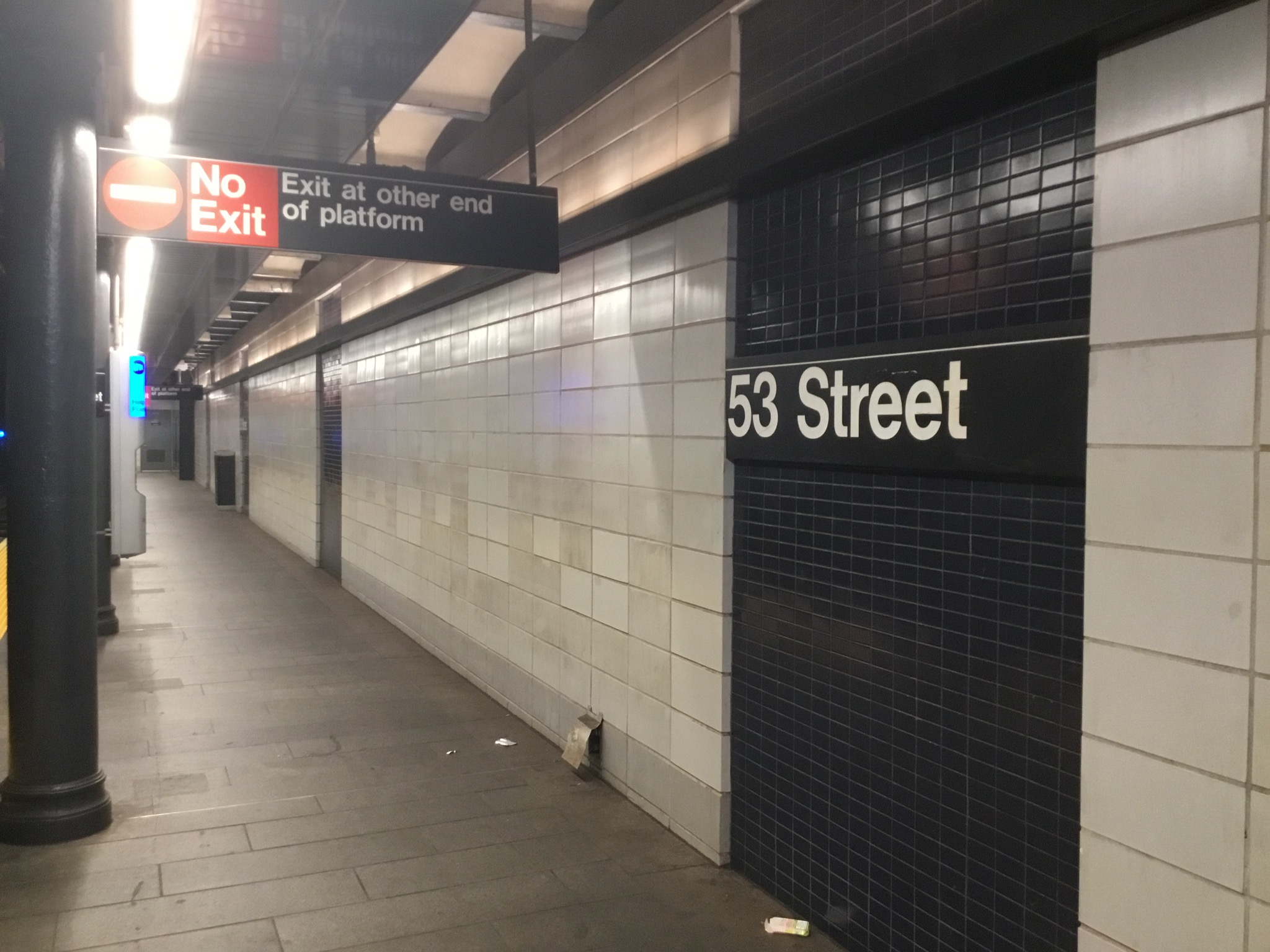
- View from the northbound platform

Station statistics
- Address: 53rd Street & Fourth Avenue; Brooklyn, New York
- Borough: Brooklyn
- Locale: Sunset Park
- Coordinates: 40°38′41″N 74°00′52″W
- Division: B (BMT)
- Line: BMT Fourth Avenue Line
- Services: N (late nights, and limited rush hour service in the reverse-peak direction); R (all times); W (limited rush hour service only)
- Transit: NYCT Bus: B11
- Structure: Underground
- Platforms: 2 side platforms
- Tracks: 4

Other information
- Opened: September 22, 1915 (111 years ago)
- Closed: March 27, 2017; 9 years ago (reconstruction)
- Rebuilt: September 8, 2017; 9 years ago
- Accessible: No; planned
- Other entrances/ exits: Fourth Avenue and 53rd Street, Fourth Avenue and 52nd Street (southbound only)

Traffic
- 2025: 2,189,557 ▲11.2%
- Rank: 168 out of 423
Services
Preceding station	New York City Subway	Following station
45th Street N R W toward Forest Hills–71st Avenue	Local	59th Street N R W toward Bay Ridge–95th Street
Location
Location within New York City Subway
Location within New York City
Location within New York
Track layout
Street map
Station service legend
Symbol	Description
Stops all times except late nights	Stops all times except late nights
Stops late nights only	Stops late nights only
Stops rush hours only	Stops rush hours only
Stops rush hours in the peak direction only	Stops rush hours in the peak direction only

The 53rd Street station is a local station on the BMT Fourth Avenue Line of the New York City Subway. Located at 53rd Street and Fourth Avenue in Sunset Park, Brooklyn, it is served by the R train at all times. The N train also stops here during late nights, and some rush-hour W trains stop here.

The 53rd Street station was constructed as part of the Fourth Avenue Line, which was approved in 1905. Construction on the segment of the line that includes 53rd Street started on March 15, 1913, and was completed in 1915. The station opened on September 22, 1915, after the opening of the initial portion of the BMT Fourth Avenue Line to 59th Street. The station's platforms were lengthened in 1926–1927, and again during a renovation in 1968–1970. The station was renovated again in 2017.

== History ==
=== Construction and opening ===
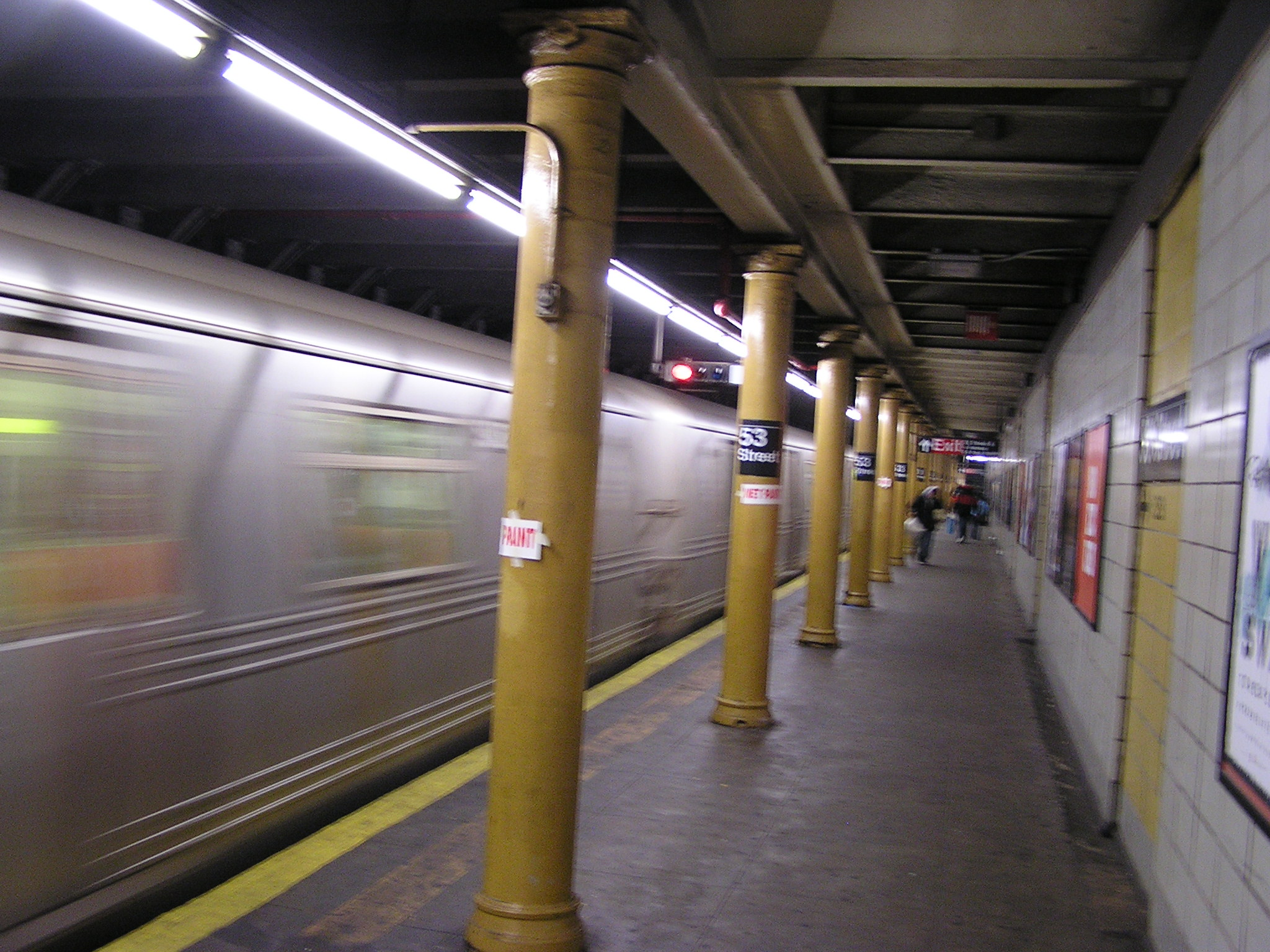
The station before renovation

The 53rd Street station was constructed as part of the Fourth Avenue Line, the plan for which was initially adopted on June 1, 1905. The Rapid Transit Commission was succeeded on July 1, 1907, by the New York State Public Service Commission (PSC), which approved the plan for the line in late 1907.

As part of negotiations between New York City, the Brooklyn Rapid Transit Company (BRT), and the Interborough Rapid Transit Company for the expansion of the city's transit network, the line was leased to a subsidiary of the BRT. The agreement, known as Contract 4 of the Dual Contracts, was signed on March 19, 1913. In 1912, during the Dual System negotiations, the construction of an extension of the Fourth Avenue subway from 43rd Street to 89th Street, just south of the 86th Street station, was recommended. The proposal was approved by the Board of Estimate on February 15, 1912. The PSC directed its chief engineer to create plans on June 14, 1912. The two contracts for the extension, Route 11B, were awarded on September 16, 1912, to Degnon Construction Company for a combined $3.8 million (equivalent to $126.8 million in 2025).

Construction on Route 11B1, the section of the extension between 43rd Street and 61st Street, which includes the 53rd Street station, began on March 15, 1913. Originally, this section was planned to have two tracks, but after the connection to the Sea Beach Line was added to the plan during the middle of construction, the plan was changed to four tracks. This section was completed in 1915. The section of the line running through the 53rd Street station opened on June 22, 1915, as part of an extension of the subway to Coney Island, which included the Fourth Avenue Line north of 59th Street as well as the entire Sea Beach Line. The line's opening was marked with a competition between two trains heading from Chambers Street station in Manhattan to the Coney Island station, one heading via the West End Line and the other via the Sea Beach Line; the latter got to Coney Island first. However, the 45th and 53rd Street stations remained closed, despite being technically complete, since the stations were being used by a contractor to haul dirt out. The stations opened on September 22, 1915.

=== Station renovations ===
==== 1920s ====
On June 27, 1922, the New York State Transit Commission commissioned its engineers to examine platform-lengthening plans for 23 stations on the lines of the Brooklyn–Manhattan Transit Corporation (BMT), the successor to the BRT, to accommodate eight-car trains. As part of the project, 53rd Street's platforms would have been lengthened from 495 feet (151 m) to 530 feet (160 m). Though the Transit Commission ordered the BMT to lengthen these platforms in September 1923, progress on the extensions did not occur until February 16, 1925, when the New York City Board of Transportation (NYCBOT) commissioned its engineers to examine platform-lengthening plans for this and eleven other stations along the Fourth Avenue Line. It estimated the project would cost $633,000 (equivalent to $11,621,000 in 2025) (equivalent to $11,621,000 in 2025). The NYCBOT received bids for the project on February 25, 1926. The contract was awarded to the Corson Construction Company for $345,021 (equivalent to $6,275,000 in 2025) (equivalent to $6,275,000 in 2025). The extensions opened on August 1, 1927.

==== 1960s ====
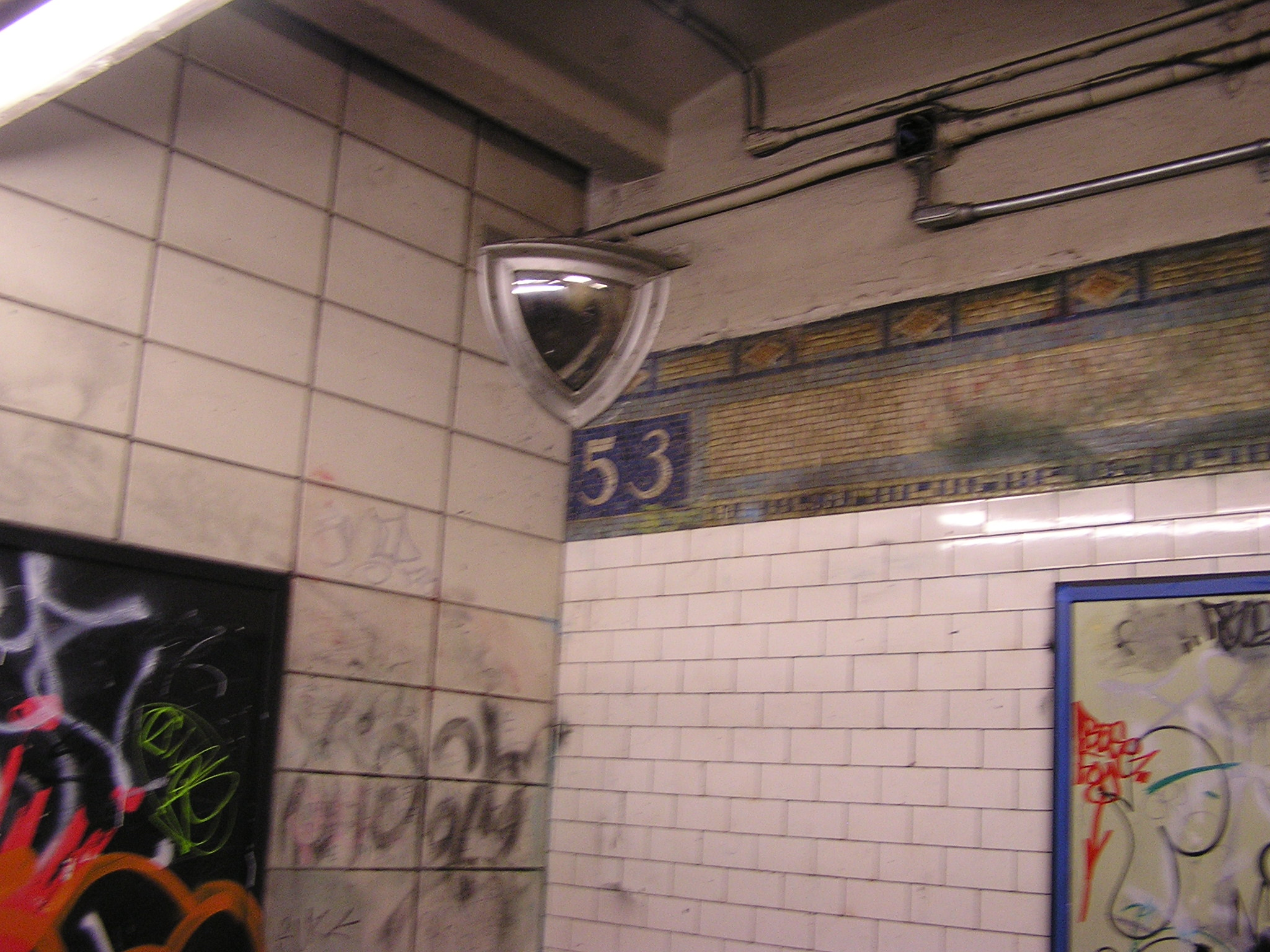
A former station name mosaic

The city government took over the BMT's operations on June 1, 1940. In the 1960s, the New York City Transit Authority (NYCTA) started a project to lengthen station platforms on its lines in Southern Brooklyn to 615 feet (187 m) to accommodate 10-car trains. On July 14, 1967, the NYCTA awarded a contract to conduct test borings at eleven stations on the Fourth Avenue Line, including 53rd Street, to the W. M. Walsh Corporation for $6,585 (equivalent to $63,583 in 2025) in preparation of the construction of platform extensions (equivalent to $64,000 in 2025). The NYCTA issued an invitation for bids on the project to extend the platforms at stations along the Fourth Avenue Line between 45th Street station and Bay Ridge—95th Street, including this station, on May 3, 1968.

As part of the renovation project, the station's platforms were extended 85 feet (26 m) to the south, and the station's elaborate mosaic tile walls were covered over with 8-by-16-inch (20 by 41 cm) white cinderblock tiles. The latter change, which was also made to fifteen other stations on the BMT Broadway and Fourth Avenue Line, was criticized for being dehumanizing. The NYCTA spokesman stated that the old tiles were in poor condition and that the change was made to improve the appearance of stations and provide uniformity. Furthermore, it did not consider the old mosaics to have "any great artistic merit".

==== 2017 ====
As part of the Metropolitan Transportation Authority's 2015–2019 Capital Program, the station, along with thirty other New York City Subway stations, were scheduled to undergo a complete overhaul as part of the Enhanced Station Initiative. Updates were to include cellular service, Wi-Fi, USB charging stations, interactive service advisories and maps, improved signage, and improved station lighting. From January to May 2016, Grimshaw Architects worked on a design for the station's renovation, with Arup Group acting as a consultant. The award for Package 1 of the renovations, which covered renovations at the Prospect Avenue, 53rd Street, and Bay Ridge Avenue stations on the BMT Fourth Avenue Line, was awarded on November 30, 2016. Citnalta-Forte Joint Venture was selected to renovate the three stations under a $72 million design–build contract, the first such contract in the subway system's history. The station was closed on March 27, 2017, for these renovations, and reopened on September 8, 2017, ahead of schedule.

In July 2025, the MTA announced that it would install elevators at 12 stations, including the 53rd Street station, as part of its 2025–2029 capital program. The elevators would make the station fully compliant with the Americans with Disabilities Act of 1990.

== Station layout ==
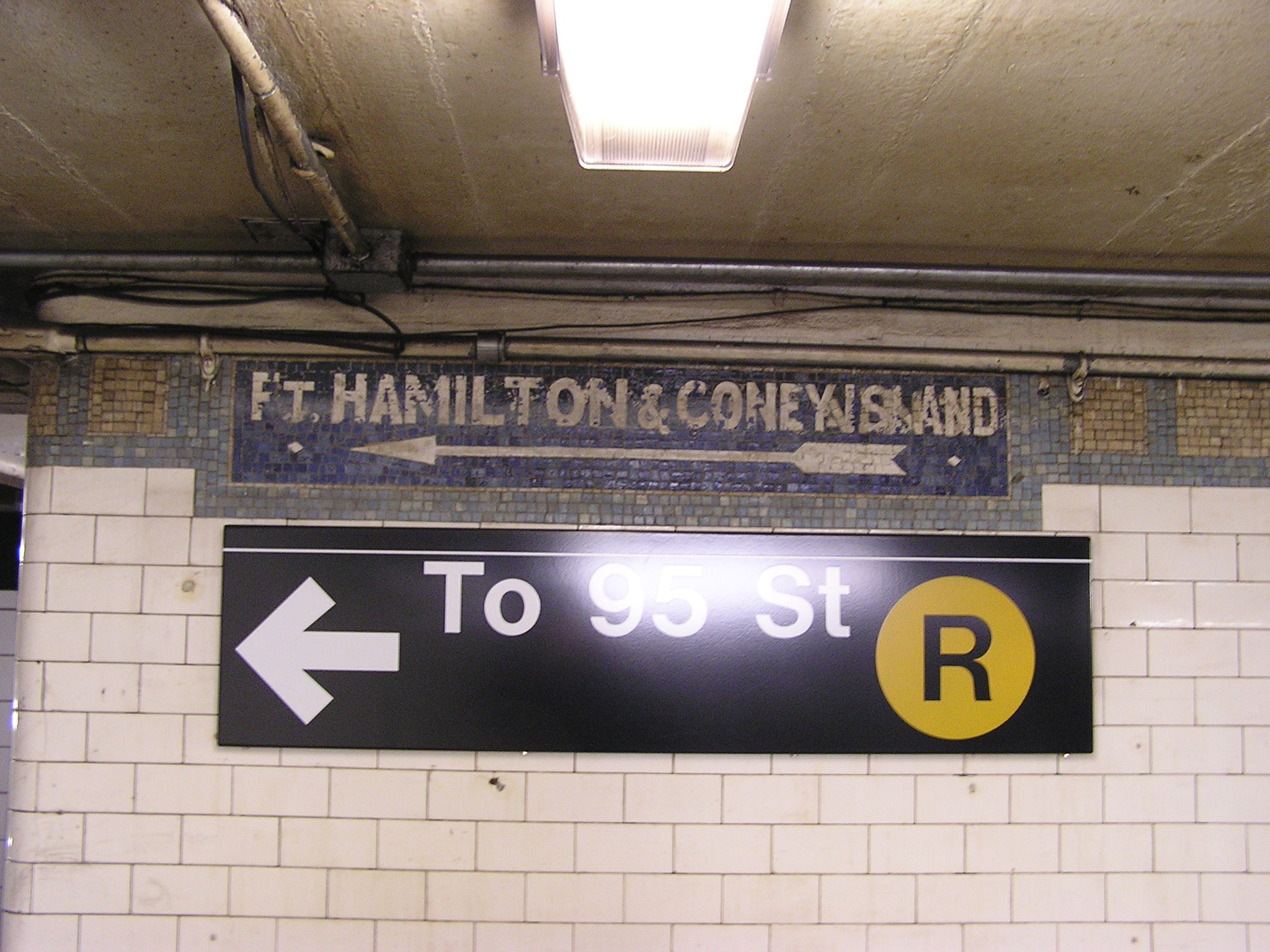
An original mosaic, directing passengers toward the 95th Street-bound platform, is located above modern signage.

This underground station has four tracks and two side platforms. The R stops here at all times; some rush-hour W trains stop here in the peak direction; and the N stops here during late nights, but uses the center express tracks to bypass the station during daytime hours. The station is between 45th Street to the north and 59th Street to the south.

Columns run along the entire length of both platforms and are painted black. Every other column has a "53 Street" sign on it in black with white text. All are rounded except for the ones near the two staircases to the station's main entrance, which was where the platforms were extended in 1970.

Prior to the station's 1970 renovation, it was finished all in white and marble tile, and it had its own color scheme to allow regular passengers to identify the station based only on the color of the marble trimmings. Since that renovation, the station walls have consisted of white cinderblock tiles, except for small recesses in the walls, which contain yellow-painted cinderblock tiles. The yellow cinderblock field contains the station-name signs and black text pointing to the exits. During the 2017 renovation, the cinderblock tiles were refurbished and colored white with small recesses containing black tiles. ADA-compliant platform treads and a granite tiled floor, as well as indirect lighting atop the station wall, which was relocated from above the platform edge, were installed.

The 2017 artwork at this station consists of nature-inspired mosaics by Brooklyn-based artist Mickalene Thomas.

=== Exits ===
The station's main entrance has two staircases to each platform and one to each northern corner of Fourth Avenue and 53rd Street. The mezzanine allows transfer between directions and contains some original mosaic directional and arrow signs. The one by the staircases to the southbound platform displays "Ft. Hamilton & Coney Island" while the one by the Manhattan-bound platform staircases displays "Down Town Trains."

The southbound platform has an additional entrance near the north end. Two platform-level turnstiles lead to a small landing before a three-flight staircase goes up to 52nd Street and Fourth Avenue. Prior to the 2017 renovation, the entrance was exit-only. The landing area contained the original 1915 trim band with a single "53" tiled on it prior to the renovation of the station.

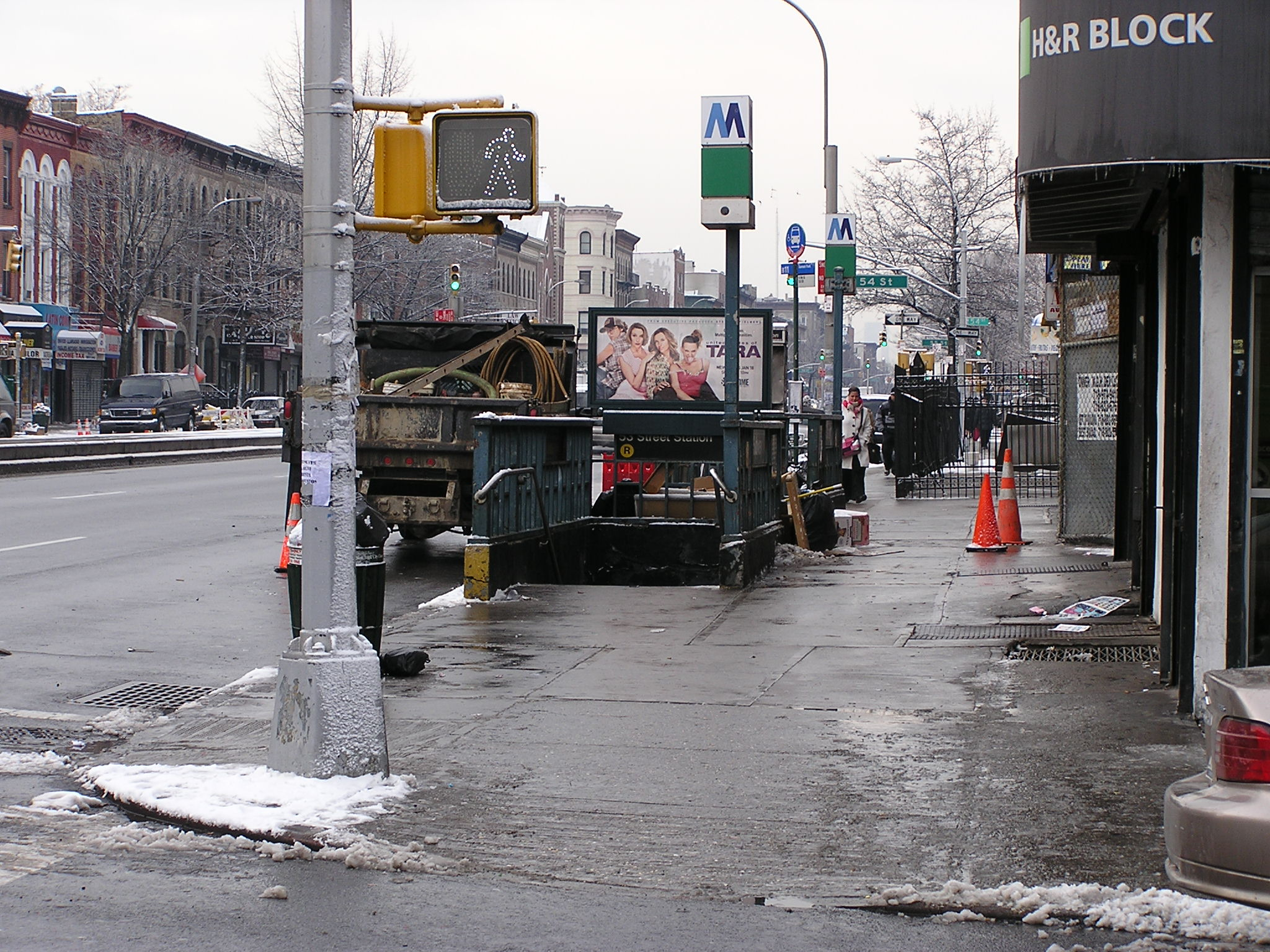
The entrance at 4th Avenue and 53rd Street before renovation, seen during a snowy day. This entrance is located next to a bus stop.

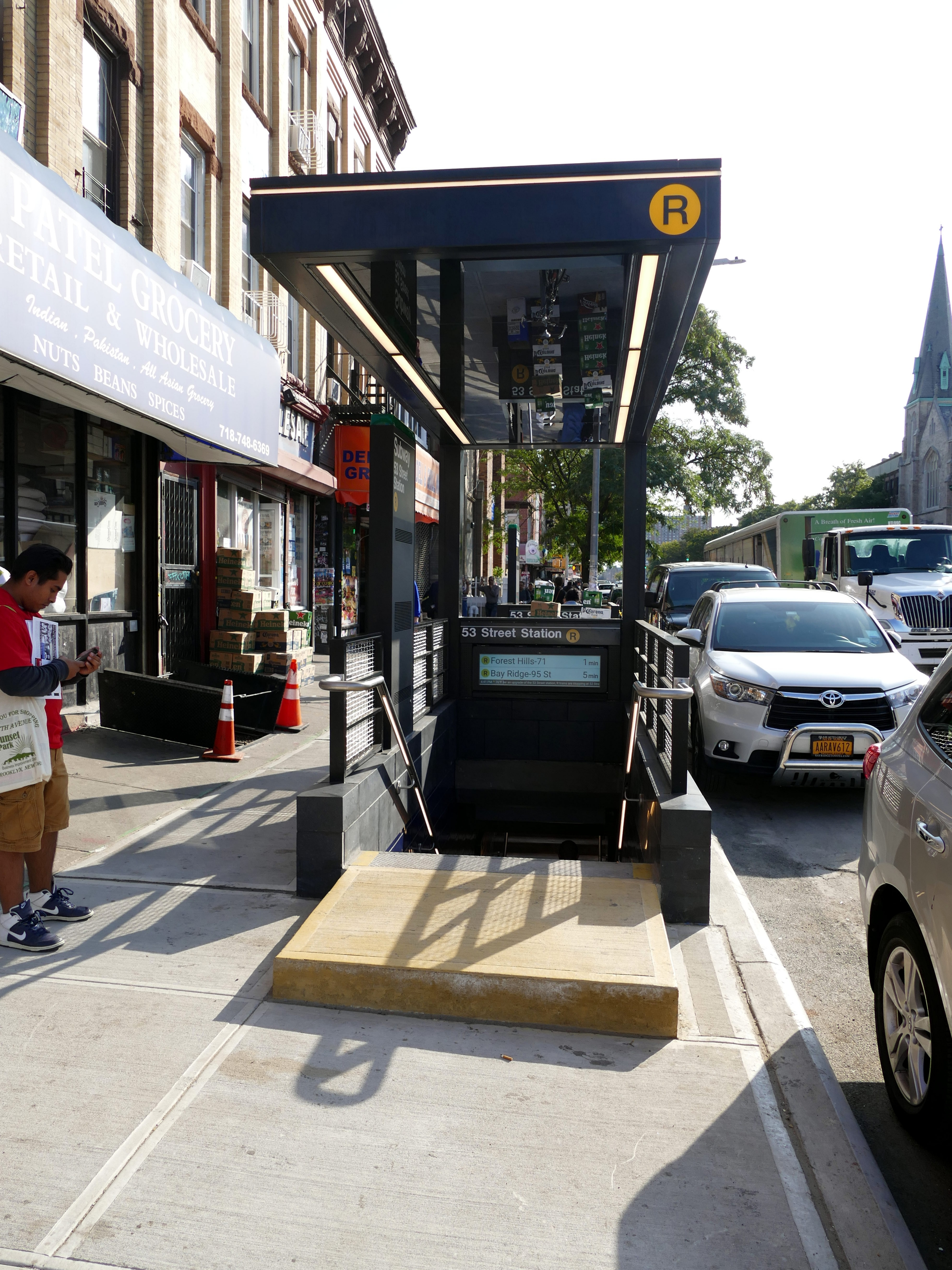
Modernized station entrance

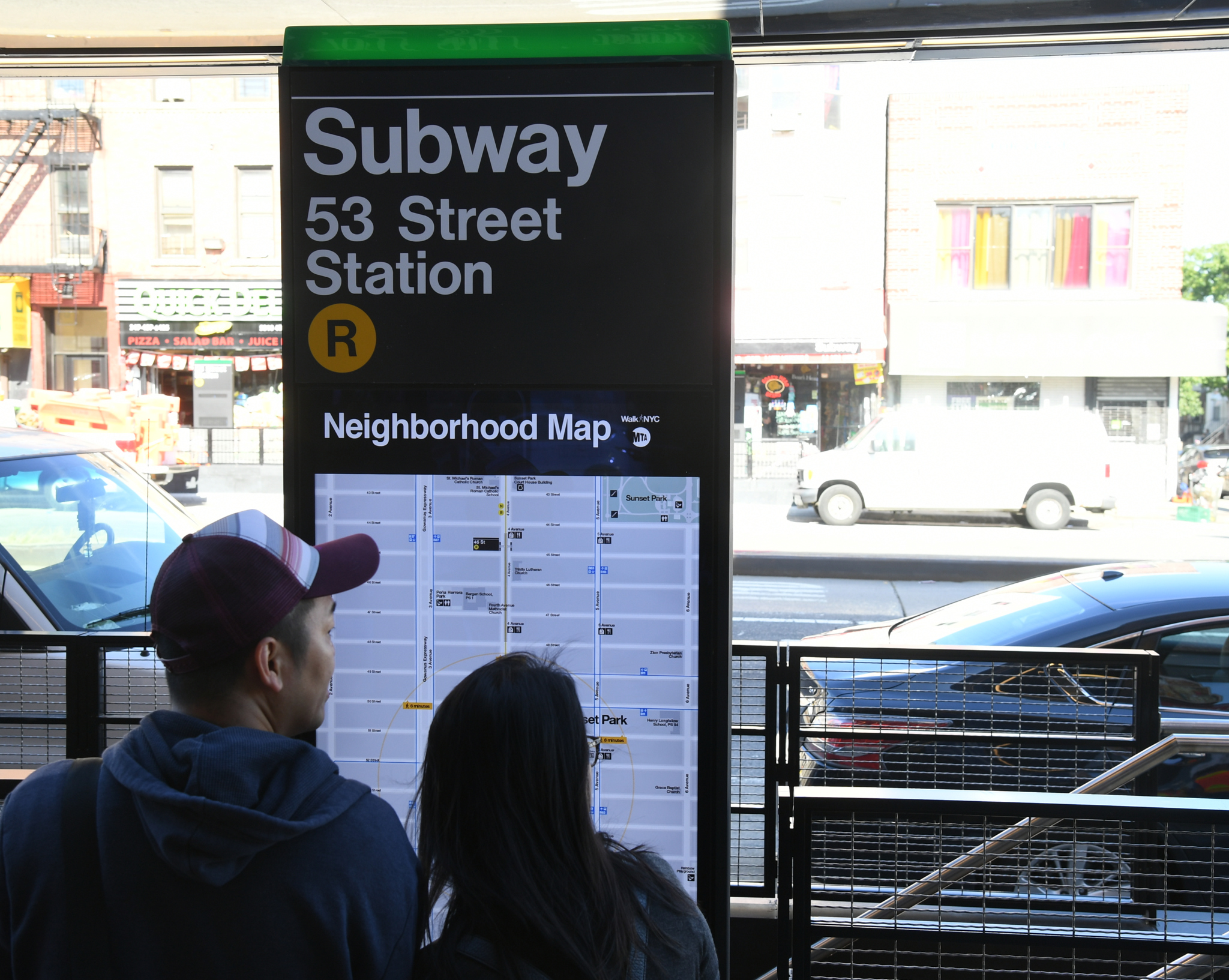
Interactive neighborhood map at entrance, added during renovation
