= Prospect Avenue station (BMT Fourth Avenue Line) =

New York City Subway station in Brooklyn

Prospect Avenue
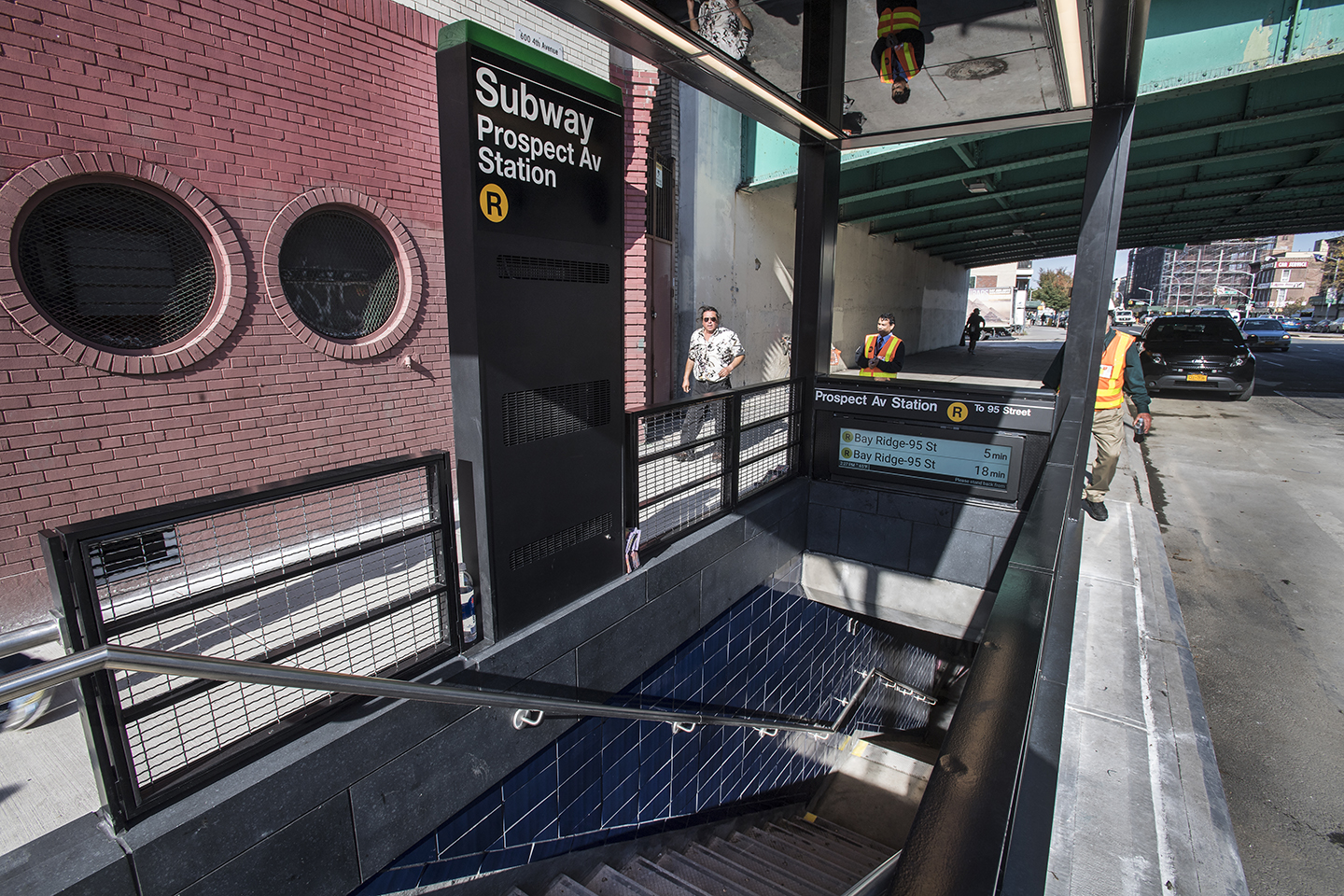
- Entrance to the southbound platform

Station statistics
- Address: Prospect Avenue & Fourth Avenue; Brooklyn, New York
- Borough: Brooklyn
- Locale: Gowanus, Greenwood Heights, Park Slope, South Park Slope
- Coordinates: 40°39′55″N 73°59′35″W
- Division: B (BMT)
- Line: BMT Fourth Avenue Line
- Services: D (late nights); N (late nights, and limited rush hour service in the reverse-peak direction); R (all times); W (limited rush hour service only)
- Structure: Underground
- Platforms: 2 side platforms
- Tracks: 4

Other information
- Opened: June 22, 1915; 111 years ago
- Closed: June 5, 2017; 9 years ago (reconstruction)
- Rebuilt: November 2, 2017; 8 years ago

Traffic
- 2025: 1,424,322 ▲6.8%
- Rank: 236 out of 423
Services
Preceding station	New York City Subway	Following station
Ninth Street D N R W toward Forest Hills–71st Avenue	Local	25th Street D N R W toward Bay Ridge–95th Street
Location
Location within New York City Subway
Location within New York City
Location within New York
Track layout
Street map
Station service legend
Symbol	Description
Stops all times except late nights	Stops all times except late nights
Stops late nights only	Stops late nights only
Stops rush hours only	Stops rush hours only
Stops rush hours in the peak direction only	Stops rush hours in the peak direction only

The Prospect Avenue station is a local New York City Subway station on the BMT Fourth Avenue Line in Brooklyn. It is located at Prospect Avenue and Fourth Avenue near the convergence of the Gowanus, Greenwood Heights, Park Slope, and South Park Slope neighborhoods. It is served by the R train at all times. The D and N trains also stop here during late nights, and some rush-hour W trains stop here in the peak direction.

The Prospect Avenue station was constructed as part of the Fourth Avenue Line, which was approved in 1905. Construction on the segment of the line that includes Prospect Avenue started on December 20, 1909, and was completed in May 1912. The station opened on June 22, 1915, as part of the initial portion of the BMT Fourth Avenue Line to 59th Street. The station's platforms were lengthened in 1926–1927, and again during a renovation in 1968–1970. The station was also renovated in 1970 and 2017.

== History ==
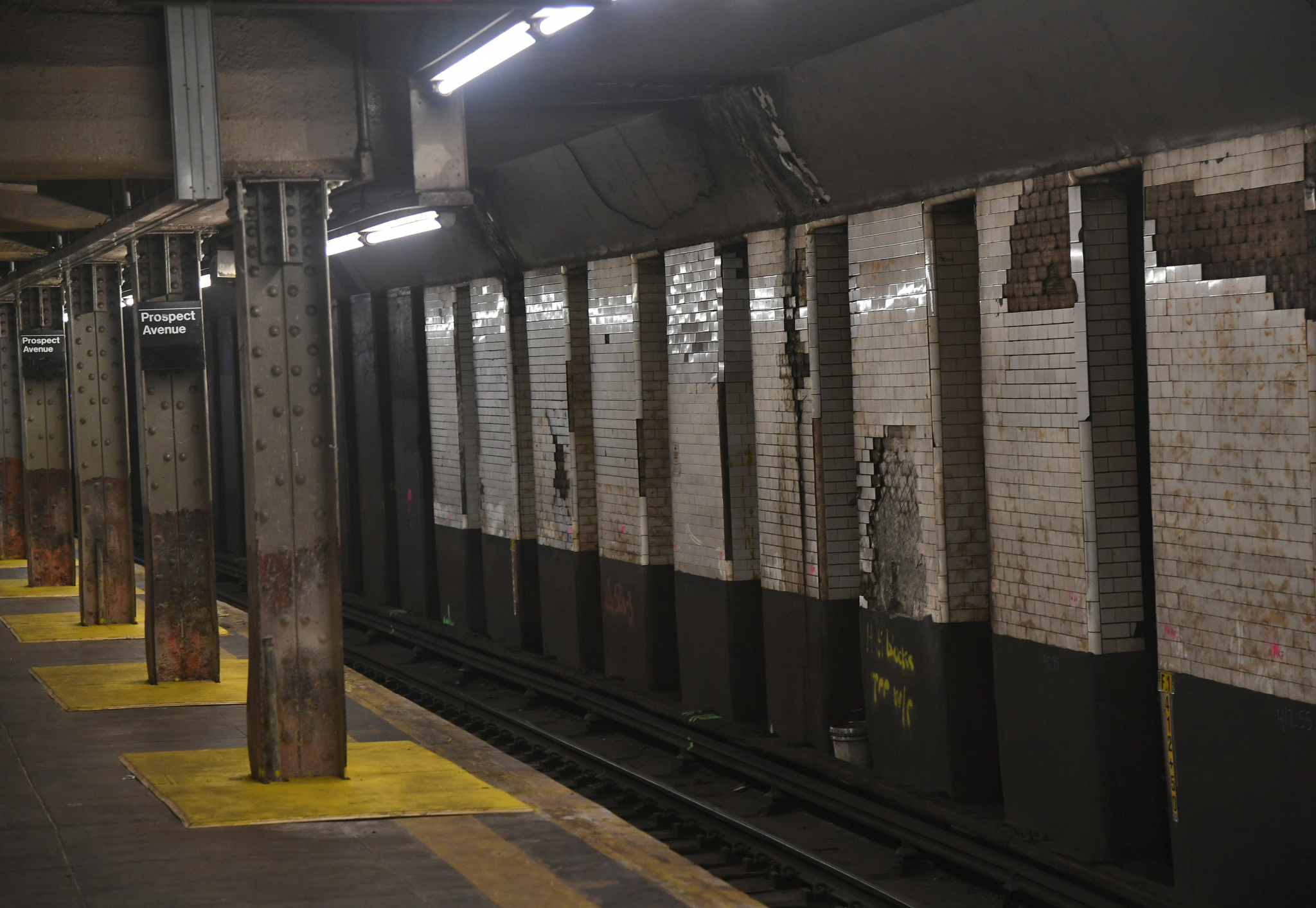
The station prior to renovation

=== Construction ===
The Prospect Avenue station was constructed as part of the Fourth Avenue Line, the plan for which was initially adopted on June 1, 1905. The Rapid Transit Commission was succeeded on July 1, 1907, by the New York State Public Service Commission (PSC), which approved the plan for the line in late 1907. The contract for the section of the line that included the Prospect Avenue station, Route 11A3, which extended from 10th Street to 27th Street, was awarded on May 22, 1908, to the Tidewater Building Company and Thomas B. Bryson for $2,043,162.31 (equivalent to $73,213,000 in 2025). The New York City Board of Estimate approved the contract on October 29, 1909. Construction on the segment started on December 20, 1909, and was completed in May 1912.

As part of negotiations between New York City, the Brooklyn Rapid Transit Company (BRT), and the Interborough Rapid Transit Company for the expansion of the city's transit network, the line was leased to a subsidiary of the BRT. The agreement, known as Contract 4 of the Dual Contracts, was signed on March 19, 1913. Prospect Avenue opened on June 22, 1915, as part of an extension of the subway to Coney Island, which included the Fourth Avenue Line north of 59th Street as well as the entire Sea Beach Line. The station's opening was marked with a competition between two trains heading from Chambers Street station in Manhattan to the Coney Island station, one heading via the West End Line and the other via the Sea Beach Line; the latter got to Coney Island first.

=== Renovations ===
==== 1920s ====
On June 27, 1922, the New York State Transit Commission commissioned its engineers to examine platform-lengthening plans for 23 stations on the lines of the Brooklyn–Manhattan Transit Corporation (BMT), the successor to the BRT, to accommodate eight-car trains. As part of the project, Prospect Avenue's platforms would have been lengthened from 435 feet (133 m) to 530 feet (160 m). Though the Transit Commission ordered the BMT to lengthen these platforms in September 1923, no further progress was made until February 16, 1925, when the New York City Board of Transportation (NYCBOT) commissioned its engineers to examine platform-lengthening plans for this and eleven other stations along the Fourth Avenue Line. It estimated the project would cost $633,000 (equivalent to $11,621,000 in 2025). The NYCBOT received bids for the project on February 25, 1926. The contract was awarded to the Corson Construction Company for $345,021 (equivalent to $6,275,000 in 2025). The extensions opened on August 1, 1927.

==== 1950s and 1960s ====
The city government took over the BMT's operations on June 1, 1940. In July 1959, the New York City Transit Authority (NYCTA) announced that it would install fluorescent lighting at the Prospect Avenue station and five other stations along the Fourth Avenue Line for between $175,000 and $200,000. Bids on the project were to be advertised on August 7, 1959 and completed by fall 1960.

In the 1960s, the NYCTA started a project to lengthen station platforms on its lines in Southern Brooklyn to 615 feet (187 m) to accommodate 10-car trains. On July 14, 1967, the NYCTA awarded a contract to conduct test borings at eleven stations on the Fourth Avenue Line, including Prospect Avenue, to the W. M. Walsh Corporation for $6,585 (equivalent to $63,583 in 2025) in preparation of the construction of platform extensions. The NYCTA issued an invitation for bids on the project to extend the platforms at stations along the Fourth Avenue Line between Pacific Street and 36th Street, including those at Prospect Avenue, on March 28, 1969. Funding for the renovation projects came out of the NYCTA's 1969–1970 Capital Budget, costing $8,177,890 (equivalent to $71,798,000 in 2025) in total.

As part of the renovation project, the station's platforms were extended, and the station's elaborate mosaic tile walls were covered over with 8-by-16-inch (20 by 41 cm) white cinderblock tiles. The latter change, which was also made to 15 other stations on the BMT Broadway and Fourth Avenue Lines, was criticized for being dehumanizing. The NYCTA spokesman stated that the old tiles were in poor condition and that the change was made to improve the appearance of stations and provide uniformity. Furthermore, it did not consider the old mosaics to have "any great artistic merit".

==== 2017 ====
Under the Metropolitan Transportation Authority's 2015–2019 Capital Program, the station, along with thirty other New York City Subway stations, were scheduled to undergo a complete overhaul as part of the Enhanced Station Initiative. Upgrades were to include cellular service, Wi-Fi, USB charging stations, interactive service advisories and maps. From January to May 2016, Grimshaw Architects worked on a design for the station's renovation, with Arup Group acting as a consultant. The contract for Package 1 of the renovations, which covers renovations at the Prospect Avenue, 53rd Street, and Bay Ridge Avenue stations on the BMT Fourth Avenue Line, was awarded on November 30, 2016 to Citnalta-Forte Joint Venture for $72 million, the first design–build contract in the subway system's history. The station closed on June 5, 2017 for these renovations, and reopened on November 2, 2017, a month ahead of schedule.

== Station layout ==
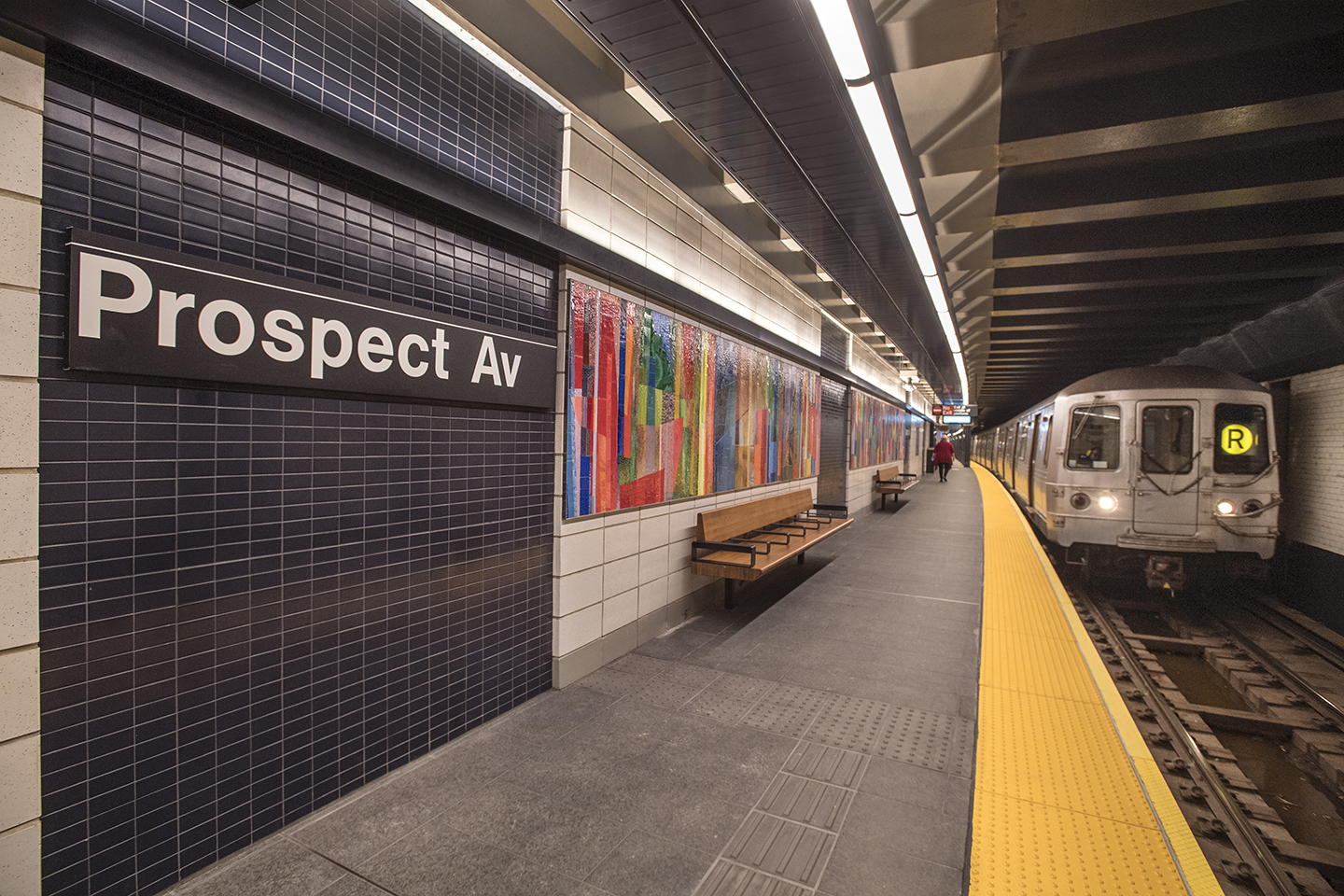
R46 R train at the southbound platform

This underground station is a local station with four tracks and two side platforms. The R stops here at all times; some rush-hour W trains stop here in the peak direction; and the D and N stop here during late nights but use the center express tracks during daytime hours. The station is between Ninth Street to the north and 25th Street to the south. The station has a full curtain wall separating the local and express tracks, which have several openings that allow a view of the tracks from the platforms. The walls were intended to improve ventilation, as passing trains would push air forward, rather than to the sides of the tunnel.

The platforms have no columns except on the north ends, where the platforms were extended in 1970. These I-beam columns are cream colored. The ceiling in this area is lower.

Prior to the station's 1970 renovation, it was finished all in white and marble tile, and it had its own color scheme to allow regular passengers to identify the station based only on the color of the marble trimmings. Since that renovation, the station walls have consisted of white cinderblock tiles, except for small recesses in the walls, which contain blue-painted cinderblock tiles. The blue cinderblock field contains the station-name signs and white text pointing to the exits. During the 2017 renovation, the cinder block tiles installed in the 1970s were restored, and new black floor tiles and yellow platform treads were installed. The blue cinder block recessions installed in the 1970s were covered with small black mosaic tiles.

The 2017 artwork at this station consists of mosaics by Monika Bravo. They signify local landmarks such as the Brooklyn Army Terminal.

=== Exits ===
The station's only fare controls are near the center of each platform, at the platform level. Until the 2017 renovations, they had their original trim line, colored brown with "P" at regular intervals, a bank of turnstiles, and token booth. The Manhattan-bound side has two street stairs to the east sidewalk of Fourth Avenue, with one going to the southeastern corner of Prospect Avenue and Fourth Avenue, and the other going to the northeastern corner of 17th Street and Fourth Avenue. Meanwhile, the Bay Ridge-bound side has one to the northwestern corner of 17th Street and Fourth Avenue. There are no crossovers or crossunders to allow free transfer between directions.
