= 45th Street station (BMT Fourth Avenue Line) =

New York City Subway station in Brooklyn

45 Street
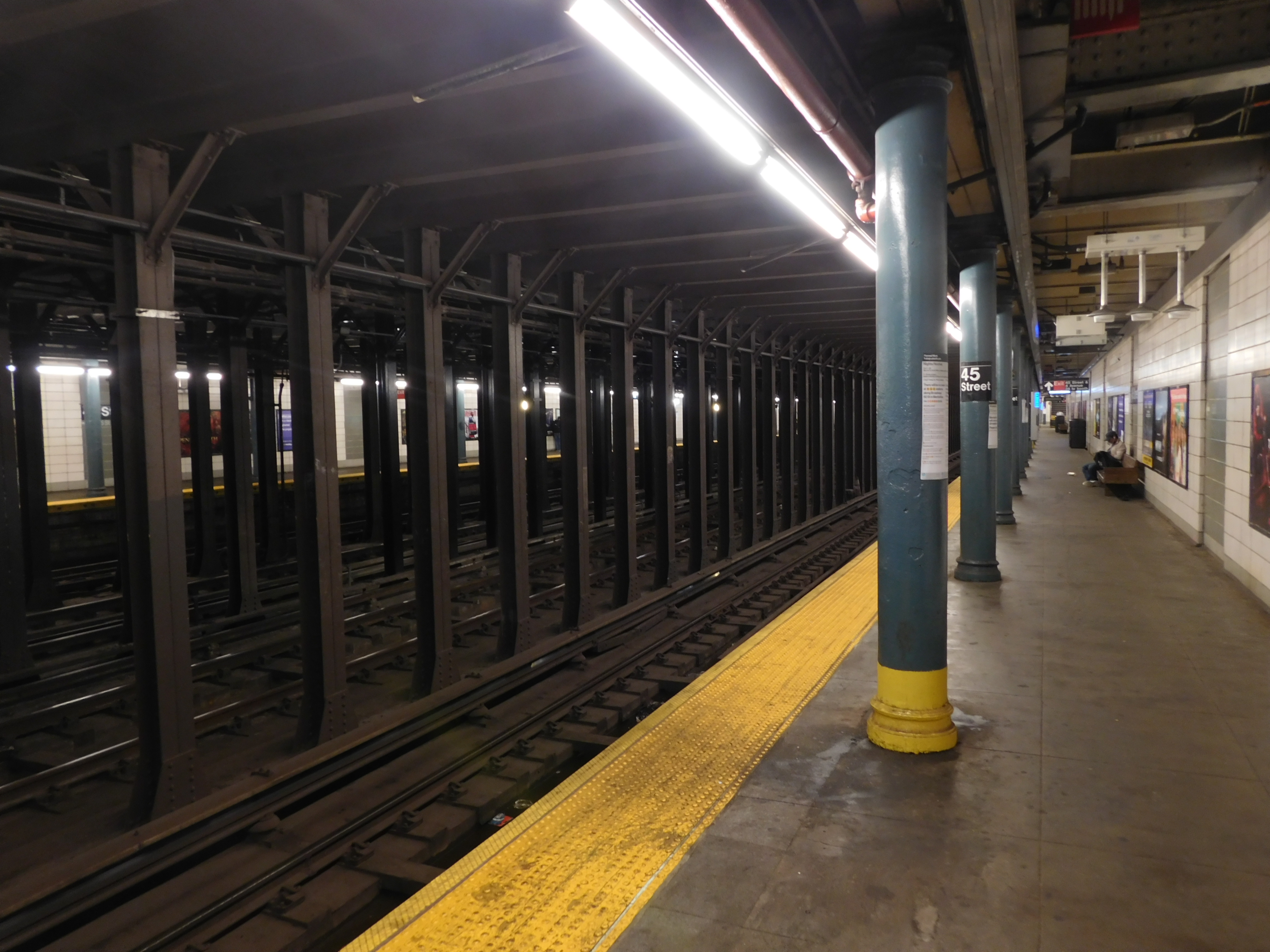
- Manhattan bound platform

Station statistics
- Address: 45th Street & Fourth Avenue; Brooklyn, New York
- Borough: Brooklyn
- Locale: Sunset Park
- Coordinates: 40°38′58″N 74°00′34″W
- Division: B (BMT)
- Line: BMT Fourth Avenue Line
- Services: N (late nights, and limited rush hour service in the reverse-peak direction); R (all times); W (limited rush hour service only)
- Structure: Underground
- Platforms: 2 side platforms
- Tracks: 4

Other information
- Opened: September 22, 1915 (111 years ago)

Traffic
- 2025: 1,998,599 ▲12.7%
- Rank: 178 out of 423
Services
Preceding station	New York City Subway	Following station
36th Street N R W toward Forest Hills–71st Avenue	Local	53rd Street N R W toward Bay Ridge–95th Street
Location
Location within New York City Subway
Location within New York City
Location within New York
Track layout
Street map
Station service legend
Symbol	Description
Stops all times except late nights	Stops all times except late nights
Stops late nights only	Stops late nights only
Stops rush hours only	Stops rush hours only
Stops rush hours in the peak direction only	Stops rush hours in the peak direction only

The 45th Street station is a local station on the BMT Fourth Avenue Line of the New York City Subway. Located at 45th Street and Fourth Avenue in Sunset Park, Brooklyn, it is served by the R train at all times. The N train also stops here during late nights, and some rush-hour W trains stop here.

The 45th Street station was constructed as part of the Fourth Avenue Line, which was approved in 1905. Construction on the segment of the line that includes 45th Street started on March 15, 1913, and was completed in 1915. The station opened on September 22, 1915, after the opening of the initial portion of the BMT Fourth Avenue Line to 59th Street. The station's platforms were lengthened in 1926–1927, and again during a renovation in 1968–1970.

== History ==
=== Construction and opening ===
The 45th Street station was constructed as part of the Fourth Avenue Line, the plan for which was initially adopted on June 1, 1905. The Rapid Transit Commission was succeeded on July 1, 1907, by the New York State Public Service Commission (PSC), which approved the plan for the line in late 1907.

As part of negotiations between New York City, the Brooklyn Rapid Transit Company (BRT), and the Interborough Rapid Transit Company for the expansion of the city's transit network, the line was leased to a subsidiary of the BRT. The agreement, known as Contract 4 of the Dual Contracts, was signed on March 19, 1913. In 1912, during the Dual System negotiations, the construction of an extension of the Fourth Avenue subway from 43rd Street to 89th Street, just south of the 86th Street station, was recommended. The proposal was approved by the Board of Estimate on February 15, 1912. The PSC directed its chief engineer to create plans on June 14, 1912. The two contracts for the extension, Route 11B, were awarded on September 16, 1912, to Degnon Construction Company for a combined $3.8 million (equivalent to $126.8 million in 2025).

Construction on Route 11B1, the section of the extension between 43rd Street and 61st Street, which includes the 45th Street station, began on March 15, 1913. Originally, this section was planned to have two tracks, but after the connection to the Sea Beach Line was added to the plan during the middle of construction, the plan was changed to four tracks. This section was completed in 1915. The section of the line running through the 45th Street station opened on June 22, 1915, as part of an extension of the subway to Coney Island, which included the Fourth Avenue Line north of 59th Street as well as the entire Sea Beach Line. The line's opening was marked with a competition between two trains heading from Chambers Street station in Manhattan to the Coney Island station, one heading via the West End Line and the other via the Sea Beach Line; the latter got to Coney Island first. However, the 45th and 53rd Street stations remained closed, despite being technically complete, since the stations were being used by a contractor to haul dirt out. The stations opened on September 22, 1915.

=== Station renovations ===
==== 1920s ====
On June 27, 1922, the New York State Transit Commission commissioned its engineers to examine platform-lengthening plans for 23 stations on the lines of the Brooklyn–Manhattan Transit Corporation (BMT), the successor to the BRT, to accommodate eight-car trains. As part of the project, 45th Street's platforms would have been lengthened from 490 feet (150 m) to 530 feet (160 m). Though the Transit Commission ordered the BMT to lengthen these platforms in September 1923, no further progress was made until February 16, 1925, when the New York City Board of Transportation (NYCBOT) commissioned its engineers to examine platform-lengthening plans for this and eleven other stations along the Fourth Avenue Line. It estimated the project would cost $633,000 (equivalent to $11,621,000 in 2025). The NYCBOT received bids for the project on February 25, 1926. The contract was awarded to the Corson Construction Company for $345,021 (equivalent to $6,275,000 in 2025). The extensions opened on August 1, 1927.

==== 1960s ====
The city government took over the BMT's operations on June 1, 1940. In the 1960s, the New York City Transit Authority (NYCTA) started a project to lengthen station platforms on its lines in Southern Brooklyn to 615 feet (187 m) to accommodate 10-car trains. On July 14, 1967, the NYCTA awarded a contract to conduct test borings at eleven stations on the Fourth Avenue Line, including 45th Street, to the W. M. Walsh Corporation for $6,585 (equivalent to $63,583 in 2025) in preparation of the construction of platform extensions. The NYCTA issued an invitation for bids on the project to extend the platforms at stations along the Fourth Avenue Line between this station and Bay Ridge–95th Street on May 3, 1968.

As part of the renovation project, the station's platforms were extended 85 feet (26 m). The northbound was extended to the north, and the southbound platform was extended to the south. In addition, the station's elaborate mosaic tile walls were covered over with 8-by-16-inch (20 by 41 cm) white cinderblock tiles. The latter change, which was also made to 15 other stations on the BMT Broadway and Fourth Avenue Line, was criticized for being dehumanizing. The NYCTA spokesman stated that the old tiles were in poor condition and that the change was made to improve the appearance of stations and provide uniformity. Furthermore, it did not consider the old mosaics to have "any great artistic merit".

== Station layout ==
This underground station has four tracks and two side platforms. The R stops here at all times; some rush-hour W trains stop here in the peak direction; and the N stops here during late nights, but uses the center express tracks to bypass the station during daytime hours. The station is between 36th Street to the north and 53rd Street to the south. The platforms are offset as the northbound platform extends further north than the southbound one.

Columns run along the entire length of both platforms at regular intervals and are painted dark grey-blue. Every other column has the standard black name plate with white text. All are round except for the ones near the staircases to the station's main entrance, which are I-beams; this is where the platforms were extended in 1970.

Prior to the station's 1970 renovation, it was finished all in white and marble tile, and it had its own color scheme to allow regular passengers to identify the station based only on the color of the marble trimmings. Since the renovation, the station walls have consisted of white cinderblock tiles, except for small recesses in the walls, which contain gray-painted cinderblock tiles. The gray cinderblock field contains the station-name signs and white text pointing to the exits.

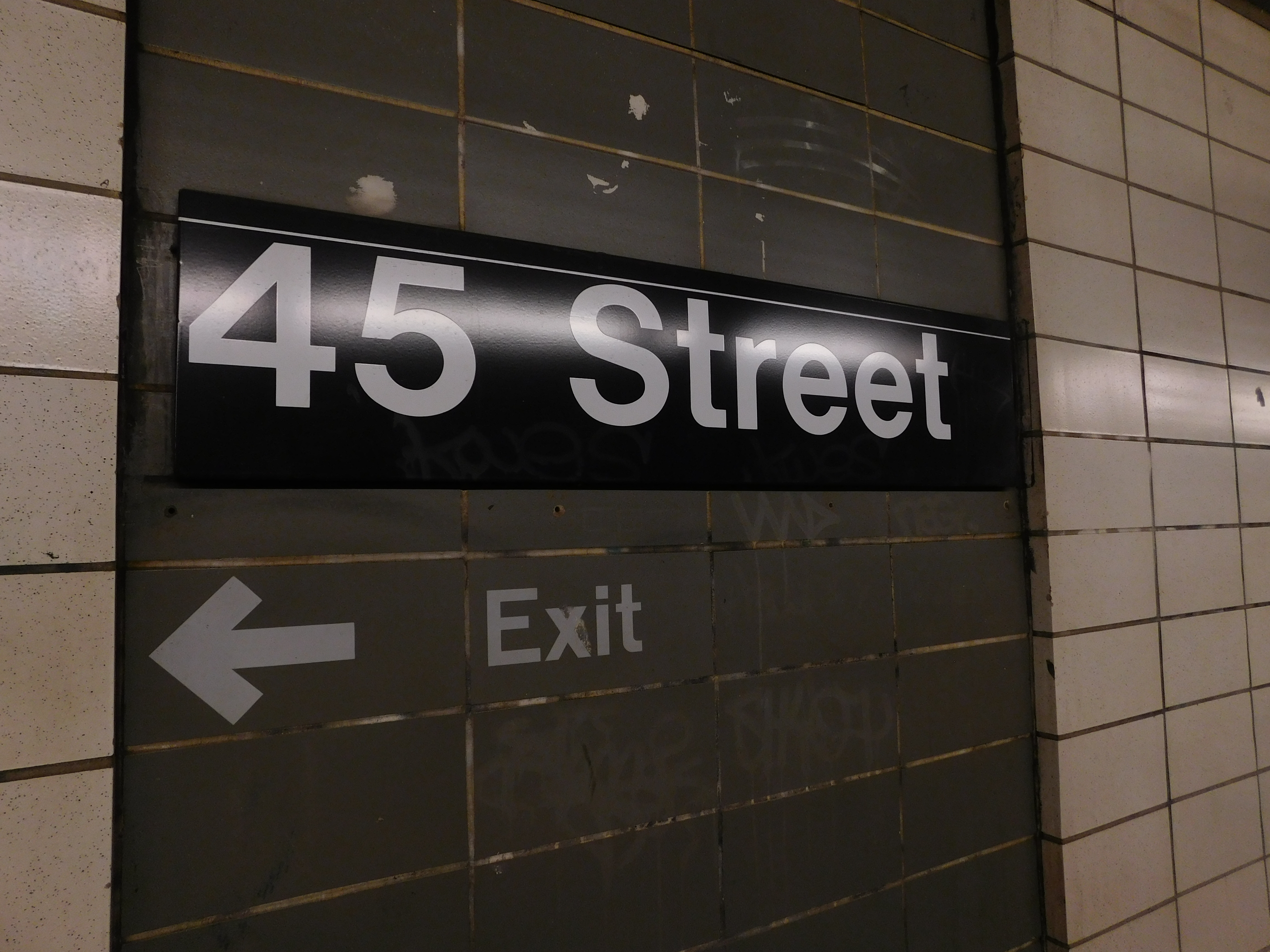
Station name tablet

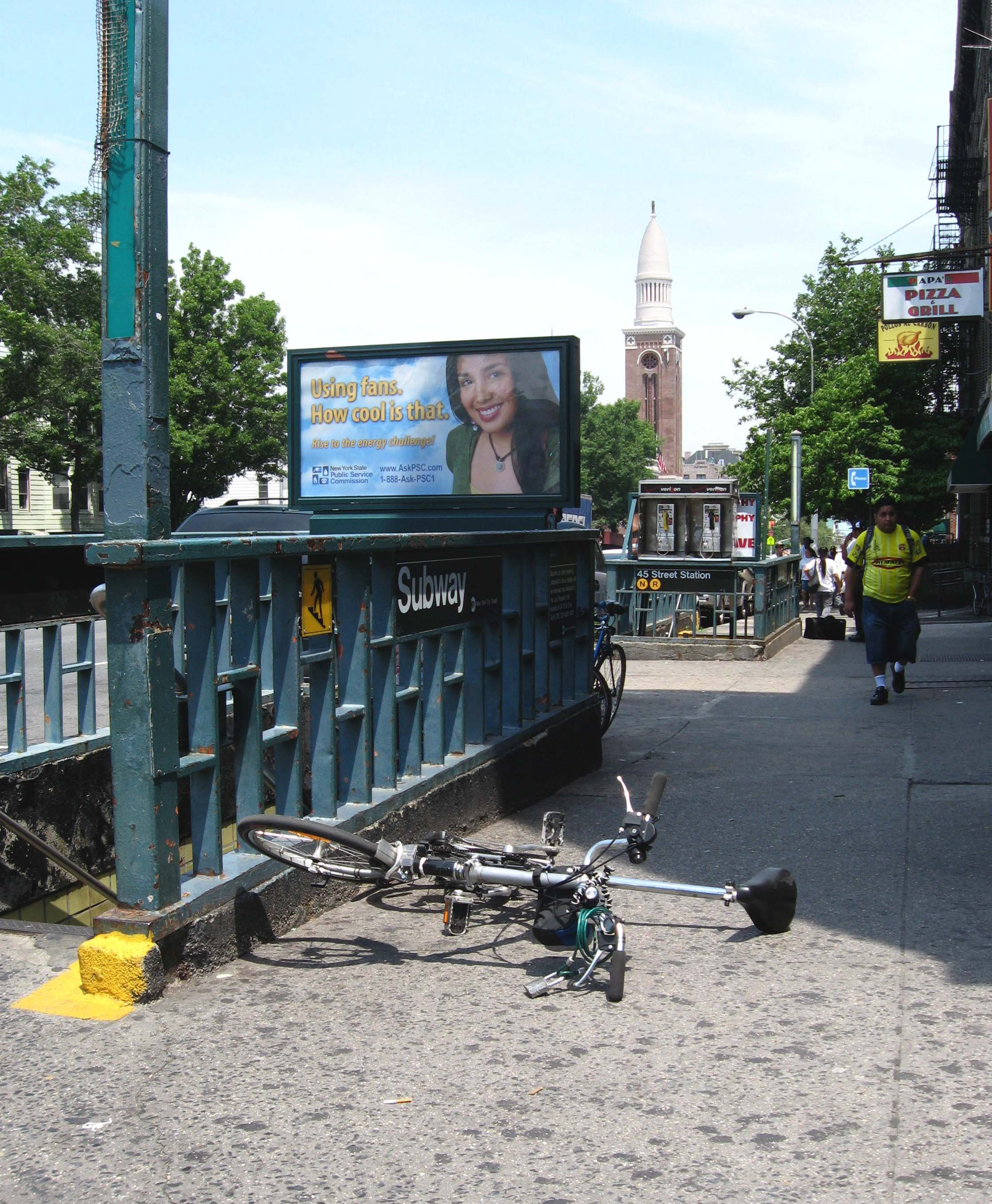
Eastern street stair

=== Exits ===
The station's main entrance is a mezzanine above the platforms and tracks at the north end. It has two staircases to the Manhattan-bound platform and one to the Bay Ridge-bound one at the extreme south end, a waiting area that allows a free transfer between directions, turnstile bank, token booth, and two staircases to the northern corners of 45th Street and 4th Avenue. The mezzanine contains some of the original mosaic directional and arrow signs. The one by the staircases to the southbound platform says "Down Town trains" while the one by the Manhattan-bound platform staircases says "Up Town Trains."

The southbound platform formerly had an exit-only at the center that led to 46th Street. Evidence of this includes a gated door on the platform wall and adjacent "EXIT" signs. The northwest corner exit was closed after it was accidentally destroyed by nearby construction workers. On May 16, 1979, Community Board 7 held a meeting to determine whether residents wanted the entrance closed. The board's chairman cited crime as a reason to close the entrance. The New York City Transit Authority promised to comply with the wish of the board, and the entrance was closed.
