= 86th Street station (BMT Fourth Avenue Line) =

New York City Subway station in Brooklyn

86 Street
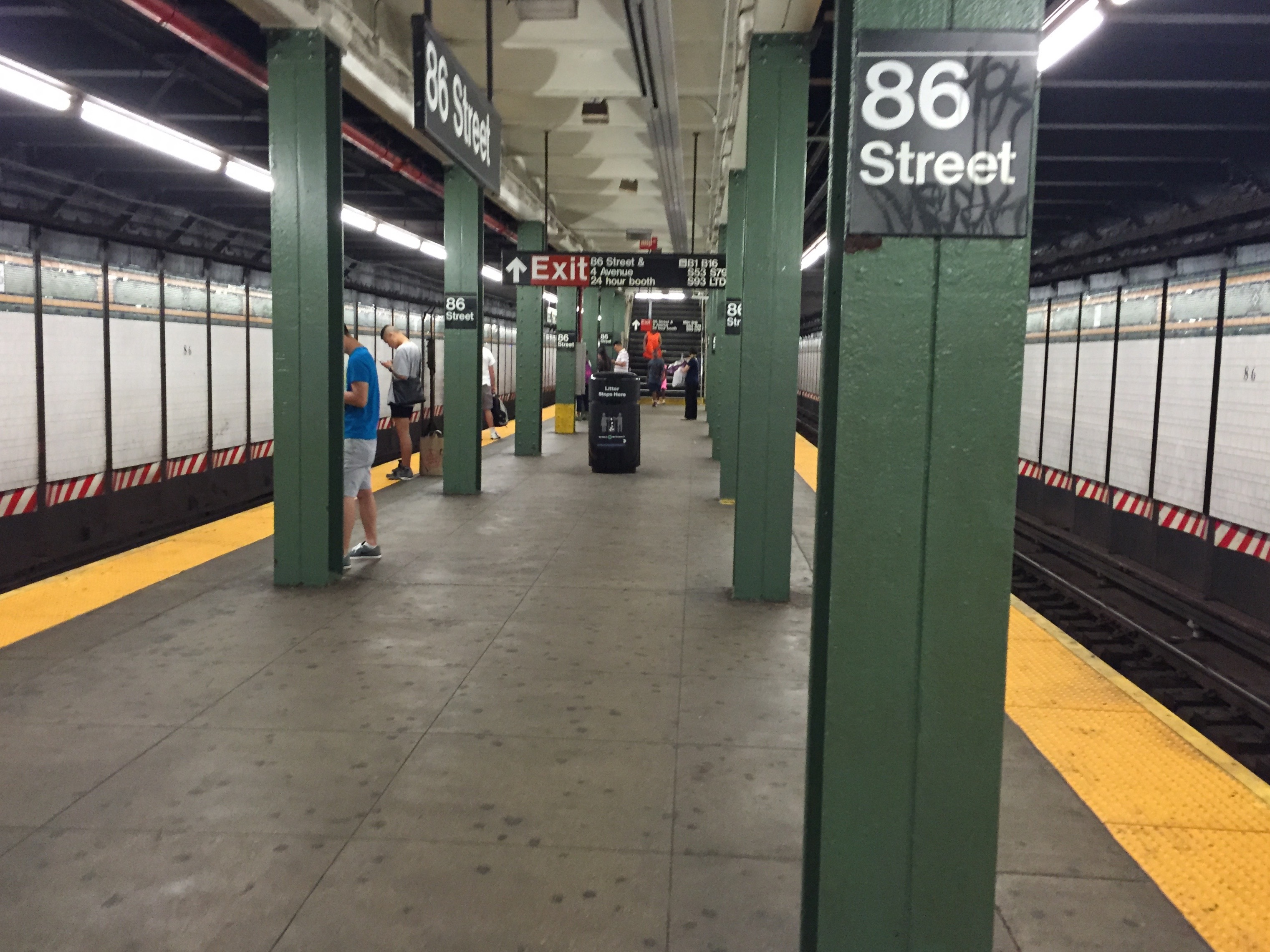
- Station platform

Station statistics
- Address: 86th Street & Fourth Avenue; Brooklyn, New York
- Borough: Brooklyn
- Locale: Bay Ridge, Fort Hamilton
- Coordinates: 40°37′22″N 74°01′42″W
- Division: B (BMT)
- Line: BMT Fourth Avenue Line
- Services: R (all times)
- Transit: NYCT Bus: B1, B16, S53, S79 SBS, S93
- Structure: Underground
- Platforms: 1 island platform
- Tracks: 2

Other information
- Opened: January 15, 1916 (110 years ago)
- Accessible: Yes
- Former/other names: 86th Street - Bay Ridge

Traffic
- 2025: 2,738,880 ▲6%
- Rank: 140 out of 423
Services
Preceding station	New York City Subway	Following station
77th Street toward Forest Hills–71st Avenue	R (New York City Subway service)	Bay Ridge–95th Street Terminus
Location
Location within New York City Subway
Location within New York City
Location within New York
Track layout
Street map
Station service legend
Symbol	Description
Stops all times	Stops all times

The 86th Street station is a station on the BMT Fourth Avenue Line of the New York City Subway. Located at 86th Street and Fourth Avenue on the border of Bay Ridge and Fort Hamilton in Brooklyn, it is served by the R train at all times.

The 86th Street station was constructed as part of the Fourth Avenue Line. Though it was originally planned to be a four-track express station with two island platforms, only the western platform and tracks were ultimately built. Construction on the segment of the line that includes 86th Street started in 1913, and was completed in 1915. The station opened on January 15, 1916, as part of an extension of the BMT Fourth Avenue Line from 59th Street to 86th Street. The station's platforms were lengthened in 1926–1927, and it was renovated in the 1970s and again in the late 2000s. The 86th Street station was renovated between 2018 and 2020, and elevators were added to make the station compliant with the Americans with Disabilities Act of 1990.

The 86th Street station serves as a bus hub and terminal for several New York City Transit bus routes.

== History ==
=== Construction and opening ===
The 86th Street station was constructed as part of the Fourth Avenue Line. The plan for the line was initially adopted on June 1, 1905, before being approved by the Appellate Division of the Supreme Court of New York on June 18, 1906, after the Rapid Transit Commission was unable to get the necessary consents of property owners along the planned route. The Rapid Transit Commission was succeeded by the New York State Public Service Commission (PSC) on July 1, 1907, and the PSC approved the plan for the line in October and November 1907.

As part of negotiations between New York City and the Brooklyn Rapid Transit Company (BRT), and the Interborough Rapid Transit Company for the expansion of the city's transit network, the line was leased to a subsidiary of the BRT. The agreement, known as Contract 4 of the Dual Contracts, was signed on March 19, 1913. In 1912, during the Dual System negotiations, the construction of an extension of the Fourth Avenue subway from 43rd Street to 89th Street, just south of the 86th Street station, was recommended. This recommendation was approved by the Board of Estimate on February 15, 1912. The PSC directed its chief engineer to create plans on June 14, 1912. The two contracts for the extension, Route 11B, were awarded on September 16, 1912, to the Degnon Construction Company for a combined $3.8 million (equivalent to $126.8 million in 2025).

On January 24, 1913, construction began on Route 11B2, which includes this station and extends between 61st Street and 89th Street. Construction was completed on this section in 1915. 86th Street opened on January 15, 1916, as part of an extension of the BMT Fourth Avenue Line from 59th Street to 86th Street. The station was the original terminal for the line until a one-stop southward extension to Bay Ridge–95th Street opened on October 25, 1925.

=== Station renovations ===
==== 1920s ====
On June 27, 1922, the New York State Transit Commission commissioned its engineers to examine platform-lengthening plans for 23 stations on the lines of the Brooklyn–Manhattan Transit Corporation (BMT), the successor to the BRT, to accommodate eight-car trains. As part of the project, Bay Ridge Avenue's platforms would have been lengthened from 495 feet (151 m) to 530 feet (160 m). Progress on the extensions did not occur until February 16, 1925, when the New York City Board of Transportation (NYCBOT) commissioned its engineers to examine platform-lengthening plans for this and eleven other stations along the Fourth Avenue Line. It estimated the project would cost $633,000 (equivalent to $11,621,015 in 2025). The BMT had been ordered by the Transit Commission to lengthen these platforms since September 1923. The NYCBOT received bids for the project on February 25, 1926. The contract was awarded to the Corson Construction Company for $345,021 (equivalent to $6,274,583 in 2025). The extensions opened on August 1, 1927.

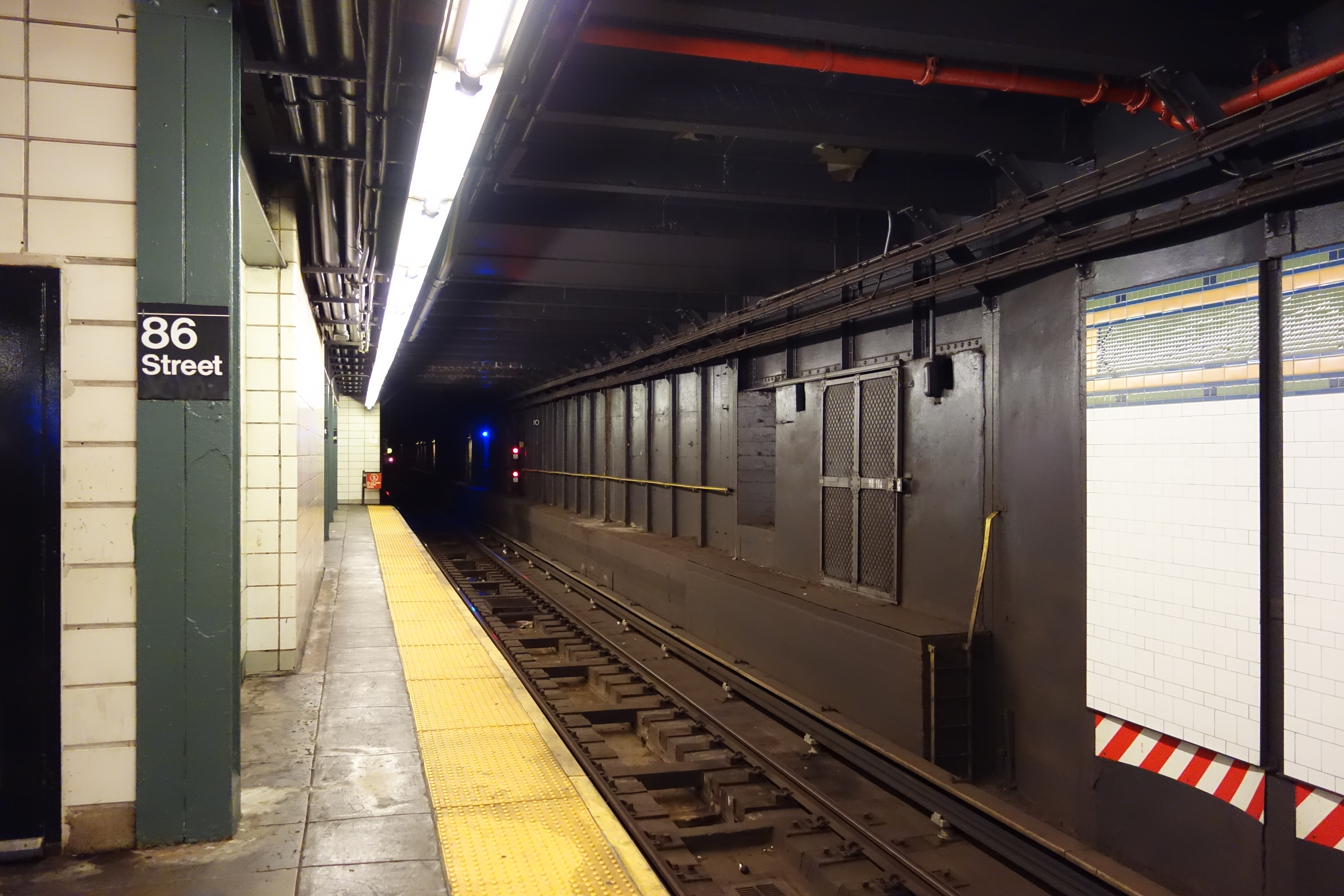
Location of platform extension at 1970 at the southern end of the station

==== 1960s ====
The city government took over the BMT's operations on June 1, 1940. In the 1960s, the New York City Transit Authority (NYCTA) started a project to lengthen station platforms on its lines in Southern Brooklyn to 615 feet (187 m) to accommodate 10-car trains. On July 14, 1967, the NYCTA awarded a contract to conduct test borings at eleven stations on the Fourth Avenue Line, including Bay Ridge Avenue, to the W. M. Walsh Corporation for $6,585 (equivalent to $63,583 in 2025) in preparation of the construction of platform extensions (equivalent to $63,583 in 2025). The NYCTA issued an invitation for bids on the project to extend the platforms at stations along the Fourth Avenue Line between 45th Street station and Bay Ridge–95th Street, including this station, on May 3, 1968.

However, work had already started on the platform extension project in February 1968. As part of the renovation project, the station's platform were extended 85 feet (26 m) to the south, and the station's elaborate mosaic tile walls were removed. The latter change, which was also made to 15 other stations on the BMT Broadway and Fourth Avenue Line, was criticized for being dehumanizing. The NYCTA spokesman stated that the old tiles were in poor condition. Furthermore, it did not consider the old mosaics to have "any great artistic merit".

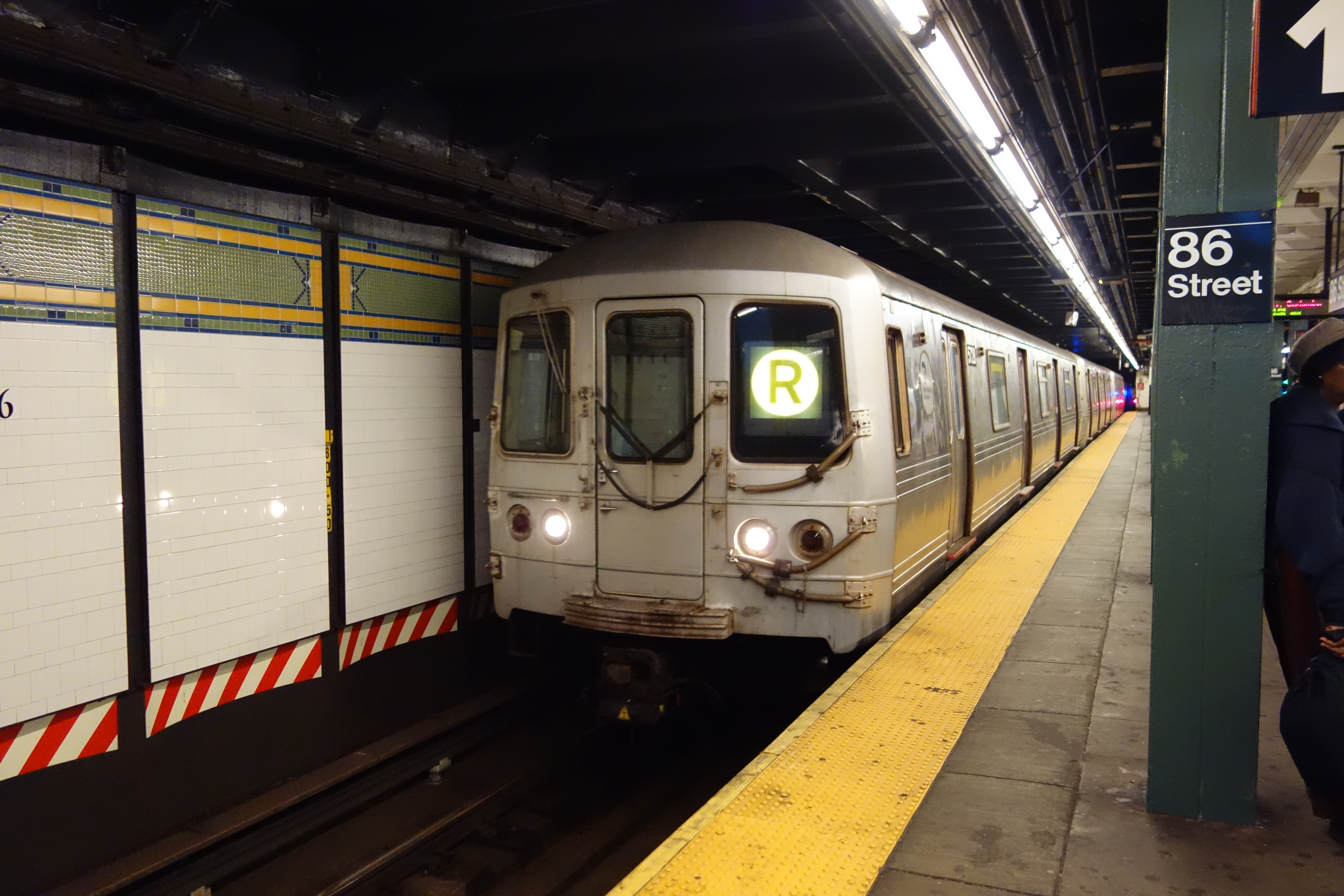
A view of the new wall tiling as an out-of-service R train passes through the station.

==== 2010s ====
In 2007, then-13th District Congressman Vito Fossella and 22nd District State Senator Marty Golden secured funding for an $13.8 million renovation, completed in 2011. The renovation repaired staircases, rebuilt the station's ventilation, and installed new tiling for walls and floors as well as ADA-compliant yellow safety treads along the platform edges. The platform walls were originally tiled, but removed during renovations in 1970. The modern renovation restored these tiles, and added an Arts for Transit glass mosaic inspired by the old homes of the Bay Ridge neighborhood. As part of the Metropolitan Transportation Authority (MTA)'s 2010–2014 Capital Program, funding was provided for a 25-station renewal program, which focused on renovating stations with a high concentration of components rated 3.5 or worse on a five-point scale, with 5 being the highest. 33% of components at this station were found to rate 3.5 or worse. In the 2010–2014 MTA Capital Program, funding was provided to design renovations to the station to make it fully compliant with accessibility guidelines under the Americans with Disabilities Act of 1990 as it was selected as the New York City Transportation Disabled Committee requested that the station substitute the 95th Street station as one of the 100 Key Stations required to be made ADA-accessible. Funding for the construction of the project was provided in the 2015–2019 MTA Capital Program.

As part of the project, two elevators were added, one from the mezzanine to the platform and the other from the mezzanine to the street at the southeastern corner of 86th Street and Fourth Avenue. It was decided not to place the elevator at the station's 85th Street entrance since that entrance was not at the proper depth, and since that entrance was not staffed. To provide adequate space for the sidewalk elevator, to allow for a widened staircase, and to work around sewers underneath the sidewalk, a sidewalk bulb-out was installed. The bulb-out also allows buses to stop without having to pull in and out of traffic. The decision to remove a lane from Fourth Avenue for the construction of the elevator was criticized by members of the local community board who believed that the change would be unsafe for pedestrians. To provide space for the elevator in the mezzanine, two staircases to the platform were relocated, with the elevator, and a new ramp leading to it, located in between them. In order to provide space for one of the new staircases to the platform, the station's longtime vendor lost its lease in February 2017.

A second staircase was added from the mezzanine to the southwestern corner of Fourth Avenue and 86th Street as part of the project. Equipment and crew rooms in the mezzanine were reconfigured, including the installation of an ADA-compliant employee restroom and locker room, to accommodate mechanical and electrical infrastructure for the elevators. In addition, the station agent booth was modified to a wheelchair-friendly height, and railings, turnstiles, platform panels, Braille signage, and powered gates were reconfigured to provide full accessibility. New artwork and mosaic bands were also installed as part of the project. As part of the project, new maps were posted on station walls as a test. The station's communications systems were also upgraded as part of the project. The MTA released the contract for the project to prospective bidders in fall 2017. The $17.9 million contract for the project was awarded to El Sol Contracting in December 2017.

Construction on the elevators started in June 2018 and was expected to be completed by the end of May 2020. However, because of resource shortages caused by the COVID-19 pandemic in New York City, completion was pushed back to July 29, 2020. The final cost of the project was $36,055,077.

== Station layout ==
This underground station has two tracks and a single island platform. The R stops here at all times. The station is between 77th Street to the north and Bay Ridge–95th Street to the south.

The platform and mezzanines above have dark green columns, and alternate columns have the standard black station name plate with white lettering reading "86 Street". The track walls had their mosaic tiling restored as part of the station's 2011 renovation. The southern section of the station is where the platform was extended in 1970, and they have no mosaic trims or tiles along the wall, instead including an extension of the tunnel benchwall. The platform has several employee-facilities that have a mosaic trim line.

=== Provisions ===
The Fourth Avenue Line south of 59th Street was built as a two-track structure under the west side of Fourth Avenue with plans for two future tracks on the east side of the street. The current platform was originally supposed to be the southbound platform; the current northbound track would have become the southbound express track if the two additional tracks were built. To the north of this station, the southbound track curves around the platform while the northbound track remains straight. The four tracks were planned mainly to facilitate the Staten Island Tunnel, which would have necessitated express service, although the tunnel was never constructed. In addition, there are large portions of the mezzanines that are now used for employees only.

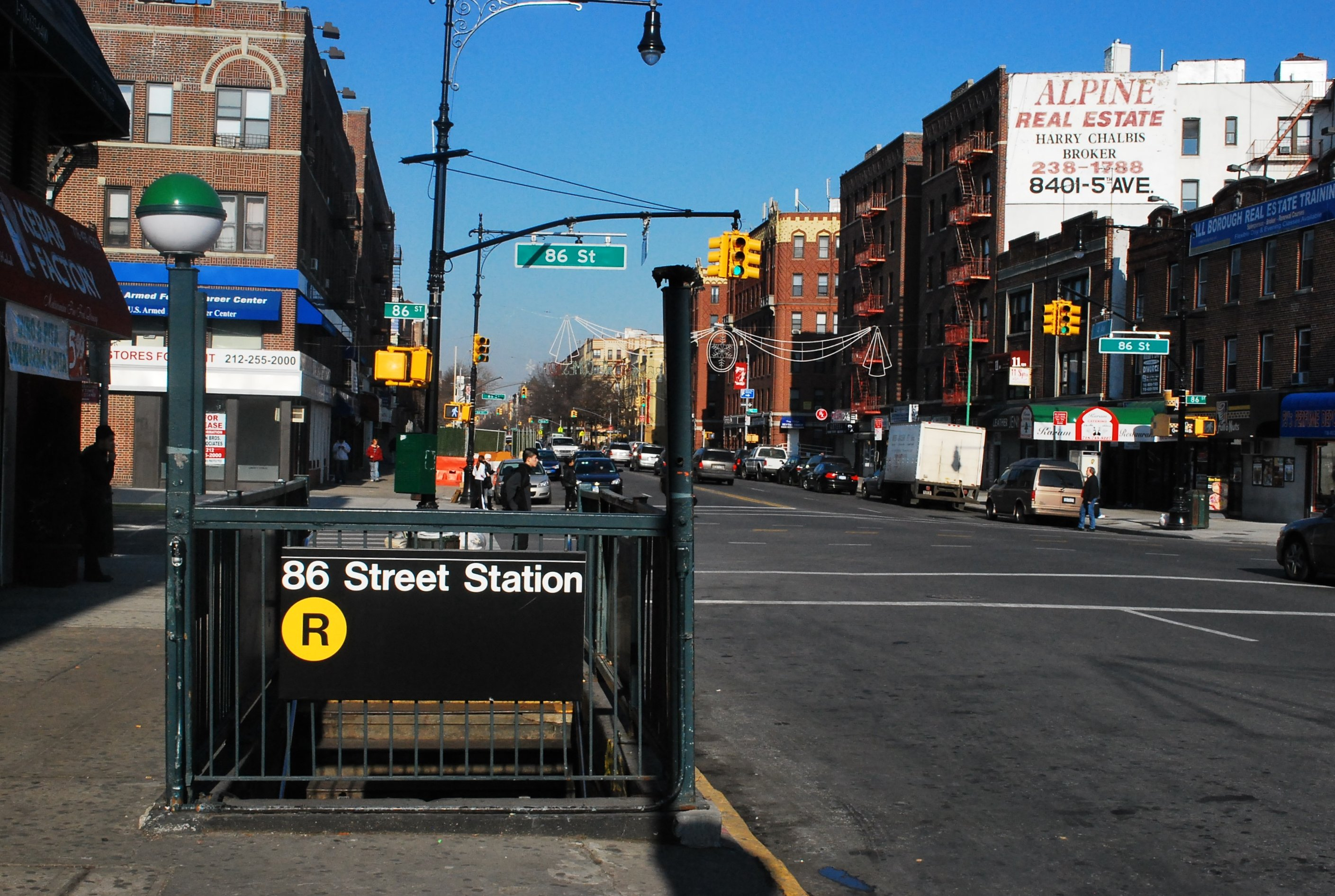
View of the staircase at the southwestern corner of 86th Street and Fourth Avenue

=== Exits ===
This station has two entrances/exits. The full-time one is at the south end. Two staircases from the platform go up to a mezzanine that has a turnstile bank. A bodega was located within fare control until it was evicted in order to accommodate an elevator. Outside fare control, there is a token booth, and three staircases going up to either southern corner of 86th Street and Fourth Avenue, with two leading to the southwestern corner. An elevator leads to the southeastern corner of the intersection. The station's other fare control area is unstaffed. Two staircases from the platform, one of which is now closed, go up to a mezzanine that has two High Entry/Exit Turnstiles and a single staircase going up to the southwest corner of 85th Street and Fourth Avenue. Both mezzanines have their original mosaic trim line.

== Bus stop ==
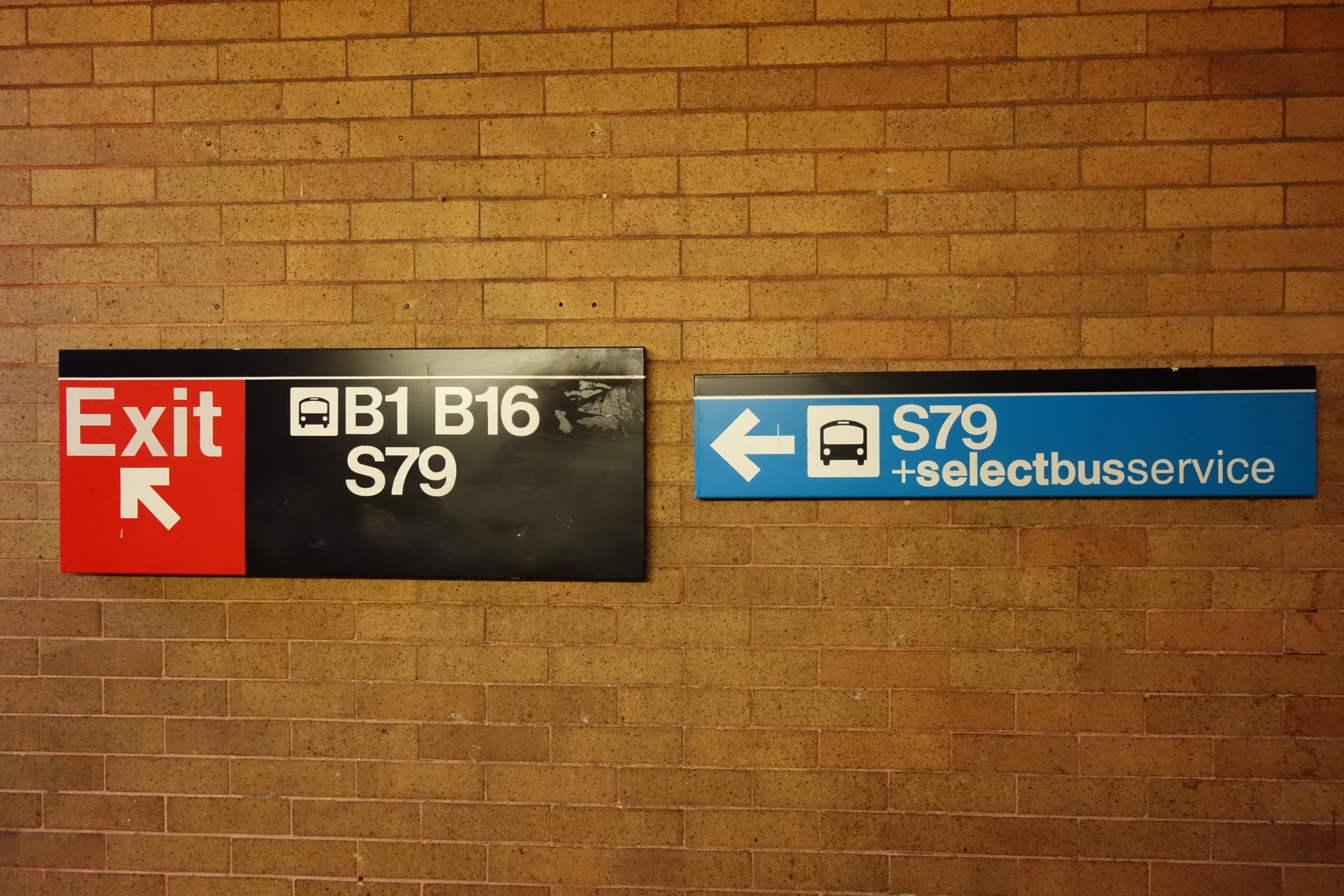
Signs in the mezzanine showing bus connections.

The station serves as a hub and terminal for several New York City bus routes, including the S53 local and S93 limited buses and the S79 Select Bus Service to Staten Island.

Bus stop location	Route	Terminus
86th Street at 4th Avenue SE corner	B1	Manhattan Beach; Oriental Boulevard and Mackenzie Street
86th Street at 4th Avenue SE corner	B16	Prospect Lefferts Gardens; Prospect Park Subway Station
86th Street at 4th Avenue NW corner	B16	Fort Hamilton; 4th Avenue and Shore Road
4th Avenue at 87th Street NW corner	S53	Port Richmond; Port Richmond Terminal; Port Richmond Avenue and Richmond Terrace
4th Avenue at 87th Street NW corner	S93	College of Staten Island; Administrative buildings
4th Avenue at 86th Street SE corner	S79 SBS	Staten Island Mall; Marsh Avenue south of Ring Road
