= Whitestone Branch =

Former Long Island Rail Road branch

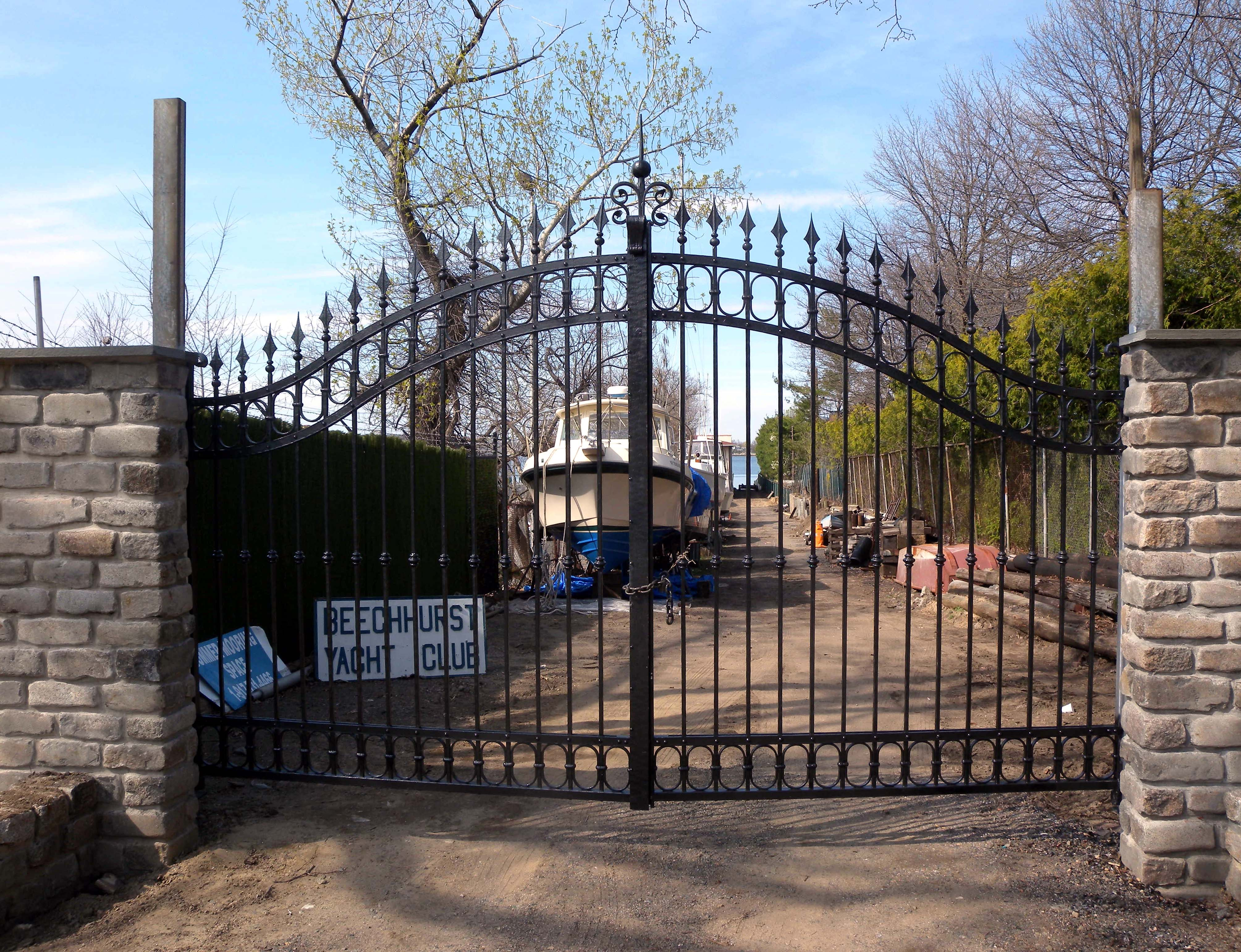
- Beechhurst Yacht Club, the site of the former northern terminus of the Whitestone Branch

Overview
- Status: Abandoned
- Owner: Long Island Rail Road
- Locale: Queens, New York City
- Termini: Willets Point (south); Whitestone (north)
- Stations: 5

Service
- Type: Passenger and Freight
- System: Long Island Rail Road
- Operator(s): Flushing and North Side Railroad; Long Island Rail Road

History
- Opened: 1869
- Closed: February 19, 1932

Technical
- Number of tracks: 1–2
- Track gauge: 4 ft 8 1/2 in (1,435 mm)
- Electrification: 1912

The Whitestone Branch was a branch of the Long Island Rail Road, running north and east along the left bank of the Flushing River from the Port Washington Branch near the modern Willets Point/Flushing sections of Queens, New York. It crossed the river on one of the three bridges that were later torn down for the Van Wyck Expressway, then ran north along Flushing Bay and east along the East River to Whitestone.

== History ==
Originally conceived as a branch of the Flushing and North Side Railroad that was intended to lead into Westchester County, New York (a connection that never materialized) in 1869, it was consolidated into the Long Island Rail Road in 1876 when its owners, the Poppenhusen family, took over the bankrupt LIRR. It later became part of a subsidiary called the Long Island City and Flushing Railroad.

On October 12, 1912, the branch was electrified. In the 1920s, the branch began to lose patronage and the LIRR sought to rid itself of the line, despite calls for improvements in service. There was a proposal for the city-owned Independent Subway System to buy the line and incorporate it into the New York City Subway system. The deal was not successful, most likely due to the numerous grade crossings that would have been extremely costly to remove. The Interstate Commerce Commission allowed the LIRR to abandon the line in 1932.

Most of the branch was removed, except a small section of the line leading to the Corona Yard which remained well into the 1970s when the LIRR closed the Corona Yard and turned it over to the New York City Transit Authority for subway use. Today, only a small section of track remains just east of Mets–Willets Point station, branching off from the Port Washington Branch east of the station. The Flushing–Main Street station of the Port Washington Branch was so named to distinguish it from the Whitestone's Flushing–Bridge Street station. Despite the closing of the Bridge Street station, the LIRR continues to use the name "Main Street" for the Port Washington Branch station to this day.

A spur of the line near the Flushing River was abandoned when it went underwater in 1983. Private homes have been built over the section of the line in Whitestone Landing.

== Flushing Bay Freight Spur ==
The Flushing Bay Freight Spur was a freight-only spur that lead to a freight dock on Flushing Bay just west of the Flushing River delta. It began at the Whitestone Branch just north of the junction with the Port Washington Branch, then crossed a junction with a spur of the Woodside Branch leading to Great Neck Junction and the Central Branch, and a second junction with Woodside Branch that lead to the Whitestone Branch, (Note: Seyfried, Vincent F. "The Long Island Rail Road: A Comprehensive History, Part Two: The Flushing, North Shore & Central Railroad" (1961). "There were in addition two branches: the four mile spur to Whitestone and a shorter one of one and one quarter miles to Hempstead. The Flushing Creek area was the throat of the system with two main junction points: Whitestone Junction on the west side, where the Whitestone Branch began, and Central Junction on the east bank, where the Central trains turned off for Babylon. When the Woodside Branch opened in April 1874, four more miles of single track were added, plus an additional trestle bridge and connecting spur from Central Junction to the Flushing Bay dock.") and crossing a short bridge before finally terminating at the freight dock. No trace of the spur is known as of 2016.

== Stations ==
The entire line was abandoned on February 15, 1932.

Miles from Long Island City	Station	Date opened	Date closed	Connections / notes
Port Washington Branch diverges
Junction with Flushing Bay Freight Spur
Woodside Branch diverges
7.9	Flushing – Bridge Street	1870	1932	Named to distinguish it from Flushing–Main Street station
9.3	College Point	1868	1932	The station depot was razed in September 1934 after local complaints of its deterioration.
10.3	Malba	1909	1932	Only station on the line built by LIRR; At the beginning of its operation, it was a flag stop
11.0	Whitestone	1869	1932	Connections to Whitestone Trolley
11.7	Whitestone Landing	1886	1932	Originally Beechhurst Yacht Club Station
