= Whitestone station =

Train station in New York City (1869–1932)

Whitestone

General information
- Location: 15th Avenue between 149th and 150th Streets; Whitestone, Queens, New York
- Coordinates: 40°47′14″N 73°48′52″W
- Line: Whitestone Branch
- Platforms: 1 side platform
- Tracks: 3

History
- Opened: 1869
- Closed: February 15, 1932
- Electrified: October 12, 1912

Former services
Preceding station	Long Island Rail Road	Following station
Malba toward Corona	Whitestone Branch	Whitestone Landing Terminus
Location

Whitestone station was located on the Whitestone Branch of the Long Island Rail Road in Whitestone, in Queens of New York City. The station was located on 15th Avenue (which later became the eastbound service road on the Cross Island Parkway which ran on the Branch's Right-of-way) from 149th Street to 150th Street. It connected to the Whitestone Trolley. The station had a coal pocket underneath it and shipped some of it out.

== History ==
The first train to the station ran on 1869 where a temporary depot was built. The permanent station was built in January 1872. Originally, it was built by the Whitestone and Westchester Railroad but before it could get to the station it was eaten up by the Long Island Rail Road in 1886. A boiler blew up on September 25, 1872.

In 1912, the station was electrified, along with the rest of the line. On February 19, 1932, Whitestone closed and was later demolished along with the rest of the line. The Cross Island Parkway was built over the former location of the station.

== Station layout ==
Whitestone had a brick station house at the center of the platform on 15th Avenue where the only exit was. The Station Master and his family lived in the top two stories of the building until at least a week after abandonment. The station had one side platform. Most of the platform was wood except for the extreme east end. The platform was low until 1912. There was one passing track and one storage track.
