= Utica Avenue =

Avenue in Brooklyn, New York

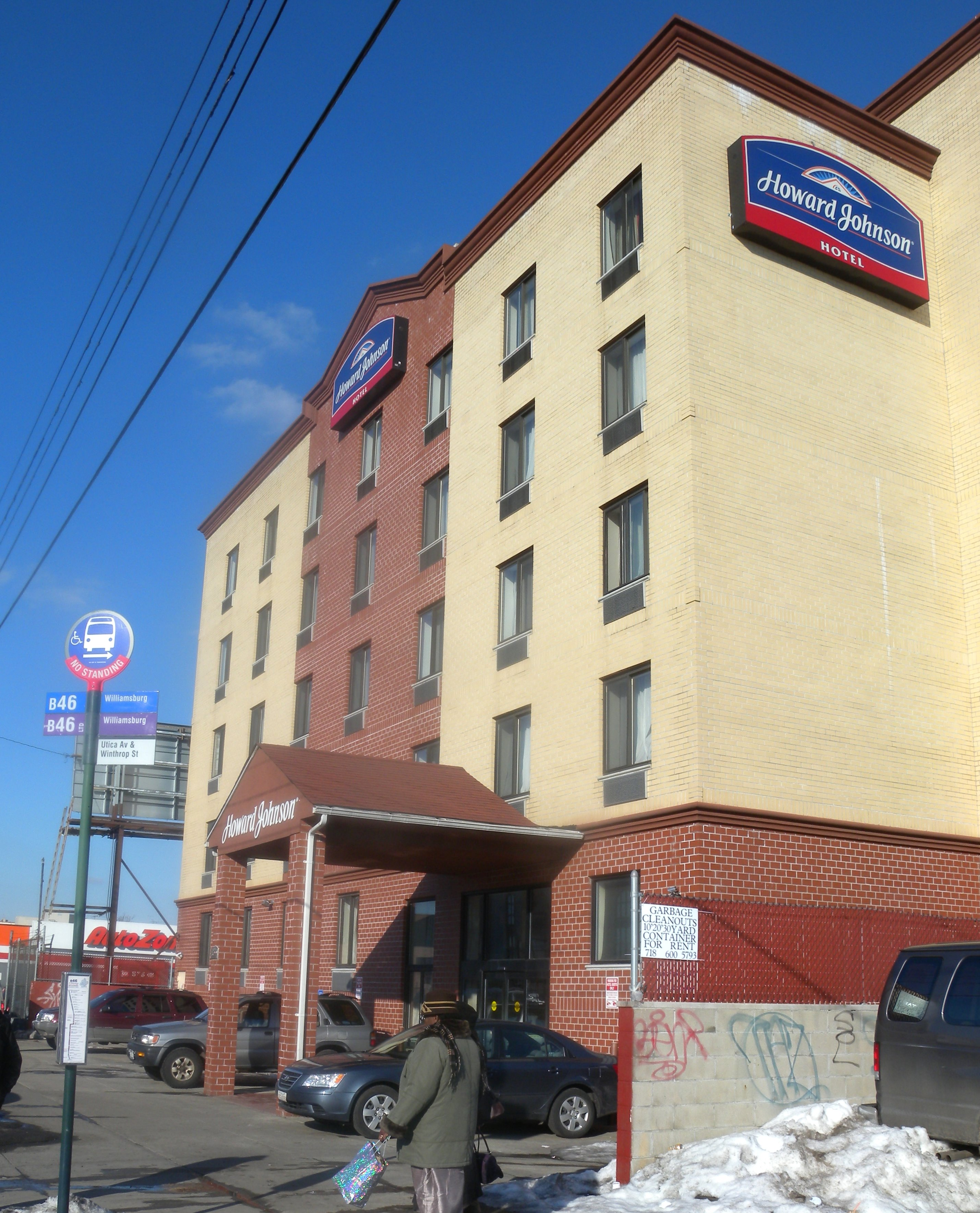
Howard Johnson Hotel on northern Utica Avenue

Utica Avenue is a major avenue in Brooklyn, New York City, New York, United States. It is one of several named for the city of Utica in Upstate New York. It runs north–south and occupies the position of East 50th Street in the Brooklyn street grid, with East 49th Street to its west and East 51st Street to its east for most of its path. The south end of Utica Avenue is at Flatbush Avenue; its north end is at Fulton Street, beyond which it is continued by Malcolm X Boulevard (formerly Reid Avenue) in Bedford–Stuyvesant. Malcolm X Boulevard continues to Broadway, where it terminates on Broadway between Lawton Street and Hart Street.

The avenue runs primarily through the neighborhoods of Flatlands, Flatbush, and Crown Heights, intersecting with other main streets such as Flatlands Avenue, Kings Highway, and Linden Boulevard. Utica Avenue is a four-lane avenue throughout its entire stretch, and an important commercial street.

== Public transportation ==
Utica Avenue is served by the following:

- The New York City Subway's IRT Eastern Parkway Line (3 and 4 trains) has one station on Eastern Parkway
- The New York City Subway’s IND Fulton Street Line (A and C trains) has one station on Fulton Street.
- The B46 and B46 SBS bus lines serve the entire avenue.
- The southbound B17 runs on the avenue between Eastern Parkway, where it originates, and Remsen Avenue.

=== Proposed subway extension ===
Many proposals have been made for a subway under Utica Avenue, beginning as early as 1919. These proposals include a line suggested in 1929 as part of the IND Second System, and in 1968 under the Program for Action.

In April 2015, New York City Mayor Bill de Blasio announced a new plan for building a subway line under Utica Avenue as a branch of the IRT Eastern Parkway Line to Flatbush Avenue, near Kings Plaza. The MTA Board allocated $5 million for a feasibility study, the Utica Avenue Subway Extension Study, for this proposal in the MTA's 2015–2019 Capital Program. In August 2016, it was reported that the MTA was looking into an extension of the IRT Nostrand Avenue Line along Flatbush Avenue to Marine Park, which would allow trains to serve Kings Plaza. Planning on the Utica Avenue Line stalled because it was no longer viewed as a priority by the MTA. However, planning resumed in April 2019 when New York City Transit joined city agencies in launching the Utica Avenue Transit Improvement Study. The study will look into a subway extension, improved bus rapid transit, and a new light rail line. On April 8, 2019, the MTA started to meet with local officials and survey local residents. Since the study occurred concurrently with the redesign of Brooklyn bus routes, the MTA decided to prioritize the Utica Avenue transit study.
