= Whitestone Landing station =

Train station in New York City (1886–1932)

Whitestone Landing
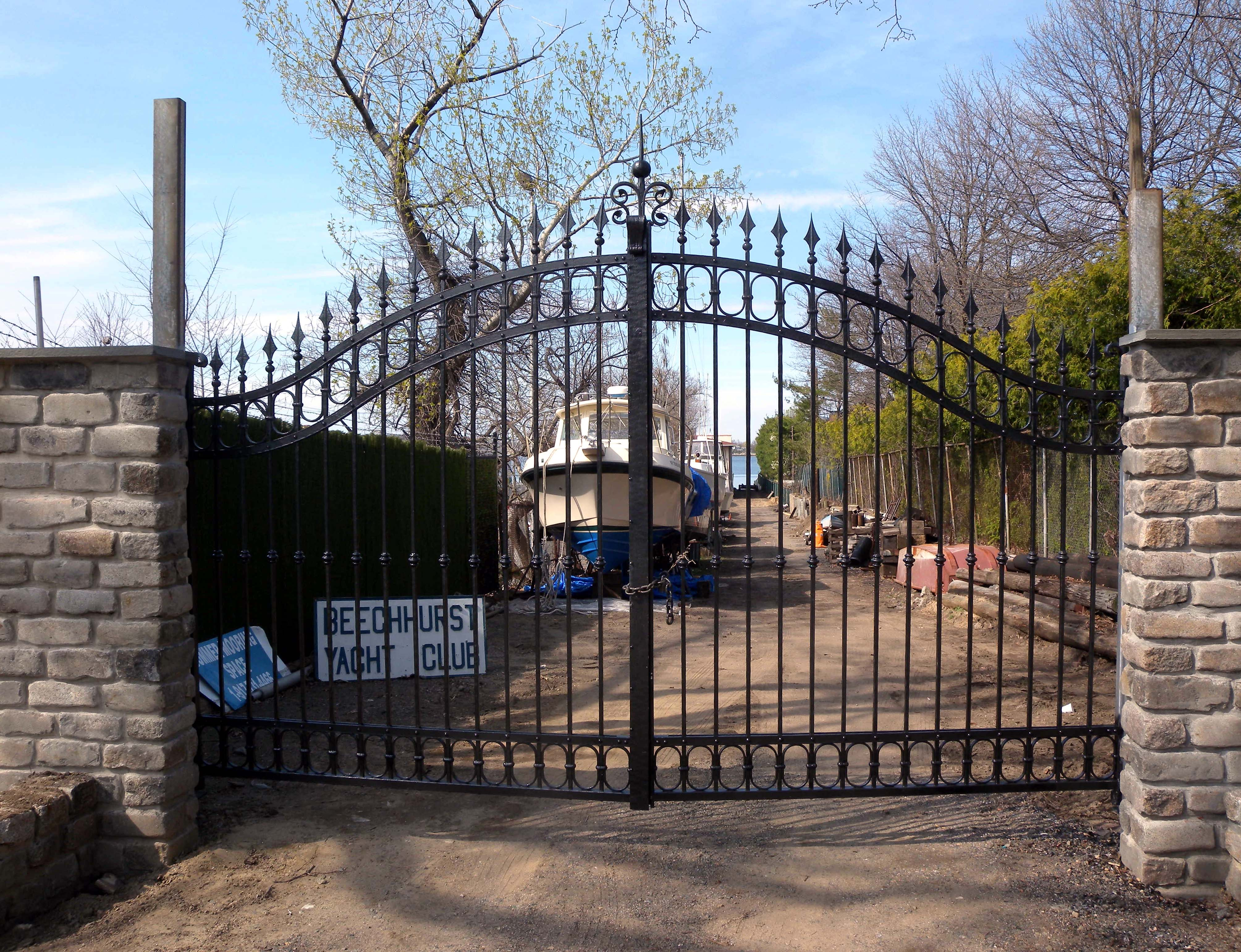
- The former site of the Whitestone Landing station, currently the Beechurst Yacht Club.

General information
- Location: 154th Street between 9th and 10th Avenues; Whitestone, Queens, New York
- Coordinates: 40.793866°N 73.807611°W
- Line: Whitestone Branch
- Platforms: 2 side platforms
- Tracks: 2

History
- Opened: August 9, 1886
- Closed: February 15, 1932
- Electrified: October 12, 1912
- Former names: Beechhurst Yacht Club

Former services
Preceding station	Long Island Rail Road	Following station
Whitestone toward Corona	Whitestone Branch	Terminus
Location

Whitestone Landing was the terminal station on the Whitestone Branch from its opening on August 9, 1886, to the Whitestone Branch's abandonment in February 1932. In June 1892 the station was moved back from the shoreline. On February 15, 1932, the Whitestone Branch was abandoned and all stations on the branch closed.

Whitestone Landing consisted of two tracks with a track fence in between them and two lower level platforms. The northern platform was made of wood and was 420 feet long. The southern platform was made of cinder and was 252 feet long. Also at one of the platforms was a one-story frame passenger depot, which had electric lights, a drinking fountain, was heated by stoves and a bathroom, and a Staff cabin, which was open from September 1913 to October 1926. North of the station was Whitestone Landing Yard, which had 7 sidings.

The station's location is approximately at 154th Street between 9th Avenue and 10th Avenue in Whitestone.
