= Lili Réthi =

- Born: 19 November 1894; Vienna, Austria
- Notable work: "American Industry at War"

Lili Réthi (November 19, 1894 – 1969) was an artist and illustrator. Born in Vienna, Austria, she left Germany to avoid a commission from Hermann Göring glorifying the Third Reich. She eventually became an American citizen. Réthi illustrated over 50 books during her career and her works are included in major galleries and museums. She is particularly known for her drawings of building and construction projects such as the Verrazzano–Narrows Bridge.

== Early life ==
Réthi was born in Vienna, Austria. In 1917 Réthi enrolled in the Art School for Women and Girls (Kunstschule für Frauen und Mädchen) in Vienna, Austria, where she studied under Otto Friedrich, a Jugendstil painter. She continued her training at the Graphischen Lehr- und Versuchsanstalt in Vienna.

== Career ==
During her early career in Europe, Réthi drew a diverse group of building and construction projects, including shipyards in Hamburg, Germany and canals in Belgium. Although she identified herself as a Social Democrat, she received a commission in Germany from Nazi politician Hermann Göring to execute drawings that glorified the Third Reich. To avoid completing the commission, she left Germany by explaining that she had a prior commitment to complete drawings of a bridge in Denmark.

She moved to London and created illustrations for two posters in the late 1930s. She traveled to the United States in 1939 to illustrate the World’s Fair for The Illustrated London News and applied to citizenship upon arrival.

In 1943, Réthi was the subject of a three-person exhibition "American Industry at War" at the Metropolitan Museum of Art in New York, which featured drawings of war production plants by Réthi as well as architect Hugh Ferriss and artist James Sessions.

One of Réthi’s best-known projects in the United States was her documentation through drawing of the construction of the Verrazzano–Narrows Bridge, which connected Staten Island and Brooklyn. 34 of these drawings were exhibited in the 1964 World’s Fair New York City Pavilion. Réthi was a member of the Royal Society of Arts.

Réthi illustrated over 50 books during her career, including The Bridge: The Building of the Verrazano-Narrows Bridge (1964) by Gay Talese, The Witchcraft of Salem Village (1956) by Shirley Jackson, and Franklin D. Roosevelt's Hyde Park (1947).

Réthi's works are in the collection of the National Gallery of Art, the Museum of the City of New York, The Postal Museum in London, the Yale University Art Gallery, and the MTA Bridges and Tunnels Special Archive collection. The Lili Réthi Papers are held in the Archives Center, National Museum of American History in Washington, D.C.
