= Verrazzano–Narrows Bridge =

Suspension bridge in New York City

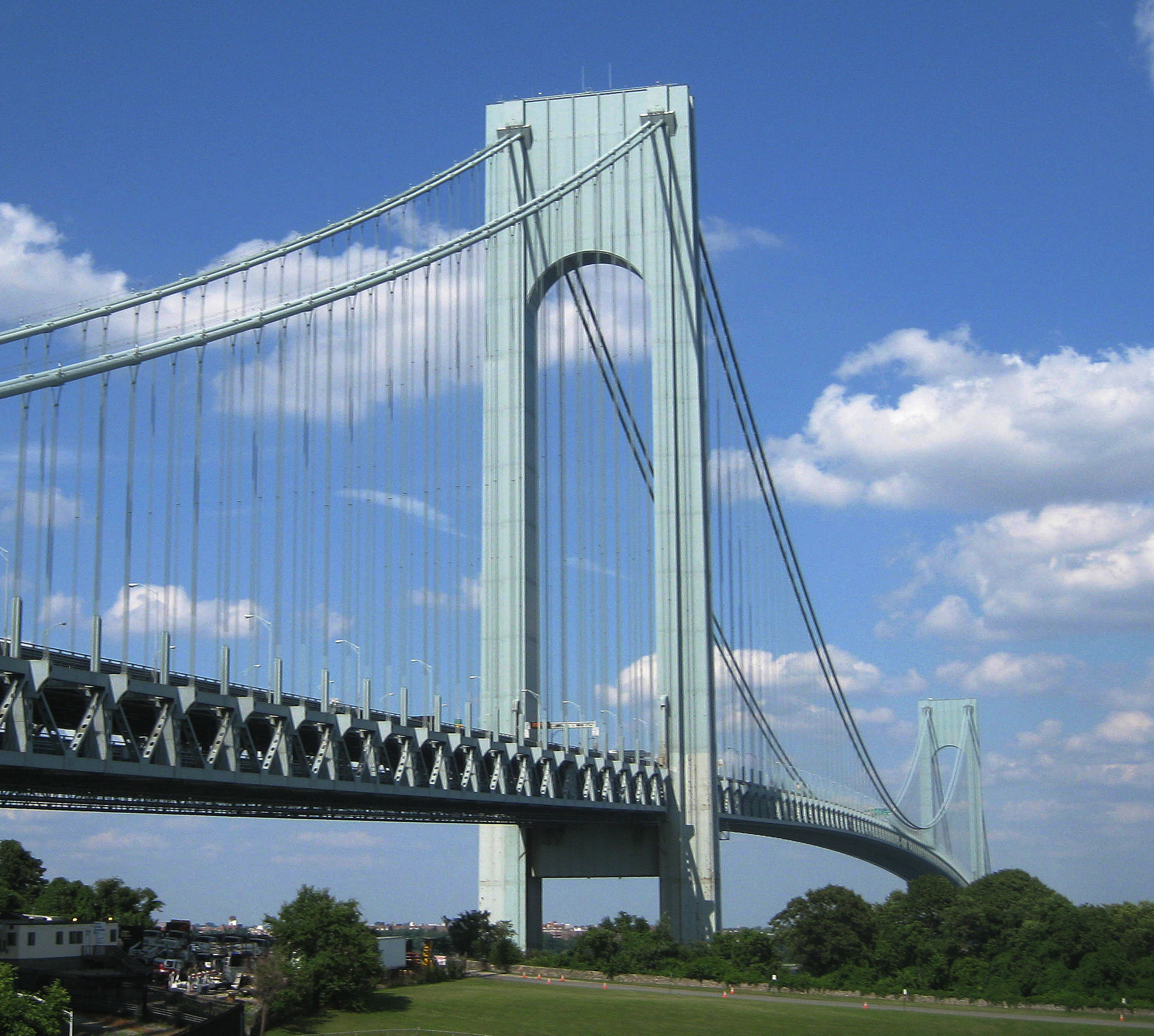
- View from Staten Island towards Brooklyn, 2009
- Coordinates: 40°36′23″N 74°02′44″W
- Carries: 13 lanes (7 upper, 6 lower) of I-278 Toll
- Crosses: The Narrows
- Locale: New York City (Staten Island–Brooklyn), New York, U.S.
- Other name(s): Verrazano–Narrows Bridge; Verrazzano Bridge; Narrows Bridge
- Maintained by: MTA Bridges and Tunnels

Characteristics
- Design: Suspension bridge
- Total length: 13,700 ft (4,176 m)
- Width: 103 ft (31 m)
- Height: 693 ft (211 m)
- Longest span: 4,260 ft (1,298 m)
- Clearance above: 15 ft (4.57 m) (upper level); 14.4 ft (4.39 m) (lower level)
- Clearance below: 228 ft (69.5 m) at mean high water

History
- Designer: Othmar Ammann, Leopold Just and other engineers at Ammann & Whitney
- Construction start: August 13, 1959; 67 years ago
- Opened: November 21, 1964; 62 years ago (upper level); June 28, 1969; 57 years ago (lower level)

Statistics
- Daily traffic: 202,523 (2016)
- Toll: (Both directions) As of January 4, 2026: $7.46 (New York E-ZPass users outside Staten Island); $4.19 (Staten Island residents E-ZPass); $12.03 (Tolls By Mail and non–New York E-ZPass); $9.79 (Mid-Tier NYCSC E-Z Pass)

Location
- Interactive map of Verrazzano–Narrows Bridge

The Verrazzano–Narrows Bridge (/ˌvɛrəˈzɑːnoʊ/ VERR-ə-ZAH-noh; also referred to as the Narrows Bridge, the Verrazzano Bridge, or simply the Verrazzano) is a suspension bridge connecting the boroughs of Staten Island and Brooklyn in New York City, New York, U.S. It spans the Narrows, a body of water linking the relatively enclosed New York Harbor with Lower New York Bay and the Atlantic Ocean. It is the only fixed crossing of the Narrows. The double-deck bridge carries 13 lanes of Interstate 278: seven on the upper level and six on the lower level. The span is named for Giovanni da Verrazzano, who in 1524 was the first European explorer to enter New York Harbor and the Hudson River.

Engineer David B. Steinman proposed a bridge across the Narrows in the late 1920s, but plans were deferred over the next twenty years. A 1920s attempt to build a Staten Island Tunnel was aborted, as was a 1930s plan for vehicular tubes underneath the Narrows. Discussion of a tunnel resurfaced in the mid-1930s and early 1940s, but the plans were again denied. In the late 1940s, urban planner Robert Moses championed a bridge across the Narrows as a way to connect Staten Island with the rest of the city. Various problems delayed the start of construction until 1959. Designed by Othmar Ammann, Leopold Just, and other engineers at Ammann & Whitney, the bridge opened on November 21, 1964. The lower deck opened in 1969 to accommodate increasing traffic loads. The bridge was refurbished in the 1990s and again in the 2010s and 2020s.

The bridge has a central span of 4,260 feet (0.807 miles; 1.30 kilometers). Its central span was the longest of any suspension bridge in the world until the Humber Bridge was completed in 1981. The bridge has the 23rd-longest main span in the world, as well as the longest in the Americas. When the bridge was officially named in 1960, it was misspelled "Verrazano–Narrows Bridge" due to an error in the construction contract, though the name was not corrected until 2018. The Verrazzano–Narrows Bridge collects tolls in both directions. From 1986 to 2020, in an attempt to reduce traffic congestion, only westbound drivers paid a toll (which was double the standard toll for several of the city's other bridges).

== History ==
=== Early plans ===
==== Liberty Bridge ====
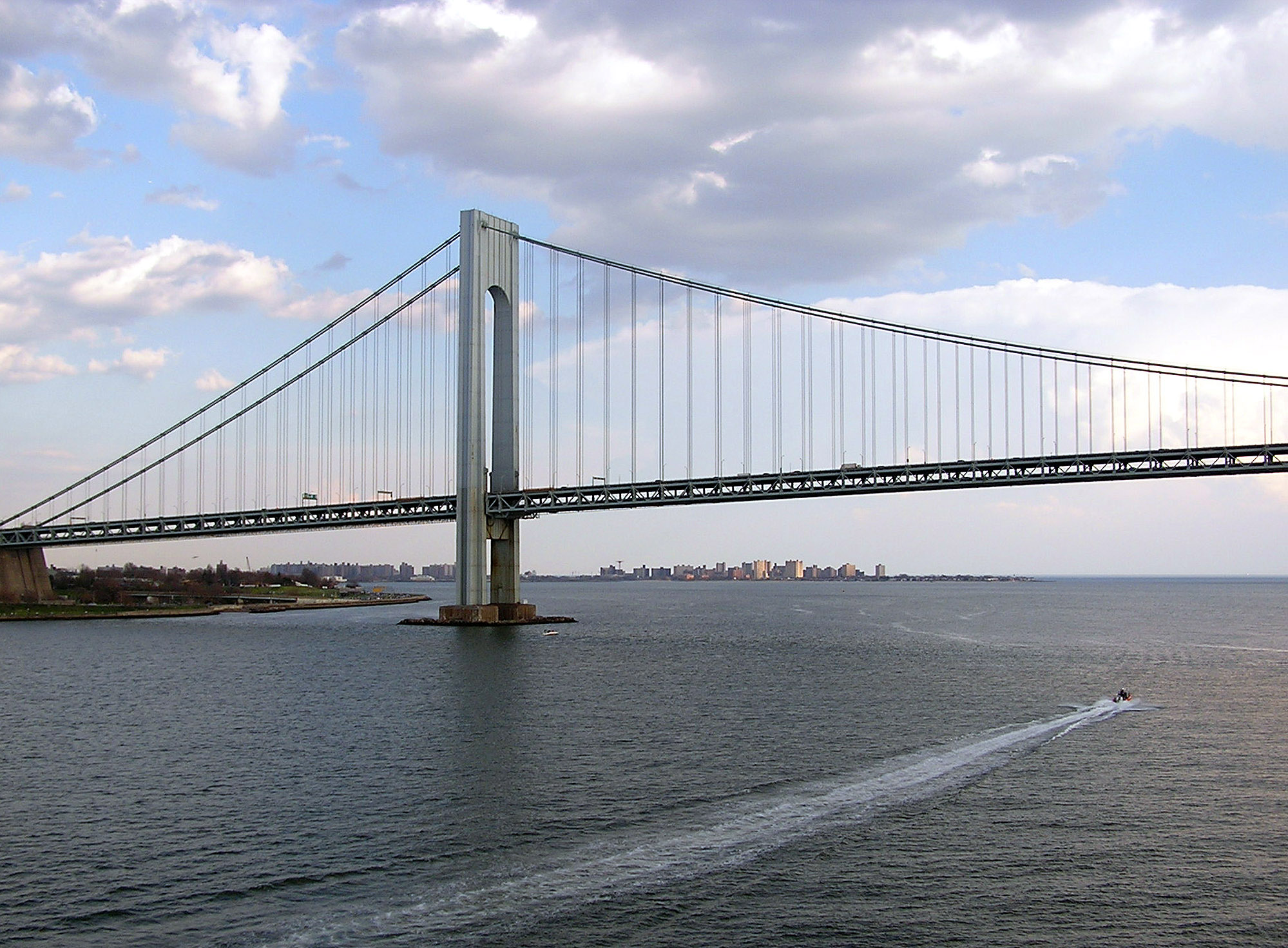
View of the Verrazzano–Narrows Bridge from Upper New York Bay, with Coney Island in the distance

A bridge across the Narrows had been proposed as early as 1926 or 1927, when structural engineer David B. Steinman brought up the possibility of such a crossing. At the time, Staten Island was isolated from the rest of New York City, and its only direct connection to the city's other four boroughs was by the Staten Island Ferry to South Ferry in Manhattan, or by ferries to 39th and 69th Streets in Brooklyn. In 1928, the chambers of commerce in Brooklyn, Queens, Long Island, and Staten Island announced that the Interboro Bridge Company had proposed the future construction of the "Liberty Bridge" to the United States Department of War. The bridge's towers would be 800 feet (240 m) high and it would cost $60 million in 1928 dollars. In November 1929, engineers released plans for the 4,500-foot (1,400 m) Liberty Bridge spanning the Narrows, with 800-foot-tall towers. Supporters hoped that the new construction would spur development on Staten Island, along with the Outerbridge Crossing and the Bayonne Bridge, which were under construction at the time.

The Liberty Bridge would carry vehicles from Bay Ridge, Brooklyn, to an as-yet-undetermined location on Staten Island. On the Brooklyn side, the city planned to connect the Liberty Bridge to a "Crosstown Highway", spanning Brooklyn and Queens and connecting to the proposed Triborough Bridge in northwestern Queens. The city also envisioned a possible connection to the preexisting Manhattan Bridge, connecting Downtown Brooklyn to Lower Manhattan. However, a vote on the planned Liberty Bridge was never taken, as it was blocked by then-Congressman Fiorello H. La Guardia, who believed that a public necessity should not be provided by private interests.

==== 1920s tunnel plan ====
A prior attempt to link Brooklyn and Staten Island, using the Staten Island Tunnel, had commenced in 1923 but was canceled two years later. That tunnel would have extended New York City Subway service from Brooklyn to Staten Island. This proposal was also revived with the announcement of the Liberty Bridge. One of the alternative proposals had the subway tunnel going from St. George, Staten Island, to Bay Ridge, Brooklyn, before continuing to Governors Island and then Lower Manhattan. Simultaneously, engineers proposed a set of vehicular tunnels from Fort Wadsworth, Staten Island, to 97th Street, Brooklyn. The tubes were being planned in conjunction with the Triborough Tunnel (the modern-day Queens Midtown Tunnel), which would connect Manhattan, Brooklyn, and Queens. The city appropriated $5 million for the tunnels in July 1929, and the Baltimore and Ohio Railroad also pledged funding for the vehicular tunnels. Planning for the vehicular tubes started that month.

The Brooklyn Chamber of Commerce simultaneously considered all three projects—the bridge, the vehicular tunnels, and the subway tunnel. Community groups on both sides of the Narrows disagreed on which projects should be built first, if at all. Residents of Bay Ridge opposed any plans involving a bridge because its construction would almost definitely require the demolition of part of the neighborhood. Boring work for the vehicular tunnels started in November 1930. The 11,000-foot (3,400 m) twin tunnels, projected to be completed by 1937, were to connect Hylan Boulevard on Staten Island with 86th Street in Brooklyn once they were completed. In January 1932, construction of these tunnels was put on hold indefinitely due to a lack of money. The construction work did not go beyond an examination of shoreline on the Brooklyn side.

==== Cancellation of bridge ====
In February 1933, the U.S. House of Representatives approved a bill authorizing the construction of a suspension bridge across the Narrows. With this approval, the Interboro Bridge Company hoped to start constructing the bridge by the end of the year, thereby creating jobs for 80,000 workers. Structural engineer Othmar H. Ammann, who was building the Triborough Bridge, Midtown Tunnel, and Golden Gate Bridge at the time, showed interest in designing the proposed Narrows bridge, which would be the world's longest bridge if it were built. The city approved the construction of a rapid transit tunnel under the Narrows in December 1933. This tunnel was approved in conjunction with the proposed Brooklyn–Battery Tunnel connecting Red Hook with Lower Manhattan.

In April 1934, the War Department announced its opposition to the Narrows Bridge's construction. The War Department's opposition to the bridge plan was based on the fact that a bridge could create a blockage during wartime, a rationale it gave for opposing a Brooklyn–Battery Bridge connecting Red Hook, Brooklyn, with Lower Manhattan. The Port Authority of New York and New Jersey did not have a public position regarding the Narrows Bridge plan, other than a request that it be allowed to operate the future bridge. Following the War Department's announcement that they would oppose the Narrows bridge, private interests began studying the feasibility of a tunnel under the Narrows.

==== 1930s tunnel plan ====
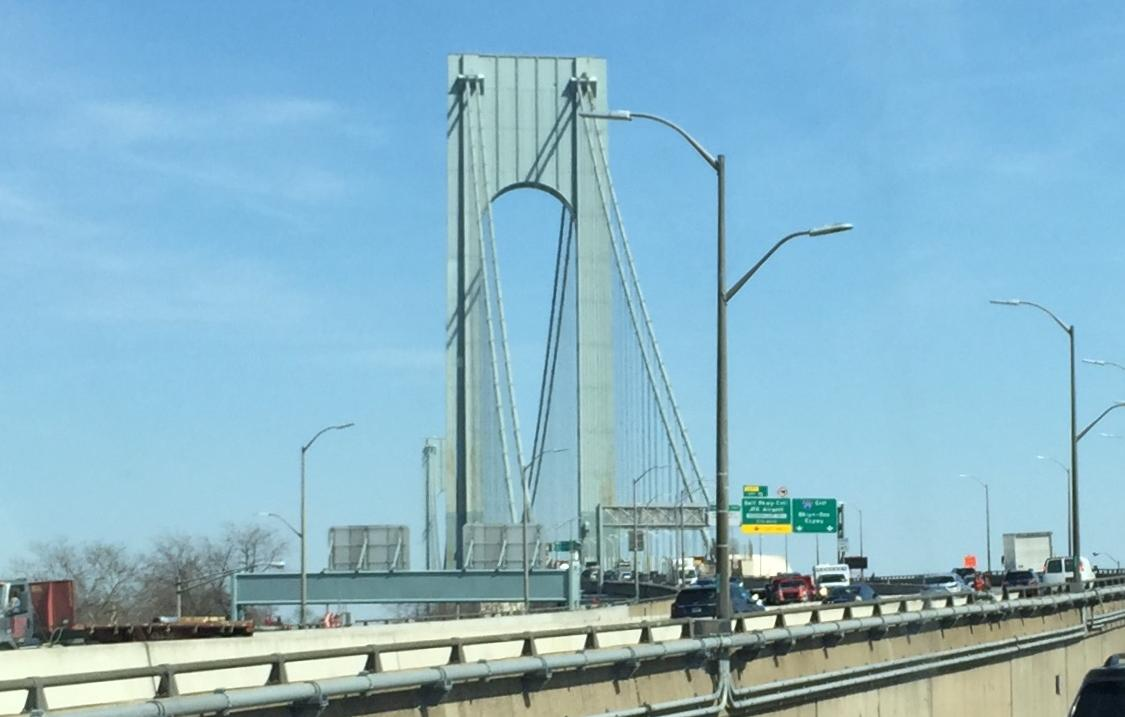
View of the Verrazzano–Narrows Bridge from the Staten Island entrance plaza

In 1936, the plan for a Narrows crossing was brought up again when now-New York City mayor La Guardia gained authorization to petition the U.S. Congress for a bridge across the Narrows. Under the new plan, the proposed bridge would charge tolls for motorists, and its $50 million cost would be paid off using federal bonds. La Guardia preferred a tunnel instead, and so the next year he requested the New York City Tunnel Authority to review the feasibility of such a crossing. The New York City Planning Commission was amenable to constructing either a bridge or a tunnel across the Narrows, and in 1939, put forth a plan to expand New York City's highway system. In March of the same year, as a bill for the Battery Bridge was being passed, Staten Island state legislators added a last-minute amendment to the bill, providing for a Narrows bridge. The Narrows crossing was not included in the final version of the Planning Commission's plan, which was approved in 1941.

In 1943, the New York City Board of Estimate allocated $50,000 toward a feasibility study of the tunnel. By this time, Bay Ridge residents now opposed the tunnel plan as well, because they feared that the tunnel's construction would lower the quality of life in that neighborhood. After the war ended in 1945, the Planning Commission estimated that construction of the Narrows Tunnel would cost $73.5 million. However, by then, La Guardia had turned against the tunnel, saying that "it is not my time" to construct the tunnel.

=== 1940s and 1950s bridge plan ===
==== Initial proposal ====
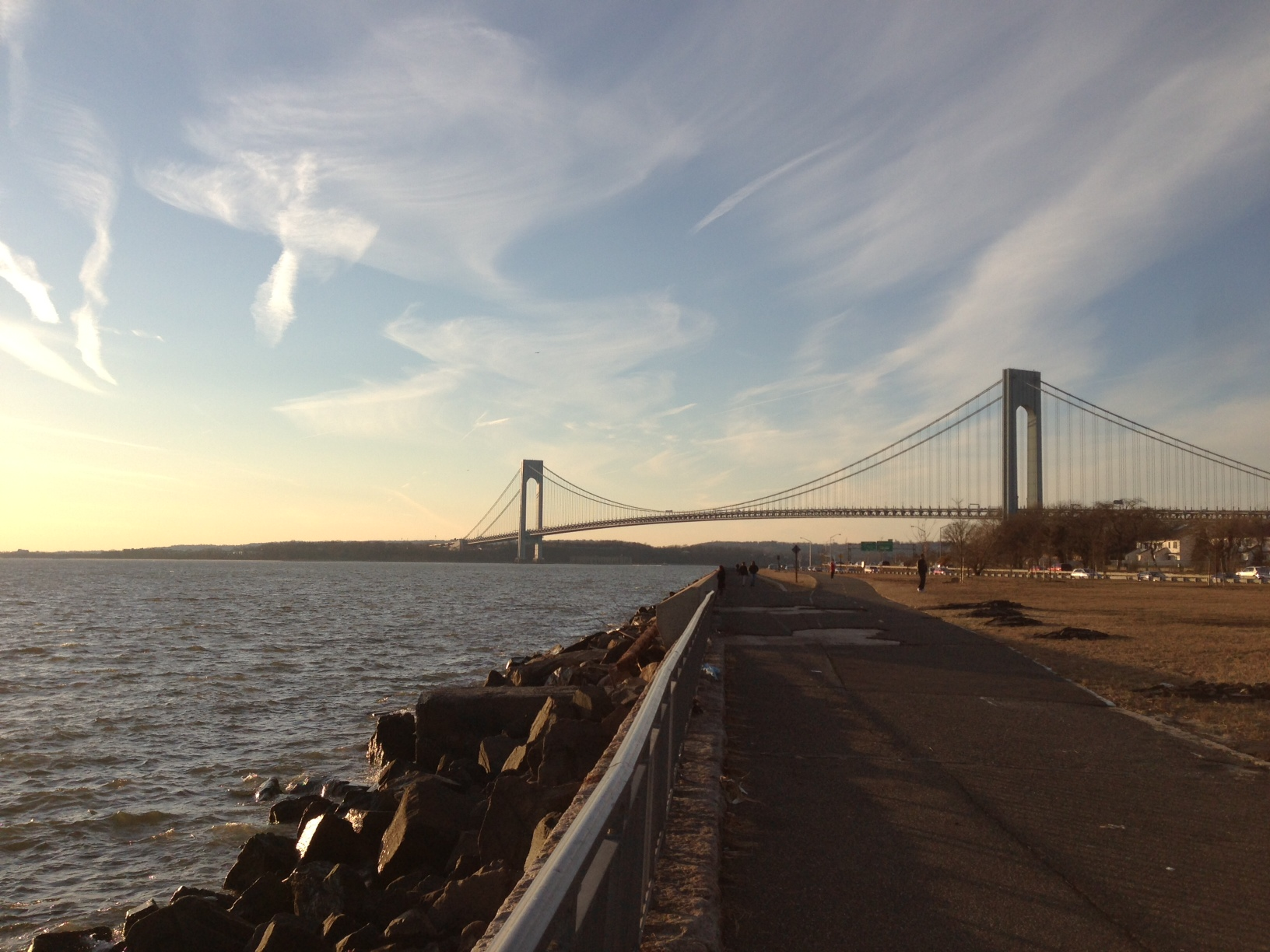
Verrazzano–Narrows Bridge seen from Brooklyn at sunset in December 2012

The cancellation of plans for the Narrows tunnel brought a resurgence of proposals for a bridge across the Narrows. In September 1947, Robert Moses, the chairman of the Triborough Bridge and Tunnel Authority (TBTA), announced that the city was going to ask the War Department for permission to build a bridge across the Narrows. Moses had previously created a feasibility study for a Narrows tunnel, finding that it would be much cheaper to build a bridge. Moses and mayor William O'Dwyer both supported the Narrows Bridge plan, which was still being referred to as "Liberty Bridge". The city submitted its request to the War Department in July 1948, and a commission composed of three United States Armed Forces branches was convened to solicit the public's opinions on the proposed span.

U.S. Representative Donald Lawrence O'Toole, whose constituency included Bay Ridge, opposed the proposal for the bridge because he believed it would damage the character of Bay Ridge, and because the bridge might block the Narrows in case of a war. He cited a poll showing that for every Bay Ridge resident who supported the bridge's construction, 33 more were opposed. The U.S. military approved the bridge proposal in May 1949, over the vociferous opposition of Bay Ridge residents, on the condition that construction start within five years. By that time, plans for the 6,540-foot (1,990 m) span had been finalized, and the project only needed $78 million in financing in order to proceed. This financing was not set to be awarded until 1950, when the Battery Tunnel was completed. Preliminary plans showed the bridge as being 237 ft (72 m) above the mean high water level, enough for the 215-foot (66 m) RMS Queen Mary to pass under it.

Moses and acting Port Authority Chairman Bayard F. Pope were agreeable to letting either of their respective agencies construct and operate the proposed Narrows Bridge, as long as that agency could do so efficiently. In 1954, the two agencies started conducting a joint study on the logistics of building and constructing the bridge. Because of restrictions by the TBTA's bondholders, construction could not begin until at least 1957. Frederick H. Zurmuhlen, the Commissioner of Public Works, estimated that the Narrows Bridge would cost $200 million total. He encouraged the TBTA to start construction on the bridge as soon as possible in order to reduce congestion on East River crossings to the north. Staten Islanders viewed the project cautiously, since the Narrows Bridge would provide a connection to the rest of the city, but could also cause traffic congestion through the borough. Moses had only a positive view of the bridge's proposed effects on Staten Islanders, saying that it was vital for the borough's future.

In May 1954, the Army's permit for starting construction on the Narrows Bridge lapsed. The Army granted a two-year extension for the start of construction. In a measure passed in March 1955, the city gained control over the approval process for several tasks related to the Narrows bridge's construction, including land acquisition. A little more than a month later, New York governor W. Averell Harriman signed a $600 million spending bill authorizing the construction of the Narrows Bridge; the construction of the Throgs Neck Bridge between Queens and the Bronx; and the addition of a second level to the George Washington Bridge between Manhattan and New Jersey. Later that year, it was announced that the Narrows Bridge would be part of an expansion to the Interstate Highway System. Although a study on the viability of adding transit service to the Narrows Bridge was commissioned in early 1956, Moses rejected the idea of adding subway tracks onto the new bridge, saying that it would be too costly. In April of that year, New Jersey governor Robert B. Meyner signed a bill that allowed the Port Authority to build the Narrows Bridge and lease it to the TBTA, who would operate the bridge. The TBTA would buy the bridge from the Port Authority in 1967 as part of the agreement.

==== Finalization of plans ====
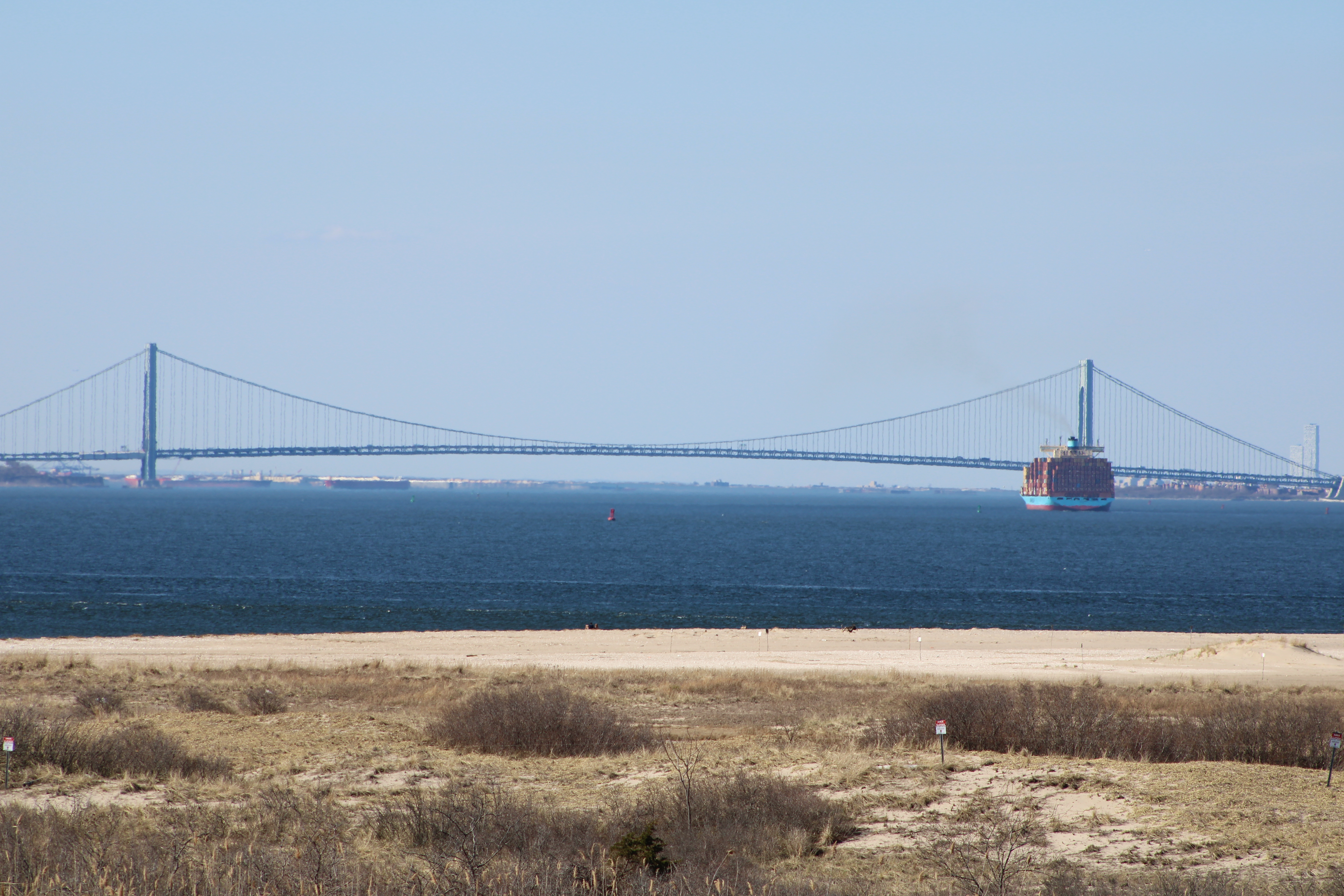
A container ship heading toward the Verrazzano–Narrows Bridge seen from Sandy Hook, New Jersey

On the Brooklyn side, the Narrows Bridge was originally supposed to connect to the Circumferential (Belt) Parkway, but in early 1957, Harriman vetoed a bill that stipulated that the main approach connect to the Belt Parkway. By May 1957, an updated location for the Brooklyn anchorage had been agreed on. The anchorage was now to be located at Fort Lafayette, an island coastal fortification built next to Fort Hamilton at the southern tip of Bay Ridge. Moses also proposed expanding Brooklyn's Gowanus Expressway and extending it to the Narrows Bridge by way of Seventh Avenue, which would require cutting through the middle of Bay Ridge. This proposal drew opposition from the community, who wanted the approach to follow the Belt Parkway along the Brooklyn shore. These opponents said that the Seventh Avenue alignment would displace over 1,500 families. In February 1958, the New York State Legislature approved a bill to change the Brooklyn approaches back to Belt Parkway, which was almost identical to the bill Harriman had vetoed. However, the city approved the Seventh Avenue bridge approach in August 1958. The next month, mayor Robert F. Wagner Jr. said that the city was committed to building a bridge across the Narrows, but was not committed to the construction of the Seventh Avenue approach. In response, Moses wrote to Wagner that any continuing delays would cause the bridge to be canceled. The bridge's cost had now risen to $320 million.

After holding a hearing for concerned Bay Ridge residents, the Board of Estimate affirmed the Narrows Bridge plan in October 1958, without any objections. At the same time, it rejected plans for a tunnel under the Narrows, as well as a bridge or tunnel from Brooklyn directly to Jersey City, New Jersey. The Board was set to vote on the Seventh Avenue approach in mid-December, but the federal government stated that it would only agree to the bridge's construction if the Seventh Avenue approach had 12 lanes, with six on each level. The federal government was already paying for two highway improvements on both sides of the proposed bridge: the Clove Lakes Expressway (Staten Island Expressway) on Staten Island, and the Gowanus Expressway in Brooklyn. On December 31 of that year, the Board of Estimate voted to approve plans for the Seventh Avenue approach, having delayed that vote several times.

The approval of the Seventh Avenue approach angered Bay Ridge residents since the construction of the approach would displace 7,500 people. Opposition in Staten Island was far smaller. More than twice as many people were being displaced there, but Staten Island stood to benefit from a better connection to the rest of the city. Thus, the bridge's announcement was welcomed and it sparked a rise in real-estate prices on the island. As the controversy progressed, Steinman brought up a competing proposal to build a bridge between Brooklyn and New Jersey directly. Nelson Rockefeller, the Republican candidate for governor of New York, initially supported Steinman's proposal to build a bridge to New Jersey, but Moses later persuaded Rockefeller to endorse the bridge to Staten Island.

The State Legislature drafted a bill in an effort to change the Brooklyn approach's location to Belt Parkway. However, now-governor Rockefeller vetoed the Belt Parkway bill, and in March 1959, the Board of Estimate officially condemned land along Seventh Avenue to make way for the Gowanus Expressway extension to the Narrows Bridge. The only tasks remaining before the start of construction were to finalize the design of the Narrows Bridge, and to speed up the construction schedule to meet a 1964 deadline. In April 1959, the bridge was officially renamed after the Italian navigator Giovanni da Verrazzano. This sparked a controversy because the proposed bridge's name only had one "z" while the explorer's name had two "z"s.

=== Construction ===
==== Preparation ====
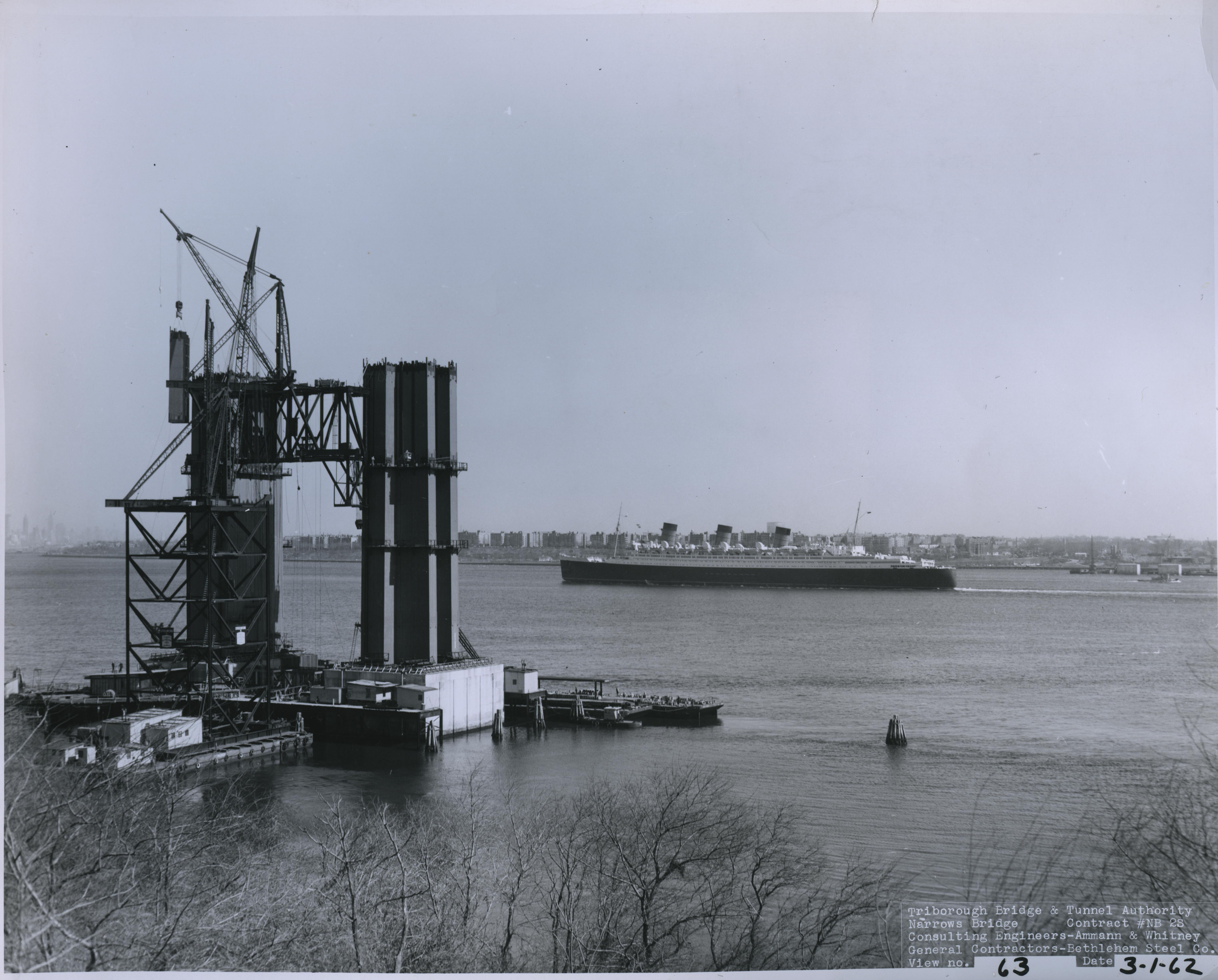
Construction of the suspension towers with the ocean liner RMS Queen Mary transiting The Narrows in background in 1962

Surveying work for the Verrazano-Narrows Bridge began in January 1959. Construction officially began on August 14, 1959, with a groundbreaking ceremony on the Staten Island anchorage. Those in attendance included New Jersey governor Meyner, New York City mayor Wagner, and TBTA chairman Moses. Although Rockefeller had been invited to the event, neither he nor Assembly speaker Joseph F. Carlino showed up. In December 1959, the TBTA was put in charge of funding and building the bridge. To raise money for construction, Rockefeller signed a bill that would remove the 4% ceiling on the interest rates for the securities that the TBTA was selling to pay for the bridge. This ceiling would be lifted until June 1965. In essence, this meant that the TBTA could sell securities at much higher interest rates to raise the $320 million that was needed.

Othmar Ammann was named as the senior partner for the project. Other notable figures involved chief engineer Milton Brumer; project engineers Herb Rothman and Frank L. Stahl; design engineer Leopold Just; Safety Engineer Alonzo Dickinson, and engineer of construction John West Kinney. Meanwhile, John "Hard Nose" Murphy supervised the span's and cables' construction.

Before starting actual work on the bridge, the TBTA destroyed the structures at the future locations of the anchorages. The agency acquired 36 acres (15 ha) of the 138 acres (56 ha) within Fort Hamilton, in return for paying for a $12 million renovation of the Army installation and giving up 10.8 acres (4.4 ha) of land in Dyker Beach Park. A 1,000-ton World War I monument on the Brooklyn side, within the path of the future Seventh Avenue approach, was placed atop rolling logs and shifted 370 ft (110 m). The right-of-way for the Seventh Avenue approach was also being cleared, and despite initial opposition to the clearing work, all of the residents within the approach's path eventually acquiesced to moving elsewhere. To prevent contractors from delaying work on the expressways on either side of the bridge, Moses warned them of steep fines if the expressways were not completed by the time the bridge was finished.

==== Progress ====
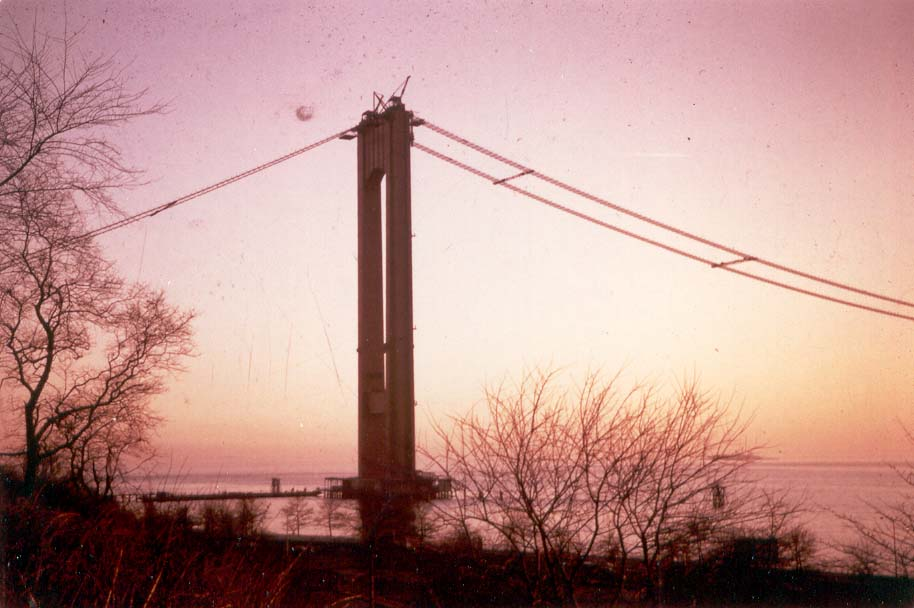
The bridge's tower and cables during its construction

An anchorage was built on each side of the Narrows, with each anchorage measuring 229 ft (70 m) long by 129 ft (39 m) wide, and containing a combined 780,000 short tons (700,000 long tons) of steel and concrete. Each anchorage contained sixty-six large holes for the cables. The bases of each anchorage are built on glacial sands, reaching 52 feet (16 m) below ground level on the Brooklyn side, and 76 feet (23 m) below ground level on the Staten Island side. Foundation work for the Verrazano-Narrows Bridge was well underway by 1960, as visitors were able to see the anchorages. A concrete workers' strike in mid-1961 threatened the timely completion of the Staten Island anchorage, which had only been partially filled with concrete. This strike lasted several months and affected many projects under the city.

As construction on the anchorages proceeded, two watertight caissons were sunk into the channel close to either shoreline, so that the bridge's suspension towers could be built atop each caisson. The bases of each caisson consisted of sixty-six circular openings each 17 feet (5.2 m) in diameter, arranged in a six-by-eleven grid. Shafts of reinforced concrete would be built along the inner rim of each opening, and once each section of shaft reached 40 feet (12 m) above water level, cranes with clamshell buckets would dig the sand and mud inside each shaft before sinking the shafts deeper into the water. The Staten Island side's caisson was sunk 105 ft (32 m) into the water, and necessitated the dredging of 81,000 cubic yards (62,000 m^{3}) of sand and assorted muck. This caisson required 47,000 yd^{3} (36,000 m^{3}) of concrete, and in March 1961, it became the first of the two caissons to be sunk. The Brooklyn side's caisson required even more work, since it was 170 ft (52 m) deep, displaced 145,000 yd^{3} (111,000 m^{3}) of muck, and used 83,000 yd^{3} (63,000 m^{3}) of concrete. Once the caissons were sunk completely, the shafts inside each caisson were filled with water, and the bases of the caissons were covered by a sheet of reinforced concrete. The process of constructing the anchorages and caissons took just over two years, and it was complete by the end of 1961.

Two separate companies later constructed the modules that would make up the 693-foot-tall (211 m) suspension towers. The Staten Island tower was built by Bethlehem Steel, and the Brooklyn tower was built by the Harris Structural Company. The first piece of the towers, a 300-foot piece of the tower on the Staten Island side, was lifted into place in October 1961, and this tower was topped out by September 1962. The Brooklyn tower started construction in April 1962. When the towers were fully erected, workers began the process of spinning the bridge's cables. The American Bridge Company was selected to construct the cables and deck. The cable-spinning process began in March 1963, and took six months, since 142,520 mi (229,360 km) of bridge cables had to be strung 104,432 times around the bridge. The main cables were hung on both sides of the span, and then suspender cables were hung from the bridge's main cables. The main cables were fully spun by August.

In late 1963, builders started receiving the rectangular pieces that would make up the roadway deck. The components for the sixty 40-ton slabs were first created in an assembly line in Jersey City. Then, these components were combined in a Bayonne steelworks 5 mi (8 km) from the bridge site, and after the pieces of each slab were assembled, they were floated to the Narrows via barge. Each piece measured 28 ft (8.5 m) high by approximately 115 ft (35 m) wide and long. These pieces of the deck were then hung from the suspender cables. The first piece of the deck was lifted onto the bridge in October 1963. By early 1964, the span was nearly finished, and all that remained was to secure the various parts of the bridge. By this point, plans for new development on Staten Island were well underway, and tourists had come to observe the construction of the Verrazano-Narrows Bridge. The bridge had been scheduled to open in 1965, but as a result of the faster-than-anticipated rate of progress, the TBTA decided to open the bridge in November 1964. In preparation for the Verrazano-Narrows Bridge's opening, the TBTA fully repainted the structure. The construction process of the bridge had employed an average of 1,200 workers a day for five years, excluding those who had worked on the approaches; around 10,000 individuals had worked on the bridge throughout that five-year period.

Three men died during the construction of the bridge. The first fatality was 58-year-old Paul Bassett, who fell off the deck and struck a tower in August 1962. Irving Rubin, also 58 years old, died in July 1963, when he fell off of the bridge approach. The third worker who died was 19-year-old Gerard McKee, who fell into the water in October 1963, after slipping off the catwalk. After McKee's death, workers participated in a five-day strike in December 1963. The strike resulted in temporary safety nets being installed underneath the deck. These nets had not been provided during the four years prior to the strike.

The construction of the bridge was chronicled by the writer Gay Talese in his 1964 book The Bridge: The Building of the Verrazano-Narrows Bridge. He also wrote several articles about the bridge's construction for The New York Times. The book also contains several drawings by Lili Réthi and photographs by Bruce Davidson.

=== Opening ===
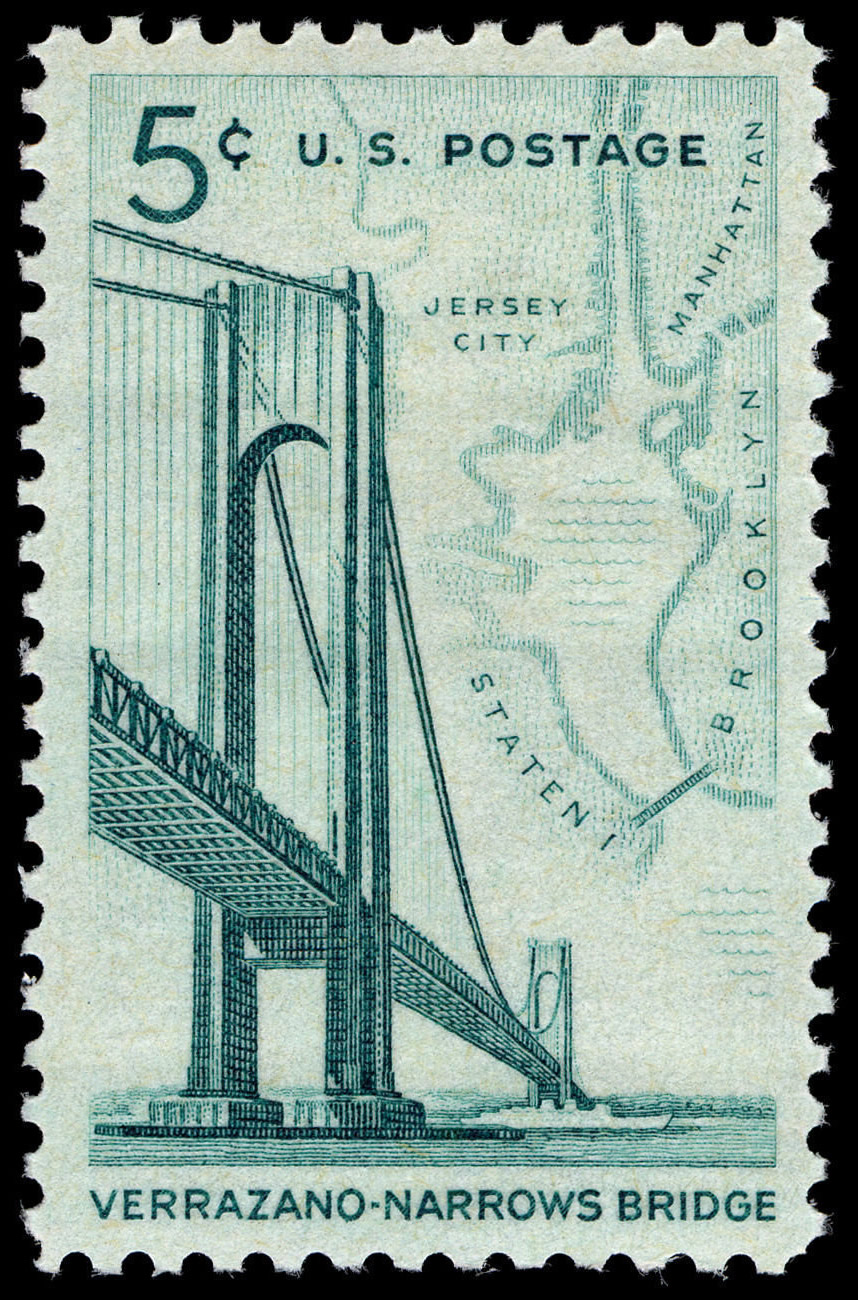
Verrazano-Narrows Bridge commemorative stamp, first sold on November 21, 1964, in conjunction with the bridge's opening

The Staten Island approach to the Verrazano-Narrows Bridge was the first part of the new project to be completed, and it opened in January 1964. The upper deck was opened on November 21, 1964, at a cost of $320 million (equivalent to $3.322 billion in present dollars). Politicians at all levels of the government, from Brooklyn Borough President Abe Stark to U.S. President Lyndon B. Johnson, wrote speeches paying tribute to the Verrazano-Narrows Bridge. The opening ceremony was attended by over 5,000 people, including 1,500 official guests. Several dignitaries, involving the mayor, the governor, and the borough presidents of Brooklyn and Staten Island, cut the gold ribbon. They then joined a motorcade to mark the official opening of the bridge. A 50-cent toll was charged to all motorists crossing the bridge. The Verrazano Bridge's opening was celebrated across Staten Island. Moses did not invite any of the 12,000 workers to the opening, so they boycotted the event and instead attended a Mass in memory of the three workers who died during construction.

The opening was accompanied by the release of a commemorative postage stamp, which depicted a ship sailing underneath the new span. The Metropolitan Transportation Authority (MTA) created a bus route across the bridge to connect Victory Boulevard in Staten Island with the Bay Ridge–95th Street subway station in Brooklyn. This bus service initially saw low patronage, with only 6,000 daily passengers using the route. Five days after the Verrazano-Narrows Bridge opened, the ferry from Staten Island to Bay Ridge, Brooklyn, stopped running, as it was now redundant with the new bridge.

Within the first two months of the bridge's opening, 1.86 million vehicles had used the new crossing, 10% more than originally projected, and this netted the TBTA almost $1 million in toll revenue. The Goethals Bridge, which connected New Jersey to the Staten Island Expressway and the Verrazano Bridge, saw its daily average use increase by 75%, or approximately 300,000 trips total, compared to before the Narrows Bridge opened. The Holland Tunnel from New Jersey to Manhattan, and the Staten Island Ferry from Staten Island to Manhattan, both saw decreased vehicle counts after the bridge opened. In summer 1965, Staten Island saw increased patronage at its beaches, facilitated by the opening of the new bridge. By the time of the bridge's first anniversary, 17 million motorists had crossed the Verrazano-Narrows Bridge, paying $9 million in tolls. The bridge had seen 34% more trips than planners had projected. Conversely, 5.5 million fewer passengers and 700,000 fewer vehicles rode the Staten Island Ferry to Manhattan.

The Verrazano Bridge was the last project designed by Ammann, who had designed many of the other major crossings into and within New York City. He died in 1965, the year after the bridge opened. The Verrazano-Narrows Bridge was also the last great public works project in New York City overseen by Moses. The urban planner envisioned that the Verrazano and Throgs Neck Bridges would be the final major bridges in New York City for the time being, since they would complete the city's expressway system.

=== Late 1960s to 2000s ===
Although the bridge was constructed with only one six-lane roadway, Ammann had provided extra trusses to support a potential second roadway underneath the main deck. These trusses, which were used to strengthen the bridge, were a design alteration that was added to many bridges in the aftermath of the Tacoma Narrows Bridge collapse in 1940. The Verrazzano–Narrows Bridge became so popular among motorists that in March 1969, the TBTA decided to erect the lower deck at a cost of $22 million. The Verrazzano Bridge had not been expected to carry enough traffic to necessitate a second deck until 1978, but traffic patterns over the previous five years had demonstrated the need for extra capacity. By contrast, a lower deck on the George Washington Bridge, connecting New Jersey and Upper Manhattan, had not been built until 31 years after the bridge's 1931 opening. The new six-lane deck opened on June 28, 1969. Originally, the Verrazzano Bridge's Brooklyn end was also supposed to connect to the planned Cross-Brooklyn Expressway, New York State Route 878, and JFK Airport, but the Cross-Brooklyn Expressway project was canceled in 1969.

On June 26, 1976, to celebrate the United States' 200th anniversary, workers placed a very large U.S. flag on the side of the Verrazzano Bridge. The flag, which measured 193 by 366 ft (59 by 112 m), was described in The New York Times as being the size of "a football field and a half" and billed as the world's largest flag. At the time, it was the largest U.S. flag ever made. The flag was supposed to withstand wind speeds of 30 miles per hour (48 km/h), but it ripped apart three days later, when there was a wind speed of 16 mph (26 km/h). The flag had been stuck against the bridge's suspender cables, so any slight wind would have caused the cables to make tears in the flag. A second flag was created in 1980 for the July 4 celebration that year. This flag was even larger at 411 by 210 ft (125 by 64 m) (an area of 71,000 ft^{2} (6,600 m^{2})). The new flag was placed along a steel grid so that the suspender cables would not rip it apart. Architectural critic Ada Louise Huxtable derided the new flag as a "simple-minded, vainglorious proposal" and asked, "Does anyone really want to spend $850,000 to upstage the Statue of Liberty?"

The TBTA stopped collecting tolls for Brooklyn-bound drivers on the Verrazzano Bridge in 1986 and doubled the toll for Staten Island-bound drivers. This was a result of a bill introduced by Guy V. Molinari, the U.S. representative for Staten Island, as part of an initiative to reduce traffic that accumulated at the toll booth on Staten Island. The one-way toll was initially intended to be part of a six-month pilot program, but resulted in permanent changes to traffic flows on the Verrazzano Bridge. The crossing saw more Brooklyn-bound traffic and less Staten Island-bound traffic as a result. This unidirectional collection remained in effect through 2020, when two-way tolls were restored.

The TBTA spent $45 million in the 1990s on repairs to the deck, which had been damaged by chloride from the seawater. As part of the project, the top 3 inches (76 mm) of the deck was removed and latex-modified concrete poured in its place. The TBTA also allocated $30 million to repaint the bridge and approaches gray; this project began in 1998. Workers also repaired the bridge's anchorages and replaced the roadways atop the anchorages. The repairs to the anchorages and electrical systems were completed in 2002, and workers finished repainting the bridge the next year. In addition, a minor project to clean and repaint both of the decks (mostly the bottom deck) took place between 2004 and 2008. Beginning in 2008, all 262 of the mercury vapor fixtures in the bridge's necklace lighting were replaced with energy-efficient light-emitting diodes. This retrofit was completed in 2009, years before LED street lights were installed in the rest of the city.

The Verrazzano–Narrows Bridge's name was originally spelled with one "z". The "Verrazano" name dates to 1960 when Governor Rockefeller had signed the bill authorizing the bridge's name as such. A bill to formally change the bridge's name to the variant with two "z"s was introduced by college student Robert Nash in 2016, but it stalled in early 2018. The New York State Senate voted to change the name of the bridge in June 2018, and the name change was officially signed into law that October.

=== 2010s to present ===
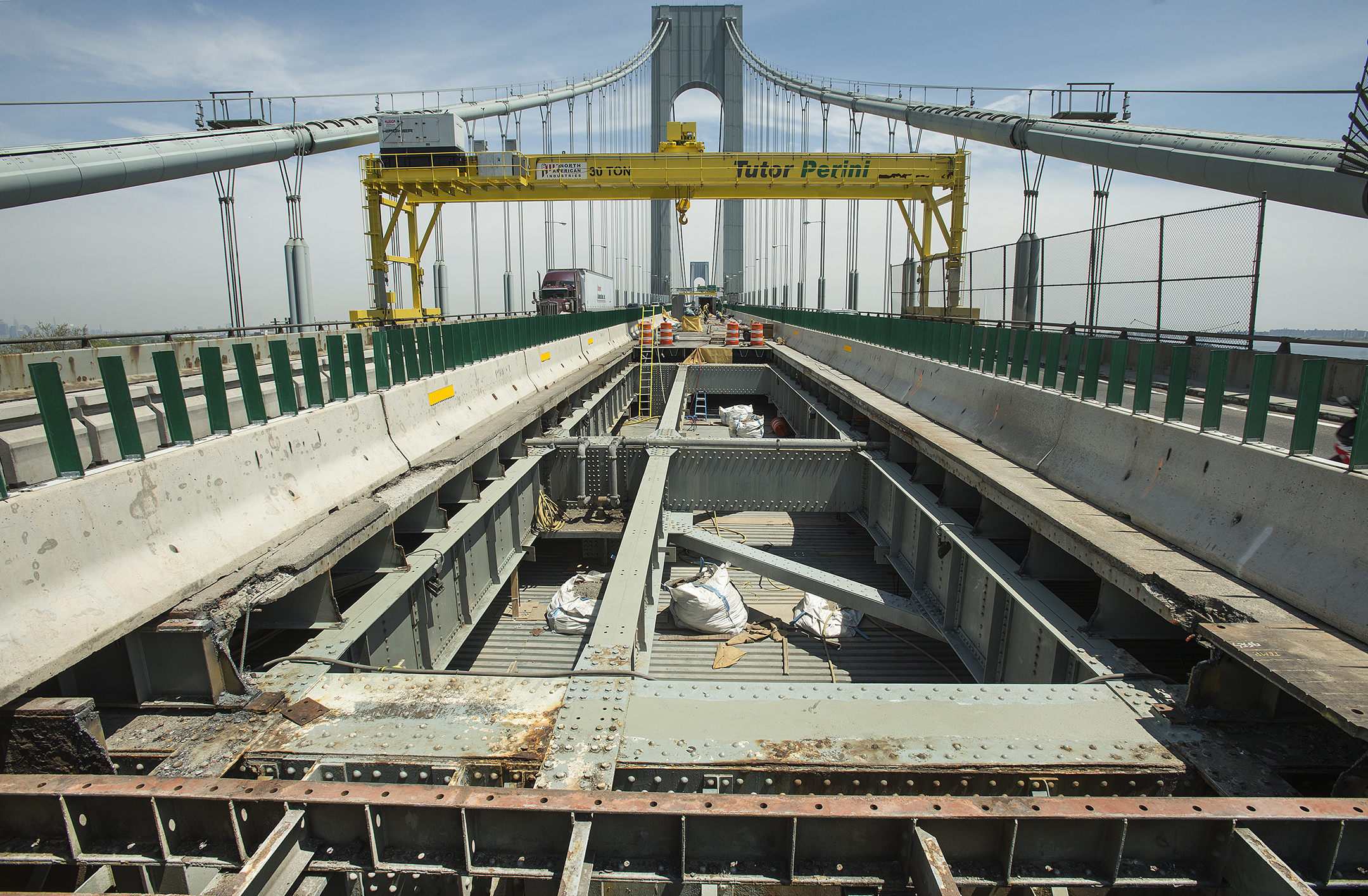
The rebuilding of the upper deck's median in 2015

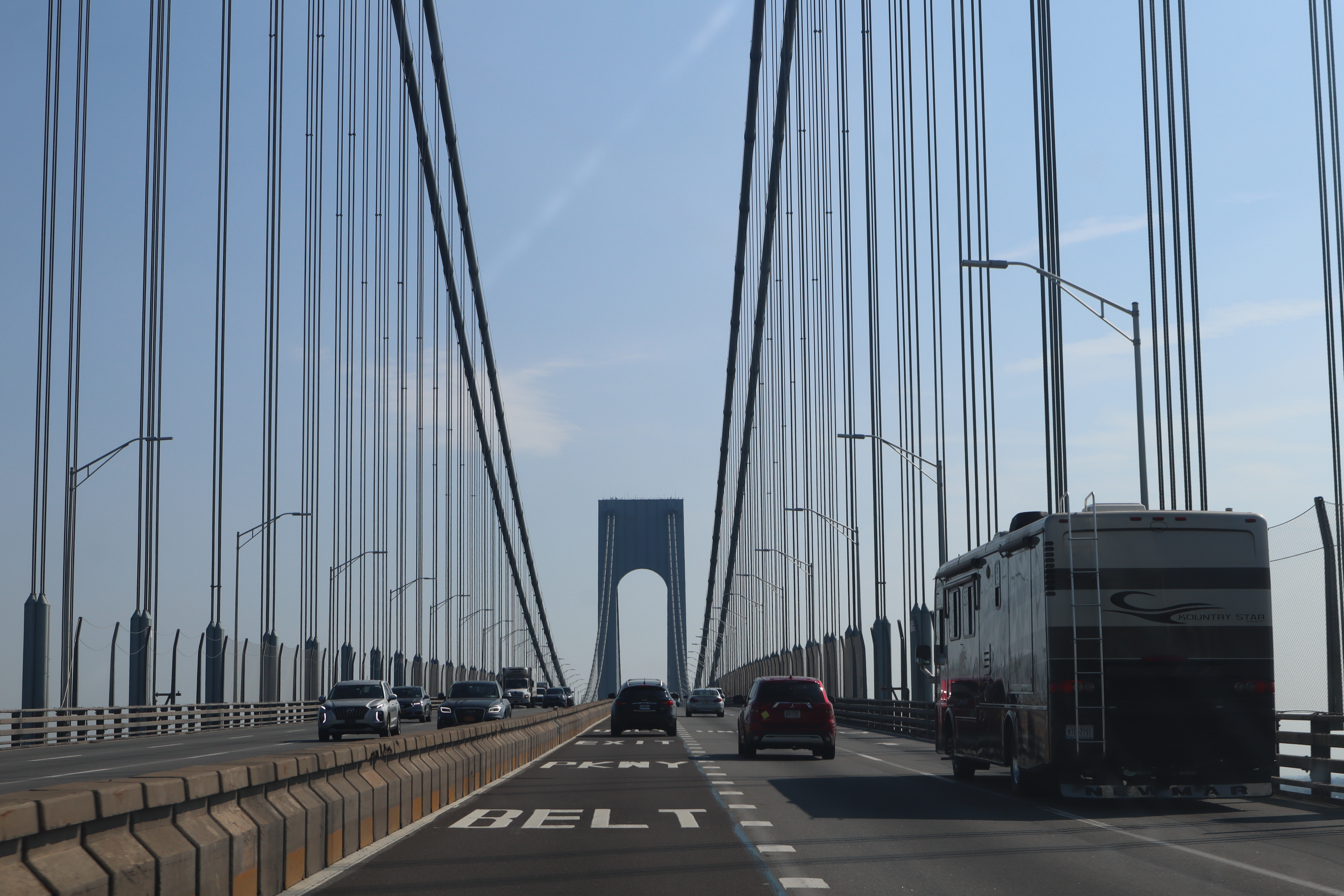
The upper deck in 2022

In 2011, the city began a $1.5 billion renovation of the bridge. At the time, it was expected to take up to 25 years. The first phase, which cost $235 million and lasted until 2017, involved constructing a seventh lane on the upper deck, which was to be used as a high-occupancy vehicle (HOV) lane. The old median barrier was demolished, and the old deck was replaced with orthotropic decking. Related work also included the repainting the bridge's supports with corrosion-resistant paint. The ramps within the Belt Parkway interchange were also rearranged to allow for a ramp to be constructed for the new HOV lane on the upper deck. The parts for this deck were ordered from China because the parts that the MTA required were no longer manufactured in the United States. After the upper deck was replaced, parts of the lower deck are to be replaced, but this necessitates the closure of the lower deck during construction. Hence, the MTA opted to replace the upper deck first to add more capacity. The upper level's new HOV lane opened on June 22, 2017.

The MTA dismantled the Staten Island-bound toll booths in 2017 to speed up westbound traffic. This work was done in advance of the reconstruction of tracks around Penn Station, which severely limited rail service into that station and created more vehicular traffic at crossings to Manhattan. The MTA accelerated some components of the Verrazzano–Narrows Bridge's reconstruction during the COVID-19 pandemic in New York City in 2020, rebuilding the westbound approach ramp from the Gowanus Expressway and adding a fourth lane along that ramp. This also allowed for an extensive renovation of the towers' pedestals. Long-term plans also call for the installation of a bicycle and pedestrian path on the Verrazzano–Narrows Bridge.

The March 2024 collapse of Baltimore's Key Bridge raised awareness and concern about other bridges nationwide, especially with ship traffic being diverted to other area ports. A few weeks after the Baltimore bridge collapse, a large container ship had propulsion problems near the Verrazzano in early April and was assisted by several tugboats. The National Transportation Safety Board recommended in early 2025 that the bridge undergo a structural vulnerability assessment as a result of the Key Bridge collapse. That June, the MTA's capital committee indicated that the agency planned to replace the main cables for $249 million, and it awarded a contract for the cable replacement to the company Skanska Koch.

== Description ==
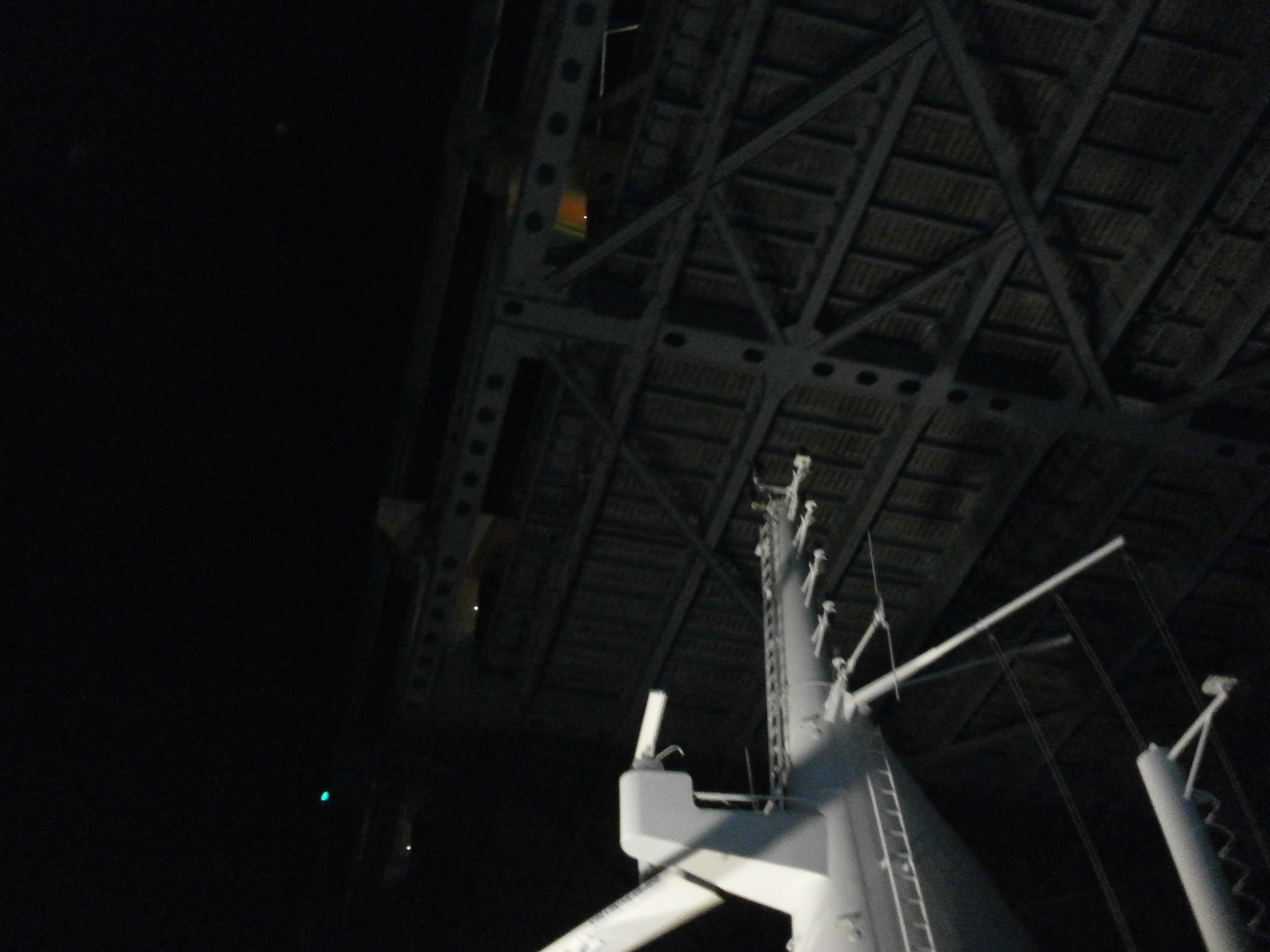
Queen Mary 2 radar mast passing under the Verrazzano Bridge, showing that there is sufficient clearance for the ship beneath the span

The Verrazzano–Narrows Bridge is owned by Triborough Bridge and Tunnel Authority bondholders who paid for the bridge at its construction. It is operated by the TBTA, which is an affiliate agency of the MTA, using the business name MTA Bridges and Tunnels. The bridge carries Interstate 278, which continues onto the Staten Island Expressway to the west and the Gowanus Expressway to the northeast. The Verrazzano, in combination with the Goethals Bridge and the Staten Island Expressway, created a new way for commuters and travelers to reach Brooklyn, Long Island, and Manhattan by car from New Jersey.

=== Deck ===
At the time of opening, the Verrazzano–Narrows Bridge was the longest suspension bridge in the world; its 4,260-foot center span, between the two suspension towers, was 60 feet (18 m) longer than the Golden Gate Bridge's center span. Despite being only slightly longer than the Golden Gate Bridge, the Verrazzano–Narrows Bridge could carry a 75% greater load than the former could. In 1981, the Verrazzano Bridge was surpassed by the Humber Bridge in England, which has a center span of 4,626 ft (1,410 m), as the world's longest suspension bridge.

The upper and lower levels are supported by trusses underneath each roadway, which stiffen the bridge against vertical, torsional, and lateral pressure. There are also lateral trusses on either side of the lower level. The anchorage on the Staten Island side contains a facility for heating cinders that are used to de-ice the bridge deck during winter.

Because of thermal expansion of the steel cables, the height of the upper roadway is 12 feet (3.66 m) lower in summer than in winter. The Narrows is the only entry point for large cruise ships and container ships that dock in New York City. As a result, they must be built to accommodate the clearance under the bridge. At mean high water, that clearance is 228 ft (69 m). The RMS Queen Mary 2, one such vessel built to Verrazzano–Narrows Bridge specifications, was designed with a flatter funnel to pass under the bridge, and has 13 ft (3.96 m) of clearance under the bridge during high tide.

=== Towers and cables ===
Each of the two suspension towers contains around 1 million bolts and 3 million rivets. The towers contain a combined 1,265,000 short tons (1,129,000 long tons) of metal, more than three times the 365,000 short tons (326,000 long tons) of metal used in the Empire State Building. Because of the height of the towers (693 ft or 211 m) and their distance from each other (4,260 ft or 1,298 m), the curvature of the Earth's surface had to be taken into account when designing the bridge. The towers are not parallel to each other, but are 1 5/8 in (41.275 mm) farther apart at their tops than at their bases. When built, the bridge's suspension towers were the tallest structures in New York City outside of Manhattan. The towers do not use cross-bracing, unlike similar suspension bridges; instead, there are arched struts near the top of each tower and below the lower deck. At the base of each tower is a concrete-and-granite pedestal, which rests on a caisson measuring 129 by 229 feet (39 by 70 m) across.

The western tower is 300 feet (91 m) offshore from Staten Island, while the eastern tower is 700 feet (210 m) offshore from Brooklyn. The Verrazzano–Narrows Bridge is classified as a fracture critical bridge, making it vulnerable to collapse if parts of the offshore towers were to fail. According to MTA officials, piles of rocks (known as riprap) around the towers' bases would ground a stray ship before it could hit a tower. The diameter of each of the four main suspension cables is 36 in (914 mm). Each main cable is composed of 26,108 wires amounting to a total of 142,520 mi (229,364 km) in length.

Numerous birds nest or roost on the bridge, most notably breeding peregrine falcons. The falcons nest at the top of the Verrazzano–Narrows Bridge's towers, as well as on the Throgs Neck and Marine Parkway Bridges. As the falcons are endangered, the city places bands on each bird and examines the birds' nesting sites each year. The falcons were discovered on the top of the Verrazzano Bridge in 1983, though they had started breeding there several years prior.

== Naming ==
=== Tentative names ===
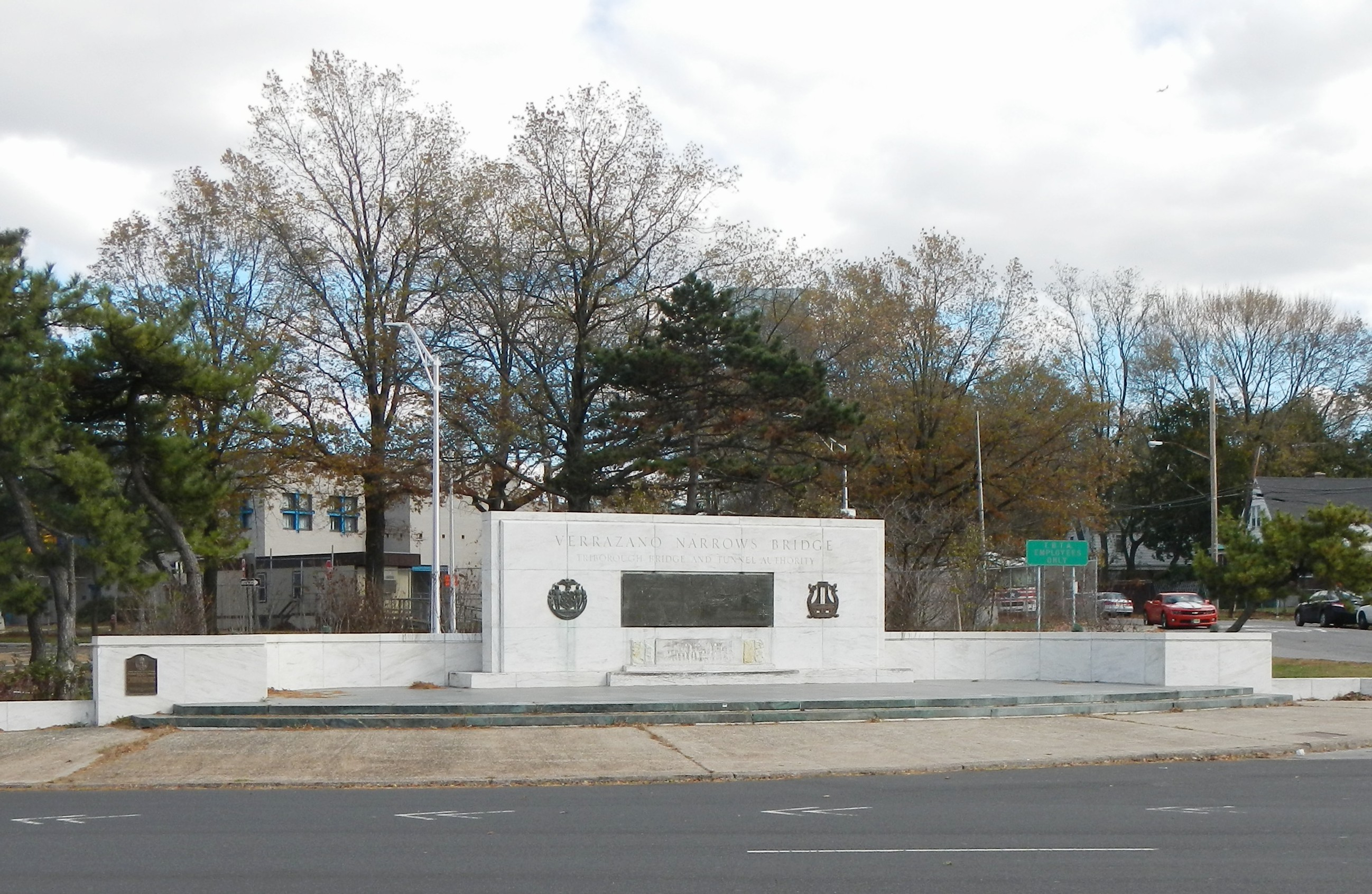
The Verrazano-Narrows Bridge Memorial at Lily Pond Avenue, near the bridge's Staten Island entrance

During the planning stages, the bridge was originally named simply the "Narrows Bridge". The co-naming of the bridge for Verrazzano (with two "z"s) was controversial. It was first proposed in 1951 by the Italian Historical Society of America when the bridge was in the planning stage. After Robert Moses turned down the initial proposal, the society undertook a public relations campaign to re-establish Giovanni da Verrazzano's largely forgotten reputation and to promote the idea of naming the bridge for him. The society's director, John N. LaCorte, successfully lobbied several governors of states along the U.S.'s East Coast to proclaim April 17, the anniversary of Verrazzano's arrival in the harbor, as Verrazzano Day. LaCorte then approached the TBTA again but was turned down a second time. The explorer's name had previously been suggested for the George Washington Bridge, located several miles north, in 1931.

The Italian Historical Society later successfully lobbied to get a bill introduced in the New York State Assembly to name the bridge for the explorer. After the introduction of the bill, the Staten Island Chamber of Commerce joined the society in promoting the name. In April 1958, Governor W. Averell Harriman announced that he would propose naming the Narrows Bridge after Verrazzano in honor of the explorer's voyage to New York Harbor in 1524. His successor, Nelson Rockefeller, put his support behind the one-"z" "Verrazano" name in April 1959, saying that it was the Americans' standard way of spelling the explorer's name. According to Gay Talese, the one-"z" name was bolstered by the fact that it appeared on the bridge's first construction contracts in 1959; this incorrect spelling persisted in all subsequent references to the bridge.

Although the "Verrazano" name was not finalized yet, The New York Times noted that the Staten Island Ferry boat carrying dignitaries to the bridge's August 1959 groundbreaking ceremony was named the "Verrazzano". The Times further stated that Harriman and Mayor Wagner had respectively proposed a "Verrazzano Bridge" and proclaimed a "Verrazzano Day". The Staten Island Chamber of Commerce opposed the Verrazzano name altogether, saying that the proper name of the bridge should be "Staten Island Bridge" because there was also a "Brooklyn Bridge", a "Manhattan Bridge", a "Queens Bridge", and a "Bronx Bridge". The Italian Historical Society was reportedly perplexed about the opposition to the "Verrazano" name. In response to the Staten Island Chamber of Commerce's opposition, the TBTA offered to add a hyphen between "Verrazano" and "Narrows".

=== Official name with one "z" ===
Rockefeller signed the "Verrazano" name into law in March 1960, which officially changed the name of the Narrows Bridge to "Verrazano-Narrows Bridge". The naming issue did not encounter further controversy until 1963, after the assassination of President John F. Kennedy. This prompted a series of suggestions to rename structures, monuments, and agencies across the United States after the late president. A petition to rename the Verrazano Bridge for Kennedy received thousands of signatures. In response, LaCorte contacted the president's brother, United States Attorney General Robert F. Kennedy, who told LaCorte that he would assure that the bridge would keep the "Verrazano" name. Ultimately, the Verrazano-Narrows Bridge kept its name, while Idlewild Airport in Queens was renamed after Kennedy.

In part due to discrimination against Italian-Americans, the bridge's official name was widely ignored by local news outlets at the time of the dedication. Some radio announcers and newspapers omitted any reference to Verrazzano, referring to the bridge as the Narrows Bridge, or the Brooklyn–Staten Island Bridge. The society continued its lobbying efforts to promote the name in the following years until the name became firmly established. Another ethnic slur for the bridge was its nickname as the "Guinea Gangplank", referring to the Italian-Americans who subsequently moved from Brooklyn to Staten Island. The Italian Historical Society's published references to the bridge's name all contained two "z"s.

=== Bills to change bridge's name ===
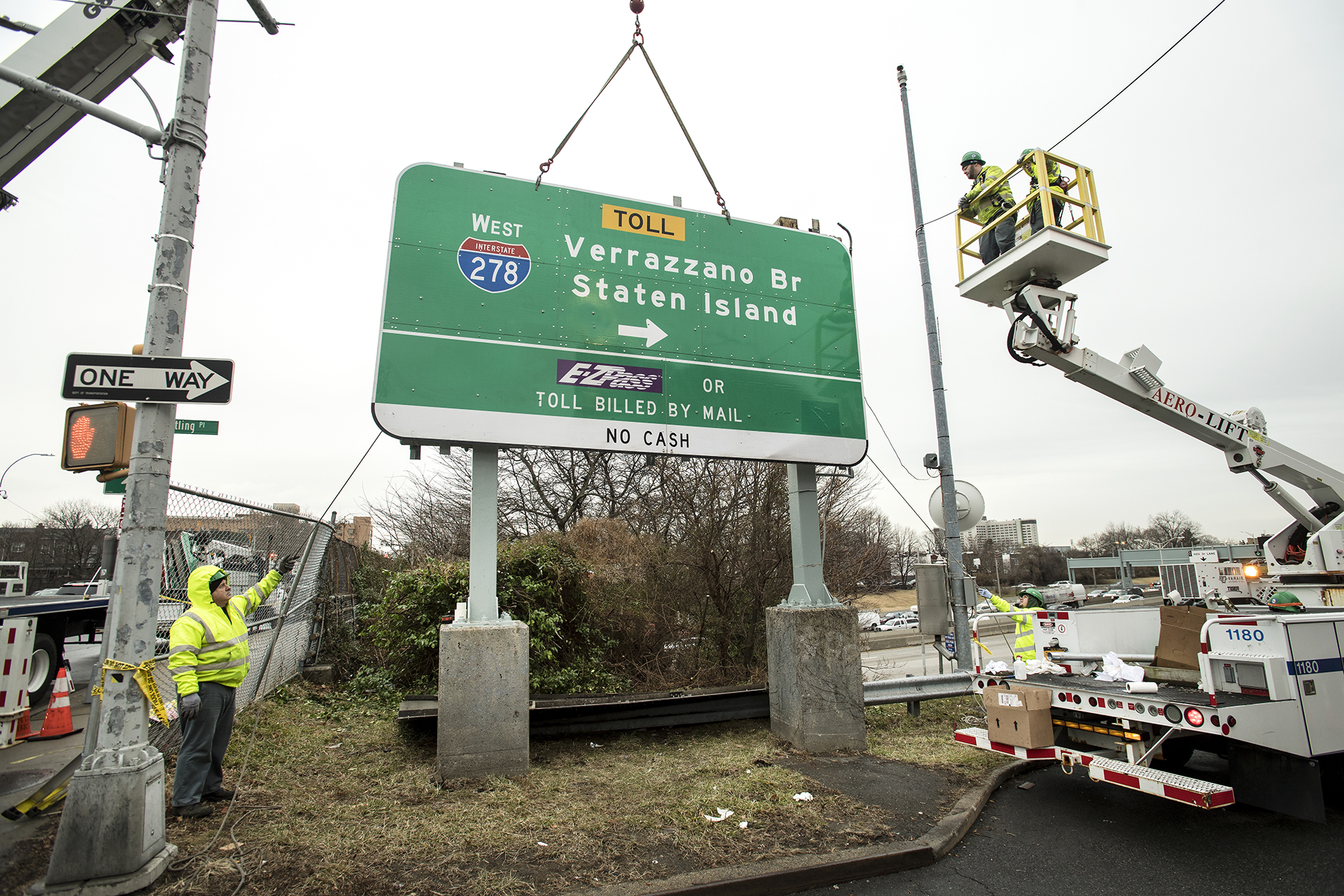
Installation of new road signs correcting the spelling to Verrazzano with two "z"s in February 2020

In June 2016, St. Francis College student Robert Nash started a petition to spell Giovanni da Verrazzano's name on the bridge correctly, with two "z"s. The petition gained support from politicians including New York state senators Martin Golden and Andrew Lanza. In December 2016, Golden and Lanza sent letters to the Metropolitan Transportation Authority CEO Thomas F. Prendergast, in which they recommended that the bridge's name be spelled correctly. An MTA spokesperson said the agency was reviewing the letter.

A bill to formally change the bridge's name passed the New York State Senate in 2017 before being defeated in the New York State Assembly in early 2018. In mid-2018, Golden sponsored a State Senate bill to change the bridge's spelling to "Verrazzano" with two "z"s. On June 6 of that year, the Senate unanimously passed a bill to change the spelling of the Verrazano-Narrows Bridge, sending the measure to the New York State Assembly and the office of New York governor Andrew Cuomo for approval. If the bill was passed, the MTA would modify nearly a hundred road signs at a cost of $350,000. The Assembly passed the bill on June 21, sending the measure to Cuomo with a minor modification. As a cost-saving measure, existing signs would retain the one-"z" spelling, and only new signs would contain the double-"z" spelling. On October 1, 2018, Cuomo signed the bill into law, effectively changing the legal spelling of the bridge to the "Verrazzano–Narrows Bridge". The first signs with the corrected spelling were installed in February 2020.

== Tolls ==
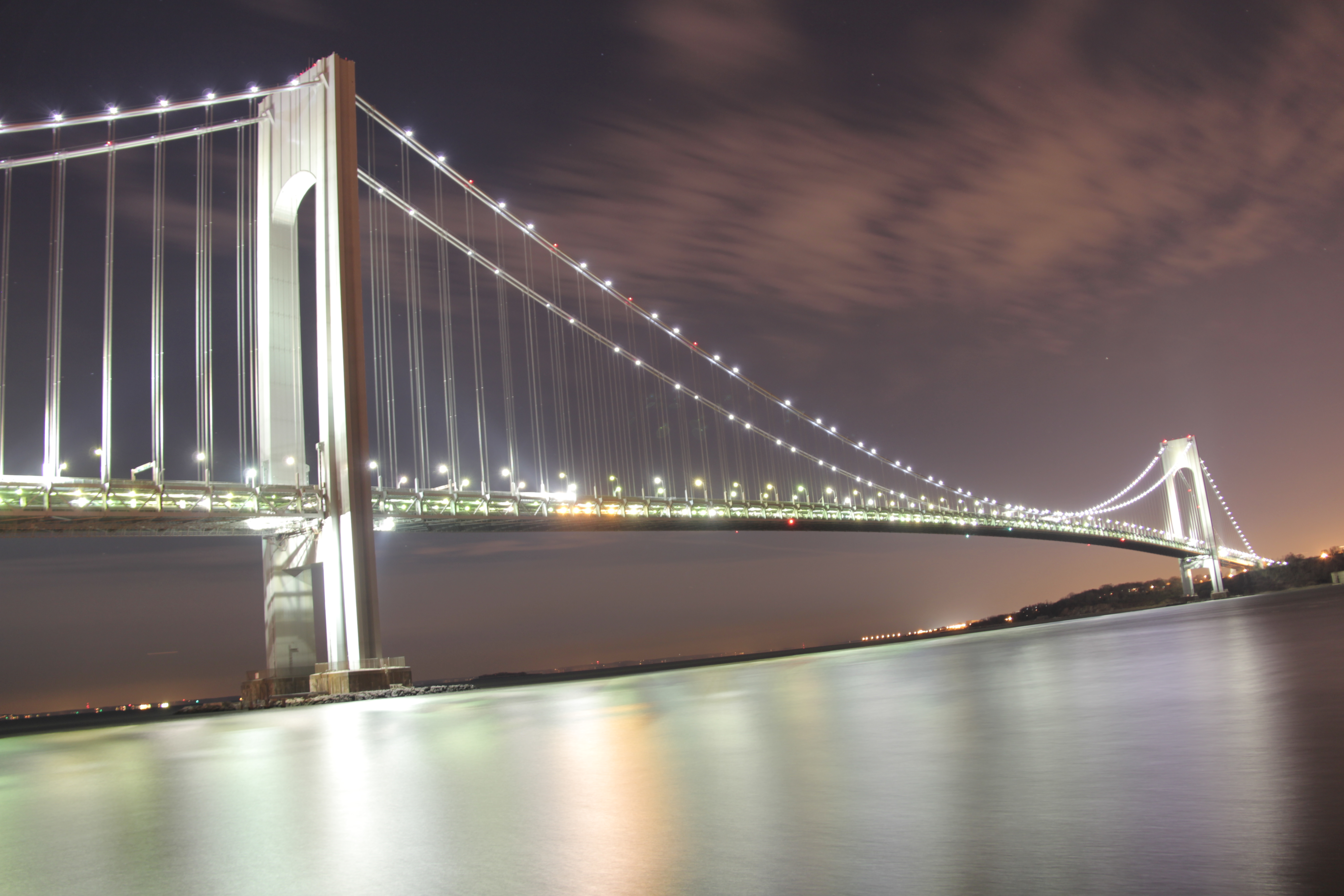
Verrazzano–Narrows Bridge, seen from Brooklyn at night

As of January 4, 2026, the toll is $12.03 per car or $5.06 per motorcycle for toll-by-plate and out of state E-ZPass users. E-ZPass users with transponders issued by the New York E‑ZPass Customer Service Center pay $7.46 per car or $3.25 per motorcycle. Mid-Tier NYCSC E-ZPass users pay $9.79 per car or $4.18 per motorcycle.

The Staten Island Resident Rebate Program provides a discounted rate of $2.75 to registered residents of Staten Island who use E-ZPass. In the event that the Resident Rebate Program is discontinued, the effective toll for Staten Island residents with E-ZPasses would be set at $3.68. Until April 2021, Staten Island residents could request an E-ZPass Flex; when three or more people were in a passenger vehicle, they could travel at a reduced rate of $1.70. Non-residents do not get the rebated or discounted rates. A bill that passed in the New York State Senate in May 2019 would give the discounted rate to Brooklyn residents with E-ZPass who cross at least 10 times per month. The discount would only apply to non-commercial vehicles.

Prior to the implementation of two-way tolling, the undiscounted tolls for passenger cars were higher than for most other tolled crossings in the U.S. The tolls from the Verrazzano–Narrows Bridge grossed the MTA $417 million in 2017, and more than 85 percent of motorists paid a discounted toll rate.

=== One-way toll ===
An urban legend has it that tolls were to be abolished once the bridge's construction bonds were paid off, but this has been debunked by the Staten Island Advance. Originally, all drivers paid the same toll to cross the Verrazzano–Narrows Bridge. Staten Island residents were the only residents of New York City who had to pay a toll in order to enter their home borough, since all four of Staten Island's vehicular crossings collected tolls. This put Staten Island motorists at a financial disadvantage compared with drivers who lived in other boroughs. A bill to reduce the tolls for Staten Islanders was introduced in the New York City Council in 1975. Governor Mario Cuomo signed another law to give Staten Island residents discounted tolls in 1983, after years of petitioning and opposition from his two predecessors.

From its opening until 1986, the toll was collected in both directions. In 1985, U.S. Representative Guy V. Molinari co-sponsored a bill that would require the MTA to collect the Verrazzano–Narrows Bridge's toll in the Staten Island-bound direction only. This came after Staten Island residents had complained about pollution from idling vehicles. In December of that year, the United States House of Representatives passed a bill that prohibited the MTA from collecting tolls from Brooklyn-bound vehicles, under penalty of a loss of highway funding. Accordingly, in March 1986, the MTA started a pilot program where it charged a $3.50 toll for Staten Island-bound vehicles rather than charging a $1.75 toll in both directions. The pilot program was extended to six months, but it was controversial due to the dubious benefits involved. The new toll plan not only caused a drop in revenues, but also caused congestion in Manhattan and Brooklyn and air pollution in Manhattan. Canal Street in Lower Manhattan, which connected to the Holland Tunnel to New Jersey, saw the most severe congestion, as drivers would go through New Jersey and use the Bayonne Bridge to pay a cheaper toll to enter Staten Island. Fatal accidents involving pedestrians in Lower Manhattan also increased greatly as a result.

In 1987, the MTA supported removing the one-way toll because it reduced MTA revenues by $7 million a year. At that point, Cuomo proposed reinstating an eastbound toll for trucks. In 1990, it was noted that about 455,000 more eastbound vehicles per year were using the bridge's eastbound lanes compared with before the toll reconfiguration, but that this was heavily outweighed by the 1.5 million fewer westbound vehicles per year. Residents of Manhattan and Brooklyn wanted the tolls changed so that either eastbound vehicles only, or both directions, would be tolled.

In 2019, the United States House of Representatives voted in favor of a federal appropriations bill, which would repeal the bridge's one-way-toll mandate and allow half of the then-current toll to be applied to both directions. At the time, the Verrazzano–Narrows Bridge was the only American bridge with a federal mandate controlling its toll collections. President Donald Trump signed the bill in December 2019, but the MTA had yet to determine at that time when it would enact two-way tolls. After the mandate was repealed, the MTA had to seek approval for split tolls from its board, and install tolling gantries to support split tolls. On December 1, 2020, two-way tolls were reinstated.

=== Electronic tolling and tollbooth removals ===
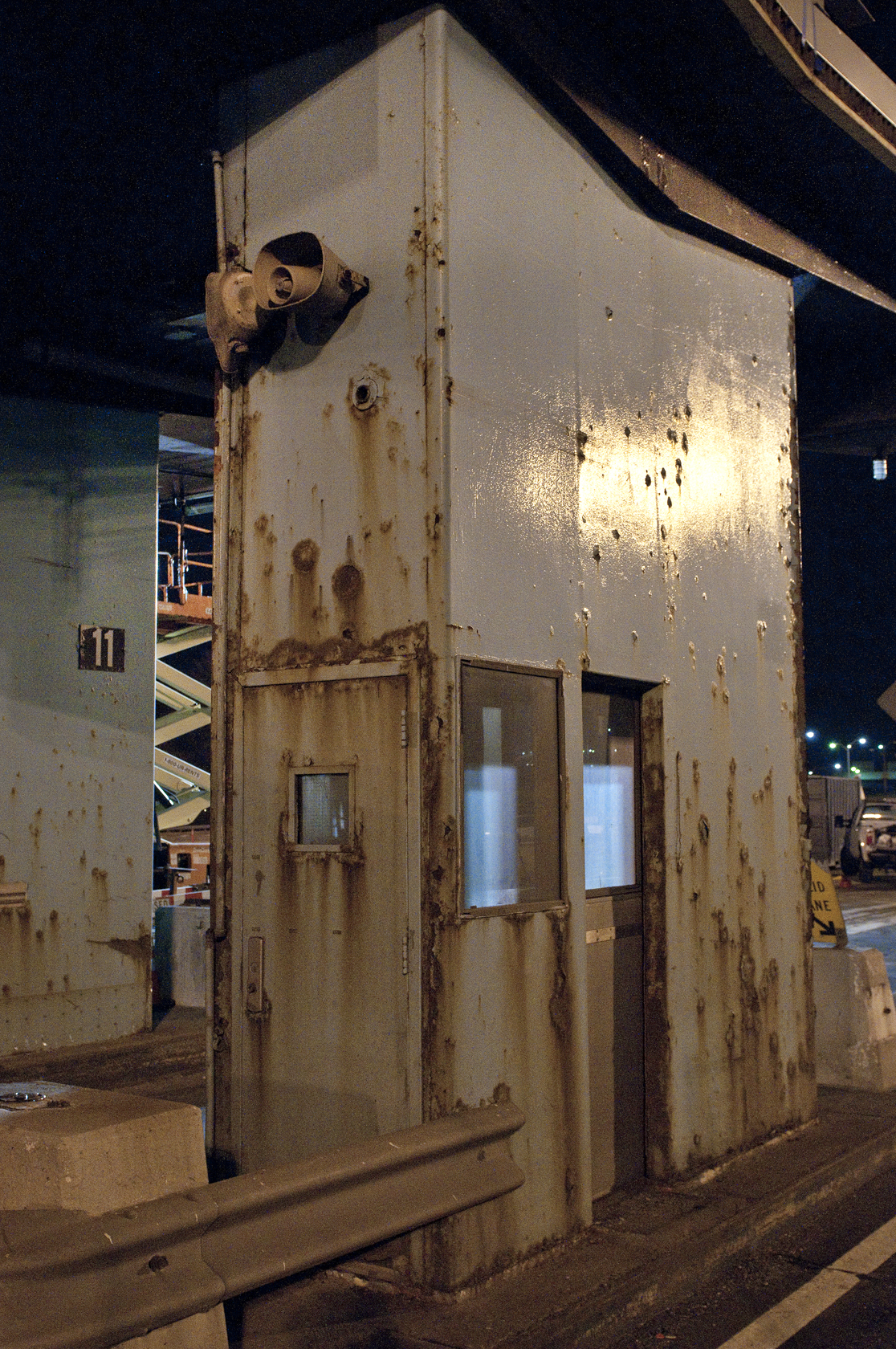
Demolition of the bridge's eastbound toll plazas in 2012

E-ZPass was introduced at the Verrazzano–Narrows Bridge in late 1995. Its introduction helped to reduce traffic congestion at the tollbooths; in March 1997, it was found that drivers with E-ZPass were able to pass through the westbound tollbooths within 30 seconds, compared to 15 minutes for drivers paying with tokens or cash. In February 1998, the MTA discontinued the sale of toll tokens on the Verrazzano–Narrows Bridge, except to Staten Island residents purchasing them in bulk.

Despite not collecting tolls in the eastbound direction since 1986, the MTA did not do anything with the unused booths for a quarter-century. In 2010, eight of the eleven Brooklyn-bound toll booths were removed as part of the first phase of a project to improve traffic flow at the toll plaza. Two years later, the last of the eastbound tollbooths was removed. Until 2020, tolls were still collected in the Staten Island-bound direction only, and congestion within Lower Manhattan persisted due to the bridge's one-way westbound toll, which was double the standard toll for several of the city's other bridges.

Open-road cashless tolling began on July 8, 2017. The westbound tollbooths were also dismantled, and drivers were no longer able to pay cash at the bridge. Instead, cameras and E-ZPass readers are mounted on new overhead gantries manufactured by TransCore near where the booths were located. A vehicle without E-ZPass has a picture taken of its license plate and a bill for the toll is mailed to its owner. For E-ZPass users, sensors detect their transponders wirelessly.

=== Historical tolls ===
History of passenger cash tolls for the Verrazzano–Narrows Bridge
Years	Toll	Toll equivalent in 2025	Ref.	Direction collected	Method
1964–1972	$0.50	$3.85–5.19		Both directions	Cash only
1972–1975	$0.75	$4.49–5.77		Both directions	Cash only
1975–1982	$1.00	$3.34–5.98		Both directions	Cash only
1982–1984	$1.25	$3.87–4.17		Both directions	Cash only
1984 – January 1986	$1.50	$4.41–4.65		Both directions	Cash only
January–March 1986	$1.75	$5.14		Both directions	Cash only
March 1986 – 1987	$3.50	$9.92–10.28		Westbound	Cash only
1987–1989	$4.00	$10.39–11.34		Westbound	Cash only
1989–1993	$5.00	$11.14–12.99		Westbound	Cash only
1993–1996	$6.00	$12.32–13.37		Westbound	Cash only
1996–2003	$7.00	$12.25–14.37		Westbound	Cash/E-ZPass
2003–2005	$8.00	$13.19–14.00		Westbound	Cash/E-ZPass
2005–2008	$9.00	$13.46–14.84		Westbound	Cash/E-ZPass
2008–2010	$10.00	$14.76–14.95		Westbound	Cash/E-ZPass
2010–2015	$13.00	$17.66–19.19		Westbound	Cash/E-ZPass
2015–2017	$16.00	$21.02–21.73		Westbound	Cash/E-ZPass
2017–2019	$17.00	$21.41–22.33		Westbound	Electronic only
2019–2020	$19.00	$23.64–23.93		Westbound	Electronic only
December 2020 – April 2021	$9.50	$11.29–11.82		Both directions	Electronic only
2021–2023	$10.17	$10.75–12.08		Both directions	Electronic only
2023–2026	$11.19	$11.19–11.82		Both directions	Electronic only
2026–present	$12.03	$12.03		Both directions	Electronic only

== Bridge usage ==
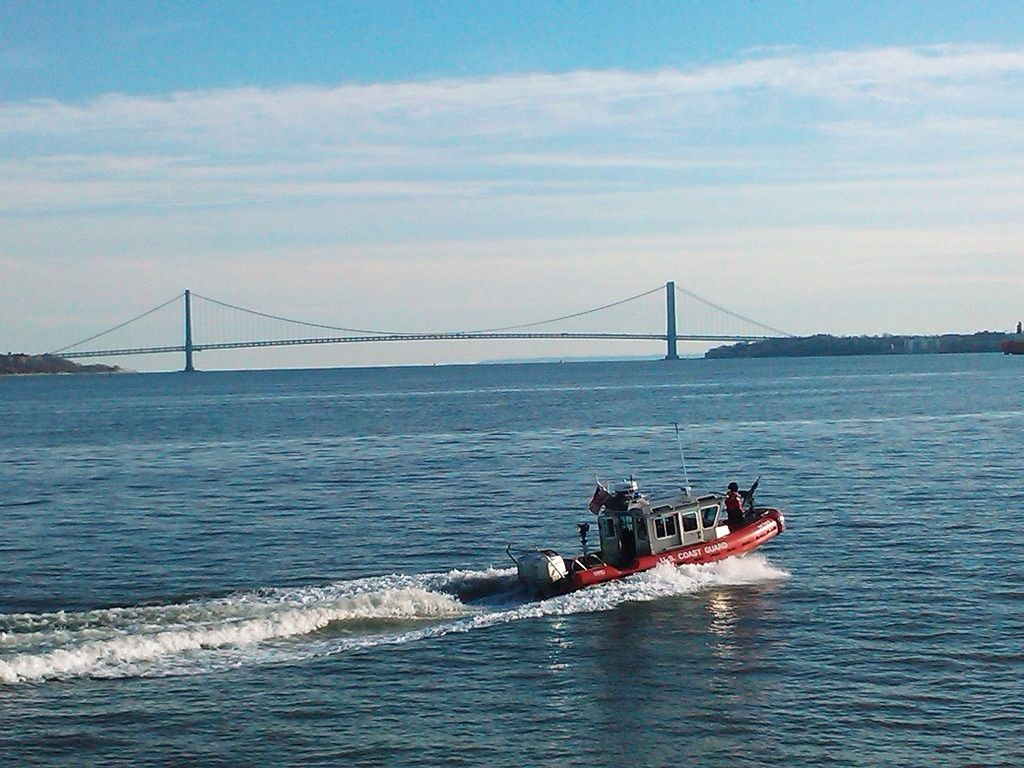
The U.S. Coast Guard on patrol in Upper New York Bay with the Verrazzano–Narrows Bridge (background) spanning The Narrows between Brooklyn (on left) and Staten Island (on right)

In 2015, an average of 202,523 vehicles used the Verrazzano–Narrows Bridge daily in both directions. As of 2015, the Verrazzano–Narrows Bridge carries more traffic than the Outerbridge Crossing, the Bayonne Bridge, and the Goethals Bridge combined. These three bridges, which connect Staten Island with New Jersey, were used by a combined 168,984 vehicles in both directions.

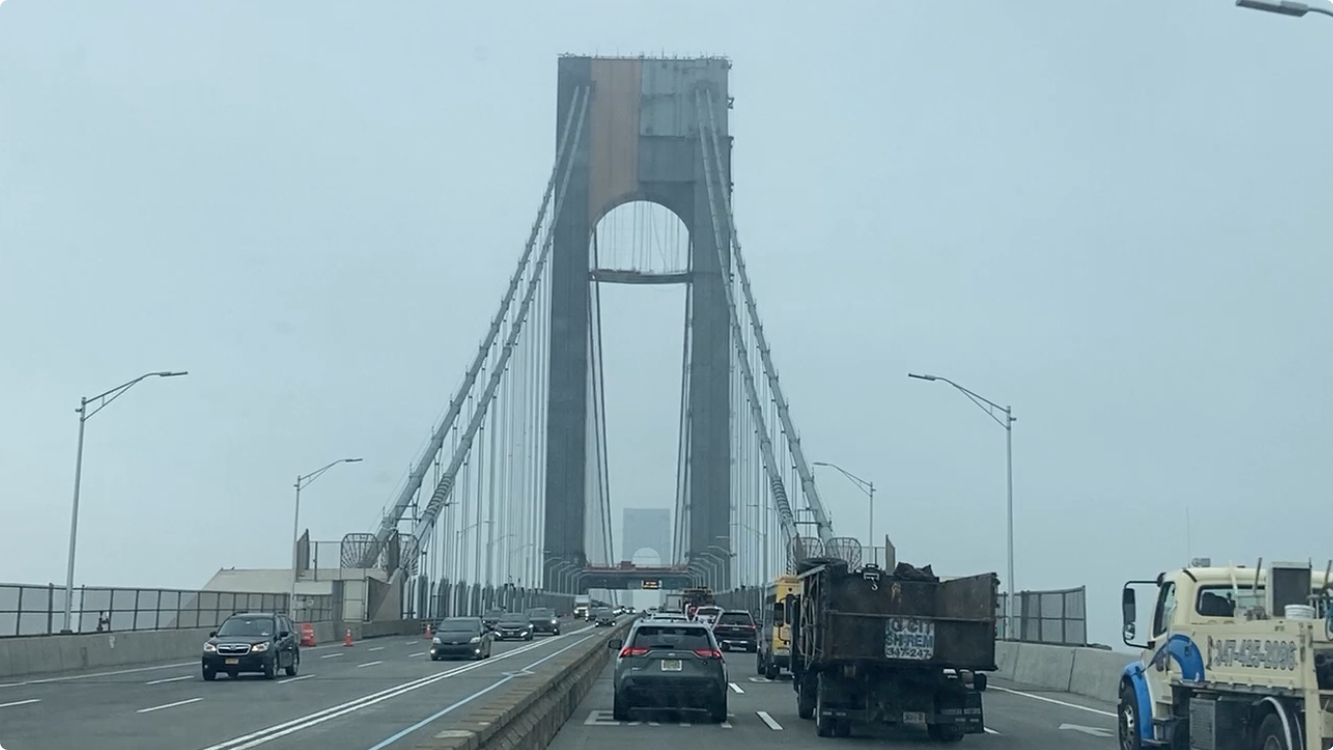
Crossing over the bridge on a cloudy day

In 2011, advocacy group Transportation for America rated the Verrazzano–Narrows Bridge as New York's most dangerous, because of the combination of deterioration and the number of people who cross it per day. The MTA responded that the Verrazzano–Narrows Bridge, which was both the newest large bridge and the longest bridge in the state, was structurally sound, and that the bridge had passed its most recent inspection. The MTA attributed Transportation for America's results to a "misinterpretation of inspection records".

Signs at both ends of the Verrazzano–Narrows Bridge forbid photography and videotaping while on the bridge. These signs were installed after the September 11 attacks in 2001, when the MTA started confiscating film from individuals who were caught filming MTA crossings. However, the ban had been implemented long before the attacks to prevent people from taking close-up pictures of the bridge.

=== Public transportation ===
Three local bus routes operated by MTA Regional Bus Operations use the Verrazzano–Narrows Bridge: the S53 local route, the S79 Select Bus Service route, and the S93 limited-stop route. The bridge also carries 20 express bus routes that connect Staten Island with Manhattan and are also operated by New York City Transit. They are the SIM1, SIM1C, SIM2, SIM3, SIM3C, SIM4, SIM4C, SIM4X, SIM5, SIM6, SIM7, SIM9, SIM10, SIM15, SIM31, SIM32, SIM33, SIM33C, SIM34, and SIM35.

As part of a proposed expansion of the New York City Subway, a subway line on the bridge was considered early in the planning process, but Moses rejected the plan, ostensibly over cost concerns. Other bridges proposed and built by Moses, including the Triborough Bridge, Henry Hudson Bridge, Bronx-Whitestone Bridge, and Throgs Neck Bridge, also lack provisions for subway tracks. According to biographer Robert Caro, Moses purposely excluded any provisions for mass transit on his bridges to promote private transportation.

=== Pedestrian and bicycle access ===
==== Lack of walkway or bikeway ====
The Verrazzano–Narrows Bridge was not built with a pedestrian walkway. At the time, it was seen as too expensive, and planners additionally explained the lack of a walkway as a benefit that would help prevent suicide jumps. Non-motorized transportation occurs only if the bridge is closed to regular traffic, such as during the New York City Marathon and the Five Boro Bike Tour. In 1976, the Verrazzano–Narrows Bridge was designated as the starting point of the New York City Marathon. The 1976 marathon was the first year in the marathon's six-year history that its course went outside Manhattan. Since then, the marathon has started at the bridge's Staten Island end every year. The bridge is entirely closed whenever the marathon takes place, and it is partially closed during the bike tours. Originally, the organizers of these events used the bridge free of charge; in the 2020s, the MTA began requesting that the events' organizers pay a fee to compensate for the loss of toll revenue. The MTA ultimately dropped its request that the marathon reimburse the agency for lost toll revenue.

The lack of a walkway did not completely prevent suicides, since by 1975, four people had died after jumping off the bridge. The number of suicides has increased over time, despite efforts at deterrence. A sign that says "Life Is Worth Living" is located on the Staten Island approach. In 2008, the MTA also installed six suicide hotlines on the bridge. In December 2019, the MTA began installing a prototype suicide barrier after a series of fatal jumps from the bridge. A permanent suicide barrier was installed from 2021 to 2022.

==== Proposals for pedestrian and bike access ====
There have been calls for a walkway or bike lane on the Verrazzano–Narrows Bridge since its opening, when several people protested over the lack of bike lanes at the bridge's opening ceremony. In 1977, as a temporary solution, the city modified three buses to fit 12 bikes and 20 passengers each, then operated these buses on a new "S7 Verrazano Bridge" route. In 1993, the New York City Department of City Planning called for a footpath across the bridge as part of their Greenway Plan for New York City. The next year, the city sought a $100,000 federal grant to fund a feasibility study into a Verrazzano Bridge pedestrian and bike path. In 1997, the DCP released its study, which found that two footpaths running between the suspender ropes along the upper level, separated for pedestrian and cyclist use, would cost a minimum of $26.5 million. The MTA at the time expressed concern about the "safety and liability inherent in any strategy that introduces pedestrian and bicycle access" to the bridge.

Local residents on both sides of the bridge started advocating for the construction of a walkway or bikeway on the Verrazzano–Narrows Bridge in 2002. Dave Lutz, the director of the Neighborhood Open Space Coalition nonprofit, stated that after the September 11 attacks, Staten Islanders walked home along the bridge's roadway. Mayor Michael Bloomberg promised to look into the possibility in October 2003.

The Harbor Ring Committee was formed in 2011 to advocate for the completion of the Harbor Ring route, which would create a 50-mile (80 km) ring around New York Harbor, including a footpath across the Verrazzano. In spring 2013 the committee began an online petition that generated more than 2,500 signatures, as well as an organizational sign-on letter with the support of 16 regional and local advocacy and planning organizations. That year, the MTA announced that it would conduct a three-year feasibility study for installing a pathway on the Verrazzano–Narrows Bridge. The MTA considered plans for a bike lane in 2015, during the reconstruction of the Verrazzano–Narrows Bridge. The MTA estimated that a dedicated multiple-use pathway would cost $400 million due to the need for a minimum width to accommodate a fire engine and construction of entrance and exit ramps. The plan was ultimately rejected in March 2019 over safety concerns.

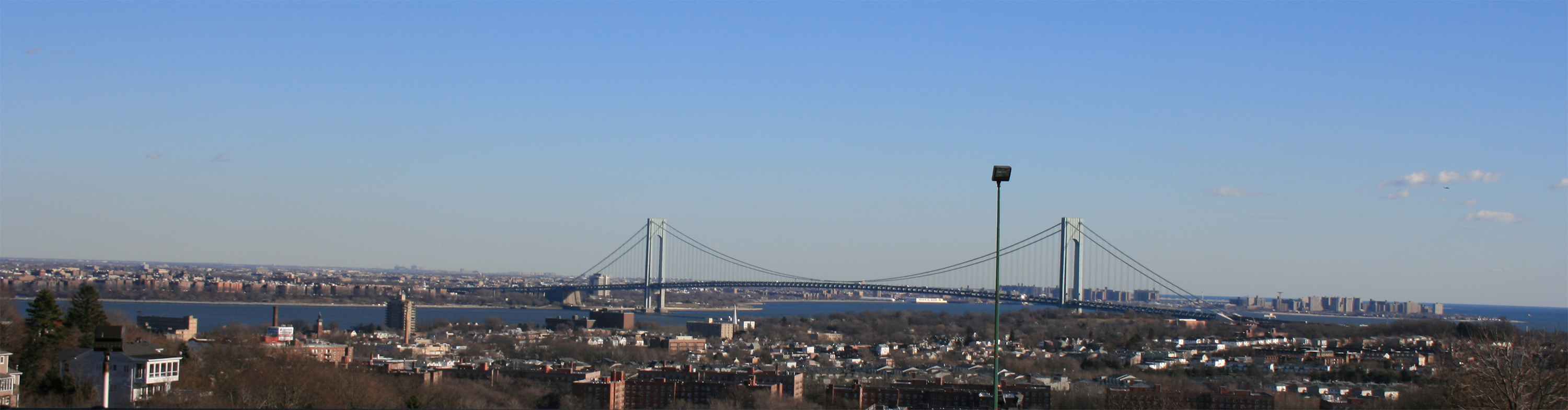
Verrazzano–Narrows Bridge connecting eastern Staten Island to Brooklyn
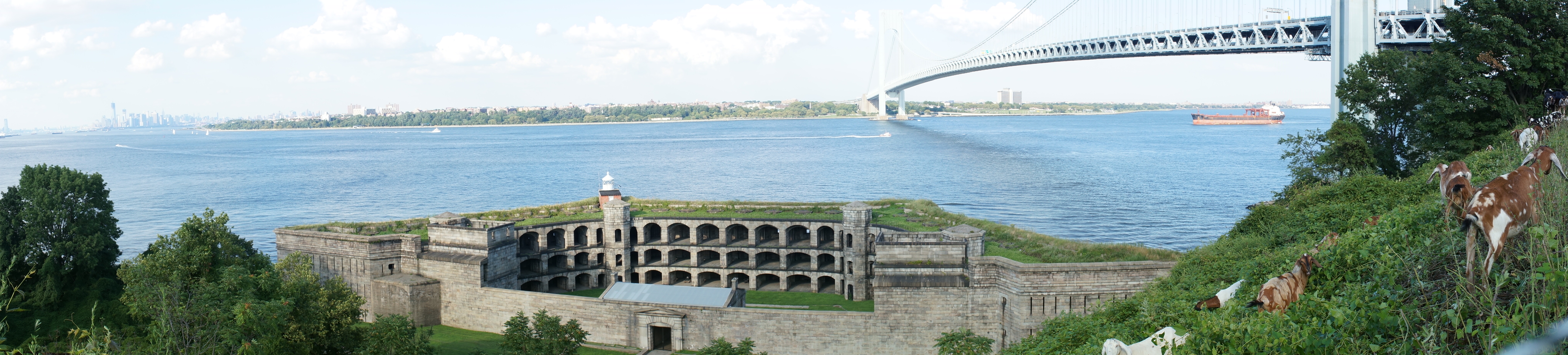
Panorama of New York Bay from Fort Wadsworth in Staten Island, including Battery Weed on The Narrows (foreground), the Verrazzano–Narrows Bridge, and the skyline of Lower Manhattan (background on left)
