= Leopold Just =

American-Latvian engineer

Leopold Just (Latvian: Leopolds Justs, February 26, 1903 – February 25, 1999) was a Latvian-born engineer who came to New York City in 1921, and eventually became a partner in the Ammann & Whitney firm of consulting engineers. He was involved in the design of many major New York City bridges, including parts of the George Washington Bridge and the Lincoln Tunnel, the Throgs Neck Bridge linking the Bronx and Queens and, most notably, the Verrazzano–Narrows Bridge linking Staten Island with Brooklyn. His work outside of New York City included the Washington Metro, Ohio Turnpike and Connecticut Turnpike. He earned a degree in civil engineering from the Polytechnic Institute of Brooklyn in 1929, and died at age 95.
