= James Sessions =

American watercolor painter (1882–1962)

James Milton Sessions (September 20, 1882 in Rome, New York – November 14, 1962) was an American artist. Sessions was a master watercolorist of marine, sporting, and military World War II scenes. He developed a love of the sea and is probably best known as a painter of marine subjects. Sessions painted images of numerous locations, from the Bahamas to New England's busy fishing harbors, north to the raw fishing grounds of Nova Scotia, and ultimately to the Navajo reservations in New Mexico.

== Early life and education ==
He received his first exposure to art from his mother, herself an accomplished artist. He trained at the Art Institute of Chicago from 1903 to 1906 and initially supported himself as a wheelsman aboard Great Lakes ships from 1906 to 1914, later serving as a boatswain's mate in the Illinois Naval Reserve during World War I. He also worked as a commercial illustrator.

== Career ==
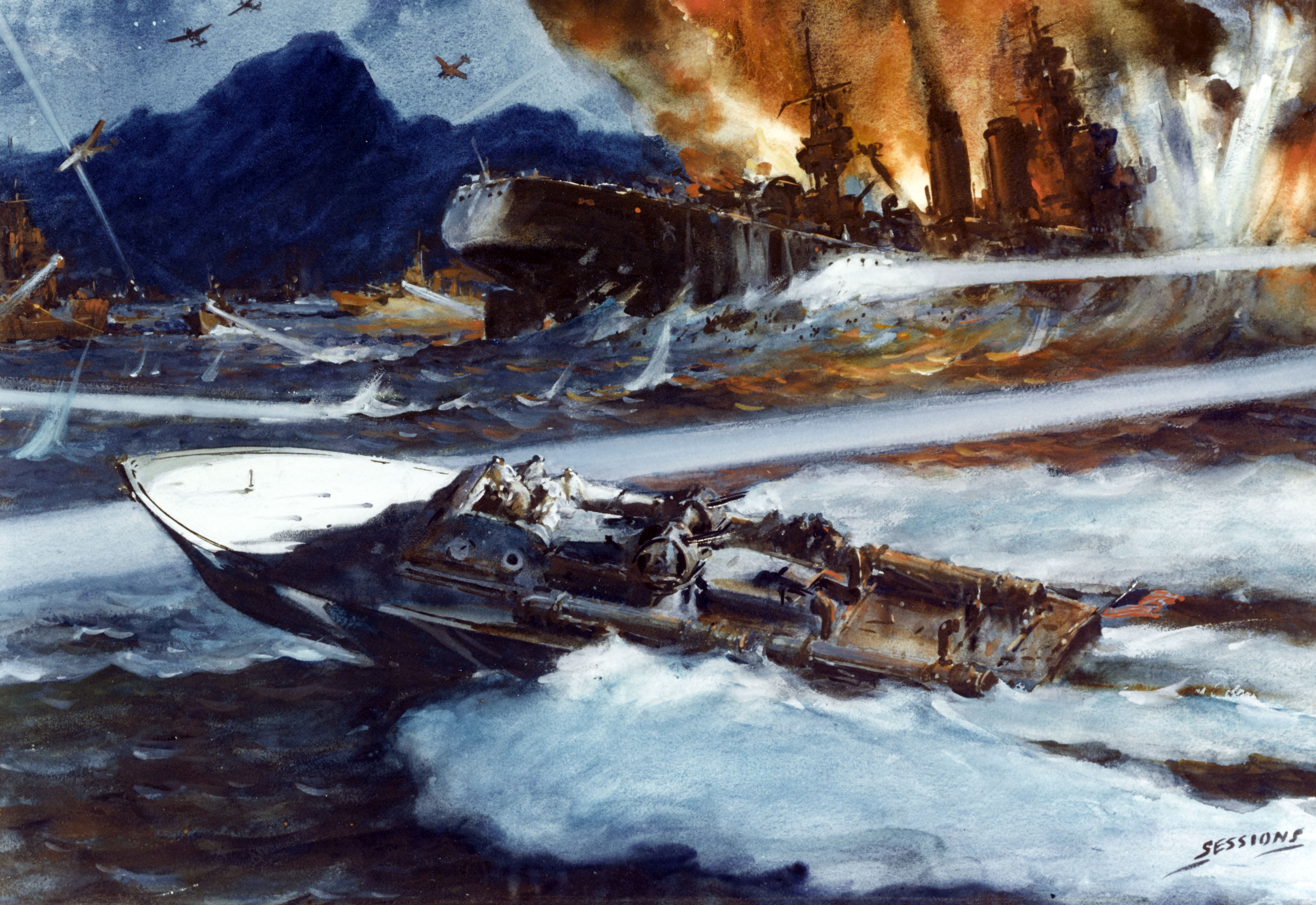
David and Goliath by James Sessions

Some of Sessions' works documented important World War II events. They visually portray and convey the spirit of the American fighting forces in both the Pacific and European campaigns, commencing with the bombing of Pearl Harbor, followed by D-Day through to the final phases of the Pacific war, such as Jimmy Doolittle's daylight bombing raids of the Japanese mainland to the unconditional surrender of the Japanese military. Sessions is widely considered to be the greatest "brush reporter" of World War II.

The Chicago Tribune newspaper utilized his talents. Sessions was also commissioned by the Willys-Overland company to produce a series of 8 paintings that were featured in ads for Willys Jeep, including a 1943 Willys Jeep ad showing the Coast Guard at Guadalcanal. Sessions created other wartime advertisements, including a Borg-Warner ad in 1945 showing the mass production of radiators and clutches for motorized warfare manufactured in Detroit.

In 1962, the New York Graphic Society commissioned him to make four paintings, reproductions of which were distributed as part of the Society's Works of Masters Group. Many of his other paintings have been reproduced over the years, issued as posters and as high quality reprints on watercolor paper.

Sessions' work is highly collectible in the field of World War II militaria. His works can be found in Presidential collections, numerous important corporate collections and military establishments throughout the country. Although very prolific in the style of John Whorf and Ogden Pleissner, he destroyed much of his own work.

The artist Will Stewart also apprenticed under him.

== Exhibitions ==
Sessions' work has been exhibited or collected at the Metropolitan Museum of Art in New York City, the Art Institute of Chicago, the Museum of Fine Art, Milwaukee, the Munson-Williams-Proctor Institute and the Museum of Fine Art, Cleveland.

In 1975, one of his paintings of Jamaica was featured in a group show at the Hills County Saving & Loans Building in Kerreville, Texas.

== Works ==
This is an incomplete list of the works of James M. Sessions:

- Born for War–Ready for Peace, Willy's Jeep Ad
- David and Goliath (c. 1942)
- Engineers Bridge New Guinea Under Fire (c. 1943), Willy's Jeep Ad
- From Fighter to Farm Hand, Willy's Jeep Ad
- Fishing Boat on Heavy Sea (1939)
- Jeep in the Heart of Burma, Willy's Jeep Ad
- Jeep Planning, Willy's Jeep Ad
- Rear of Dominic Street Stores acquired by the Munson-Williams-Proctor Institute, Utica NY in 1990.
- Three Men Launching a Rowboat.
- Will the Jeep Speed Up Farming?, Willy's Jeep Ad

== Personal life ==
Sessions was married in 1906 to Frances Sharp and in Chicago, Illinois, in 1946 to Chrysanthy G. Deamanthopulos.

Sessions died on November 14, 1962, in Chicago, at the age of 80. He was survived by his wife Chrysanthy and his son Harold. He was buried in Chicago's Graceland Cemetery.
