= Queens Plaza Court Building =

Building in Queens, New York

Departments of Education and Transportation Building
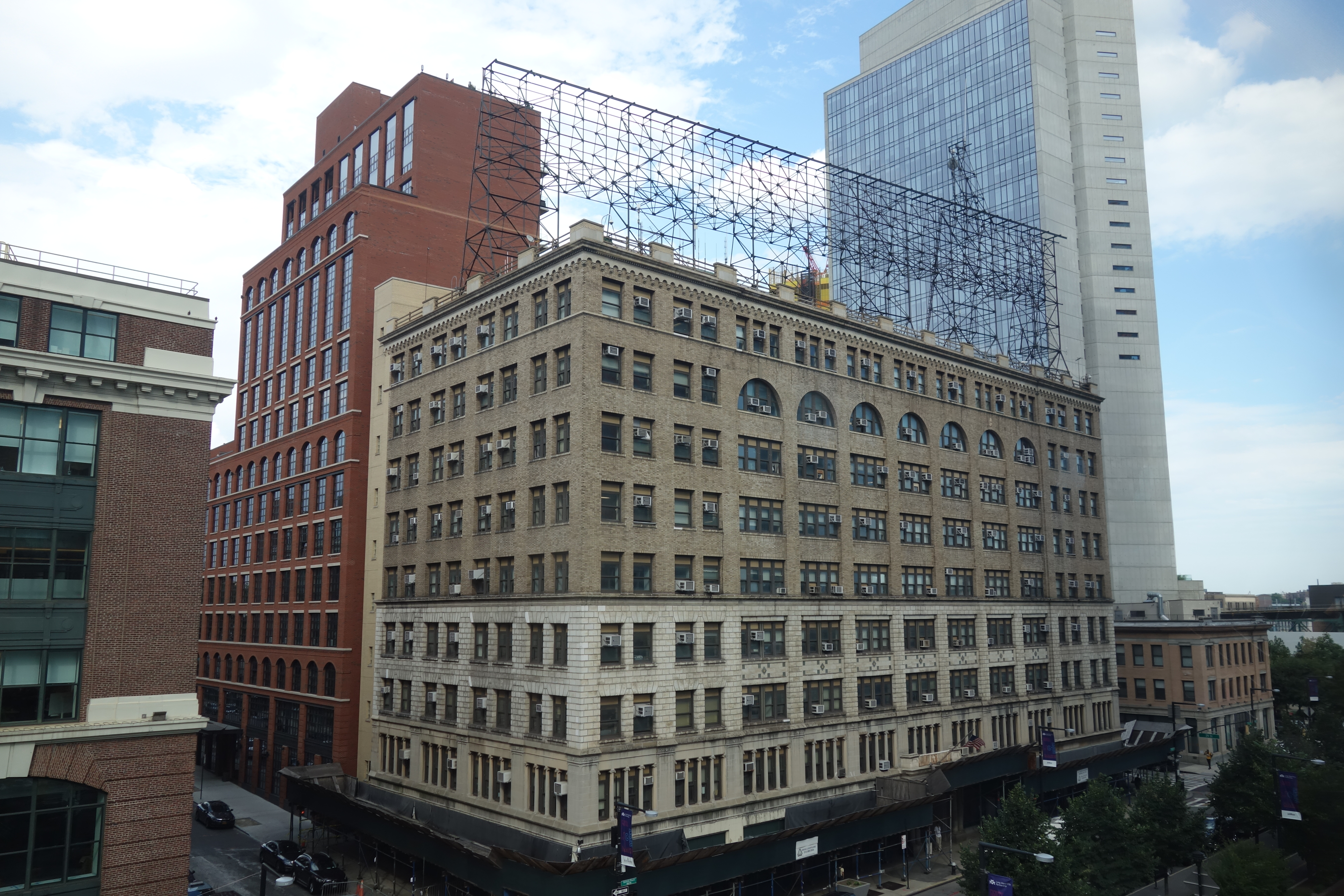
- Interactive map of the Departments of Education and Transportation Building area
- Former names: Queens Plaza Court Building; Electric Building; Pan American Building / PAA Building

General information
- Architectural style: Italianate
- Location: 28-01–28-19 Queens Plaza North; Long Island City, Queens, New York, US
- Coordinates: 40°45′1″N 73°56′17″W
- Current tenants: NYCDOE, NYCDOT
- Year built: 1912
- Renovated: 1927, 1953
- Owner: New York City

Technical details
- Floor count: 9

Design and construction
- Architecture firm: Thompson & Frohling

28-11 Queens Plaza North, originally known as Queens Court Plaza or Queens Plaza Court, is an office building located at Queens Plaza North (Bridge Plaza North) and 29th Street in Long Island City, Queens, New York City. Currently city-owned, it is used as offices for the New York City Department of Education and Department of Transportation.

Completed in 1912, it was one of the first office buildings constructed along Queens Plaza, which would evolve into a financial and commercial district. The building originally housed the Queens Chamber of Commerce and Long Island City Savings Bank, then served as regional offices for Consolidated Edison beginning in 1920. It was expanded from its original four stories into nine stories in 1927. After being used as Army barracks during World War II, the building became the Queens offices of Pan Am. The City of New York began using the building in 1964, and purchased the building in 1974.

== Description ==
The building is located on the north side of the Queensboro Bridge Plaza (Queens Plaza or Bridge Plaza), the Queens approaches to the Queensboro Bridge, between 28th and 29th Streets. Across 28th Street to the west is the Brewster Building. This area on the north side of the bridge plaza is also known as Dutch Kills. The original section of the building fronts Bridge Plaza North, with an addition on the east side of the site at 29th Street; together, the entire building forms an L-shape.

The building is nine stories tall, designed in Italianate architectural style. The original 1912-built portion of the building is four stories tall with a terracotta and limestone facade. Five additional stories were constructed in 1927, featuring a tan-brick exterior. Seven bays or columns of windows on the front (south) face are recessed into the building, topped by arched windows on the eighth floor. The main entrance at the center of the building is bracketed with neoclassical marble columns. The internal structure consists of a steel and concrete frame. The foundation of the original four-story building was designed to support additional floors above. Vaults are located underneath the west side of the building and the surrounding sidewalk. On the roof of the building is a large billboard sign, which currently features no advertising.

The addition on 29th Street, completed in 1953, extends northward and is seven stories tall. It includes a parking garage inside.

=== Usage ===
The building currently contains offices for the New York City Department of Transportation (DOT), and the Department of Education (DOE). The DOE facilities include a Family Welcome Center to assist new immigrants in enrolling in school, and the offices for Region 4 (School Districts 24 and 30) serving Long Island City, Astoria and other nearby areas.

The DOT facility includes the Traffic Management Center (TMC), co-operated with the New York State DOT and the New York City Police Department, located in a small room on the ground floor. The center monitors traffic and controls traffic signals throughout the entire city, and receives data from roadside sensors. Video feed from street cameras is viewed on numerous large monitors. The center was created in the 1960s and upgraded in 2008 and 2011. The third floor contained the NYPD Traffic Enforcement Training center for training civilian (non-police) traffic agents, until the opening of the New York City Police Academy in College Point in 2015. The building also contains the headquarters of the NYPD's School Safety Division, which serves DOE-operated schools.

During its use as Consolidated Edison offices, the ninth floor of the building served as a cafeteria. Under Pan American Airways, the ninth floor was used as a ballroom and meeting space called the "Skyline Room" or "Skytop Roof". The upper floor was also used for meeting space following city takeover.

In the past, a bank branch was located at the southeast corner of the building, utilizing the ground floor and basement. The most recent tenant of this space was a Citibank branch which closed in July 1990, around the time the nearby One Court Square tower opened with its own Citibank branch.

=== Nearby points of interest ===
In addition to the Brewster Building to the west, the former Corn Exchange Bank Building (now the Q4 Hotel) built in 1911 is located across the street to the east. The historic Chase Manhattan Bank Building is located two blocks to the east, adjacent to the modern Sven apartment tower. Dutch Kills Green park is located in front of the Chase Manhattan Bank Building in the median of Queens Plaza. Newcomers High School and the Academy of American Studies are located one block north at 41st Avenue.

=== Transportation ===
The elevated Queensboro Plaza station of the New York City Subway is located in the median of Queens Plaza, with entrances at 27th Street one block west. The underground Queens Plaza station is located two blocks east at Northern Boulevard and Jackson Avenue. The 21st Street–Queensbridge station is located to the west at 21st Street and 41st Avenue. Numerous MTA Regional Bus Operations routes operate in the area, including the Q32, Q60, and Q101 operating across the Queensboro Bridge into Midtown Manhattan, and the Q102 to Roosevelt Island.

== History ==
=== Early history ===
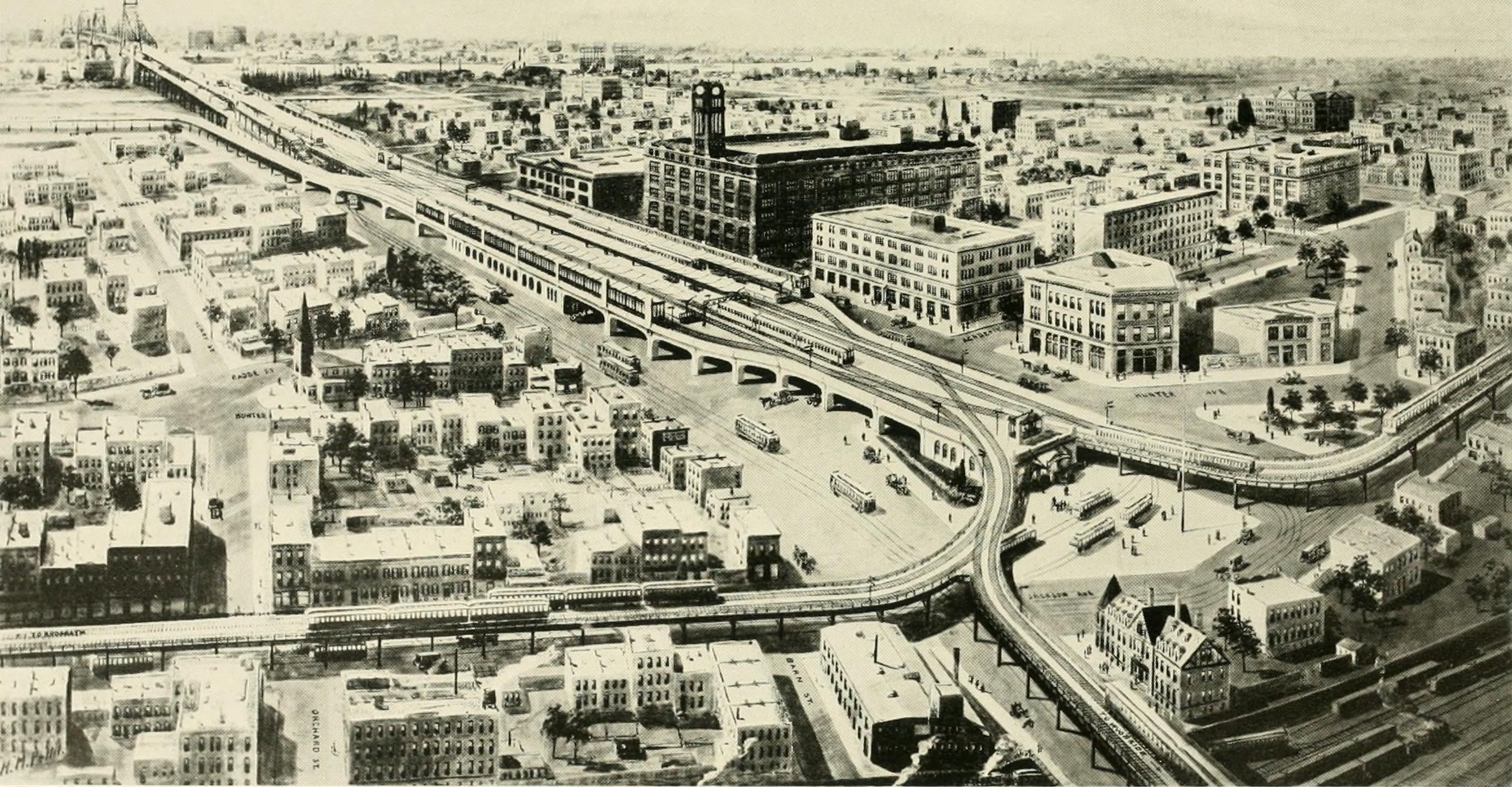
A 1913 illustration of the Queensboro Plaza station, showing the original four-story Queens Plaza Court Building and the Brewster Building.

The Queensboro Bridge between Long Island City and Midtown Manhattan was completed in 1909. During the project, the road feeding into the bridge, originally called Jane Street, was widened from 60 feet (18 m) to 150 feet (46 m) and converted into a tree-lined boulevard and park plaza known as the Queensboro Bridge Plaza. The 1,152-foot (351 m)-long plaza featured service roads on the north and south side leading into the bridge, with a wide landscaped park in the center. The opening of the bridge and the LIRR East River Tunnels into Manhattan immediately catalyzed activity and development in Long Island City. Shortly after the opening of the bridge, the Brewster Building was opened on Bridge Plaza North in 1910.

On August 9, 1911, it was announced that the Queens Plaza Court Company purchased land along Bridge Plaza North across from the Brewster Building between Radde (28th) and Academy (29th) Streets, at the cost of approximately $175,000. The company planned to construct a "modern fireproof office building" on the site, which measured 200 feet (61 m) (along Bridge Plaza North) by 70 feet (21 m). The president of the company was W. Elmer Payntar, with part of the land purchased from the estate of father George H. Payntar. The Payntar family had significant holdings in the Dutch Kills area prior to the 20th Century. Another portion of the plot was purchased from the Queensboro Corporation.

The building was opened in 1912. The structure of the building was designed to support up to eight additional floors, to be erected at a later date. In September 1912, the Queens Chamber of Commerce, founded in 1911, was relocated from Jamaica to the building. That same month, the Long Island City Savings Bank relocated into the building from their original offices at 21 Jackson Avenue in Hunters Point, anticipating more business at the Bridge Plaza. The Manhattan and Queens Traction Company and the New York Telephone Company (now Verizon) leased space in the building in 1913. In 1914 under Police Commissioner Arthur H. Woods, the NYPD established a headquarters for the detectives force of Queens in the building, including office space and a dormitory. With the construction of Queens Plaza Court and other nearby office and bank buildings, and the completion of the Queensboro Plaza station in 1917, Queens Plaza would become the financial hub of Long Island City, and a major financial, political, manufacturing, and transportation center within Queens.

In February 1919, the Queens Plaza Court Building was acquired by the City Real Estate Company. At the time it was referred to as "Long Island City's largest office building". In August 1919, the Long Island City Savings Bank planned to move their offices out of the building. The space would be occupied by the New York and Queens Electric Light and Power Company, a predecessor to and later subsidiary of Consolidated Edison, who planned to construct a fifth floor atop the building. The building also housed offices of the East River Gas Company, another Con Edison predecessor. For these reasons, the Queens Plaza Court Building would become known as the "Electric Building" or "Electrical Building". Long Island City Savings would relocate to a new building across 29th Street in 1920, with the bank branch in the Electric Building leased by the American Trust Company. The Queens Chamber of Commerce would leave the Electric Building in September 1925, and move into the nearby Crescent Plaza Building, to make room for the expanding operations of the Power Company. In 1927, five additional floors were constructed atop the Electric Building.

=== World War II and Pan Am takeover ===
In August 1944 during World War II, the Army Corps of Engineers opened a 500,000-square-foot (46,000 m^{2}) Army Post Office on the site of the former Madison Square Garden Bowl, at 48th Street and Northern Boulevard along Sunnyside Yard. The facility would be used to send Christmas packages to soldiers deployed overseas, and was constructed from May to August over the course of 116 days. As part of the project, the Army's New York Port of Embarkation took over the Electric Building, and renovated it for use as barracks for the 2,000-to-4,000 soldiers working at the post office. The Power Company vacated the building, moving operations to its Astoria offices.

Following the war, in February 1946 New York State Assemblyman Alexander Del Giorno proposed that the state acquire the Electric Building, to use as hub for the state agency offices of Queens. By June of that year, the building had been ceded back to Con Edison, who were looking to sell the building. In November 1946, Pan American World Airways moved into the upper eight floors of the Electric Building, leasing the building for 20 years. The building would be used for the company's systems offices, training departments, and its New York City reservations unit. This was in addition to the company's main headquarters in the Chrysler Building in Manhattan, and a Central Receiving Depot on Van Dam Street near Sunnyside. The building would become known as the "Pan Am Building" or "PAA Building", while the company referred to it as the "Long Island City Building" or "Queens Plaza Building". The "Skyline Room" or "Skytop Roof" on the ninth floor was opened on February 21, 1947.

On October 21, 1948, Pan Am debuted an automatic communications network developed by AT&T Long Lines, to improve ticket transactions between multiple airports. The central "nerve center" for the system was a telephone exchange in the Long Island City building. By September 1951, most of the Atlantic Division offices of Pan Am were relocated from LaGuardia Airport to the Long Island City building, with others moved to Idlewild Airport (now JFK Airport). In 1952, Pan American announced a project to create a seven-story addition to the back of the building, adding 50,000 square feet (4,600 m^{2}) of space and an interior parking garage. The original structure would also be modernized, and the exterior facade would be cleaned.

=== City operations ===
In 1963, the City of New York began negotiating to lease space in the Pan Am Building for the Bureau of Buildings, Design and Construction of the Board of Education. In April 1963, Pan Am began vacating the Long Island City building, moving operations to their new corporate headquarters (now the MetLife Building) on 45th Street in Midtown Manhattan. In August 1963, it was announced that the city Department of Traffic would move into the Long Island City building, along with the Board of Education's design and construction division and division of maintenance and operation.

The city agencies moved into the building in February 1964. The Board of Education divisions relocated from 42-15 Crescent Street on the south side of Queens Plaza, taking up the second through sixth floors in the building. The Traffic Department, relocating from 100 Gold Street in Lower Manhattan, would occupy the seventh and eighth floors. In September 1964, the New York City Board of Estimate approved a ten-year lease of space in the Pan Am Building for both agencies.

On December 17, 1964, what is now the Traffic Management Center was opened as part of a new citywide computerized traffic monitoring system. The center included a UNIVAC 1004 card processor computer. In 1974, the building was purchased by the city for $5.25 million. It was determined to be less expensive to acquire the building outright rather than continue leasing it.
