= Greater Astoria Historical Society =

Cultural and historical organization in Queens, New York

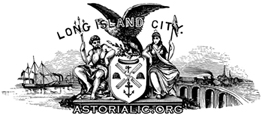
- Long Island City Coat of Arms
- Formation: 1985
- Type: Historical society
- Headquarters: Quinn Memorial Building
- Location: Queens, NY, U.S.
- President: Richard Melnick
- Website: astorialic.org

The Greater Astoria Historical Society (GAHS) is a non-profit cultural and historical organization located in the Astoria neighborhood of Queens, New York, United States. It is dedicated to preserving the past and promoting the future of the neighborhoods that are part of historic Long Island City, including the Village of Astoria, Blissville, Bowery Bay, Dutch Kills, Hunters Point, Ravenswood, Steinway Village, and Sunnyside.

== Mission ==
The mission of the Greater Astoria Historical Society, founded in 1985, is to discover, procure and preserve the history of historic Long Island City, which was incorporated into the City of Greater New York in 1898. In a borough well known for its diverse population (some 138 languages are spoken in Queens), the Long Island City / Astoria area is home to more than 350,000 people. A primary goal of the GAHS is to foster a positive sense of community pride and identity through an understanding of history for all residents, both newly arrived immigrants and longtime residents.

== Programs ==
The Greater Astoria Historical Society's “Long Island City Forum” is a multi-faceted program that includes lectures, video presentations, walking tours, exhibits and programs designed for local schools to increase awareness of Long Island City history. Regular tours include the East River and the piano factory Steinway & Sons. The Greater Astoria Historical Society sponsors an annual Haunted Waters Walking Tour along the East River in Long Island City as part of the Socrates Sculpture Park's Halloween Harvest Festival. The Greater Astoria Historical Society's most recent program, the Winged Fist Project, is dedicated to preserving the legacy of the Irish American Athletic Club, an amateur athletic organization that was active in Long Island City in the first two decades of the 20th century.

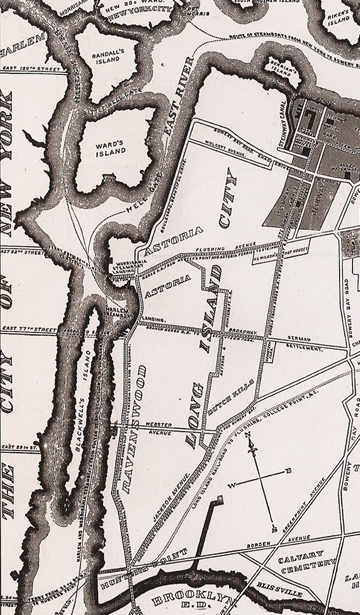
Detail of 1896 map of Long Island City.

=== Preservation ===
When possible, the Greater Astoria Historical Society attempts to acquire and preserve artifacts of historical significance to Queens. The GAHS played an important role "in saving the cornerstone of Congregation Mishkan Israel, the third oldest temple in Queens. It had been sitting near (a sidewalk in Queens) until a Greek American, George Stamatiades, and others helped to get a hearse from Quinn's funeral home, whose historical background is Irish Catholic, to save the synagogue stone," and relocate it to the Greater Astoria Historical Society. They also lobbied the city EDC to preserve the Dutch Kills Millstones.

=== Collections ===
The holdings of the Greater Astoria Historical Society, on loan and owned, include a collection of rare and unusual items available for public perusal. The GAHS maintains a Library/Research Center that contains over 10,000 items, including books and publications on local history, a photographic record of the community, and neighborhood ephemera and memorabilia. The GAHS holdings include dozens of antiquarian atlases and thousands of historic maps of Queens and surrounding areas from the now defunct Belcher Hyde map company among others. The holdings also include an almost complete run (or the morgue file) of the Long Island Star Journal, "a daily paper that informed the community about local and world news until it folded in 1968. A banner across the Star-Journal masthead reminded readers that the newspaper's name came from the merger of the Long Island Daily Star (1876) and the North Shore Daily Journal—The Flushing Journal (1841)."

=== Historic preservation ===
The Greater Astoria Historical Society actively solicits the donation of photographic images related to Queens history. The GAHS holdings include thousands of black and white photographs, photographic slides, glass negatives and tintypes and include the works of notable Queens historians Vincent F. Seyfried and Frank Carrado, informally known as the "Mayor of Long Island City." The GAHS has published hundreds of these photos in their books, and has scanned thousands of images. More than 3,000 of these images are available online through the Astoria History Project. The GAHS also has an extensive collection of images relating to the history of the East River.

The Greater Astoria Historical Society has a historical plaque program, which designates noteworthy locations in Queens. The GAHS has erected a plaque on the apartment building at 43-30 46th Street, in Sunnyside, Queens, where legendary jazz musician Bix Beiderbecke, "the remote and mysterious jazz cornettist... died in obscurity."

In collaboration with local historians, the Greater Astoria Historical Society has authored or co-authored four books on the history of Queens: Long Island City, Postcards of Long Island City, The East River, and The Queensboro Bridge. The GAHS has also published a free map that includes popular walking tours along the East River in Queens. The GAHS also compiles a weekly column for the Queens Gazette, summarizing historical articles from the Long Island Star Journal, a newspaper that chronicled life in Queens, from the 1840s until 1968.

== Facilities ==
The Greater Astoria Historical Society offices in the historic Quinn Memorial Building on the corner of Broadway and 36th Street in Astoria include a 2,000-square-foot (190 m^{2}) exhibit space for both permanent and rotating exhibits of topical interest to the community. The GAHS, which is affiliated with the Queens Tourism Council, maintains a tourist information booth outside its office and provides free maps and pamphlets to visitors looking to explore the history of Queens. A number of community groups use the Greater Astoria Historical Society offices for meetings, including; Astoria Music Society, Astoria Performing Arts Center, Central Astoria Development Coalition, Greenshores New York, Queens Council on the Arts, and Transportation Alternatives.

== See also ==
- List of historical societies in New York (state)
