= Academy of American Studies =

Public school in New York City

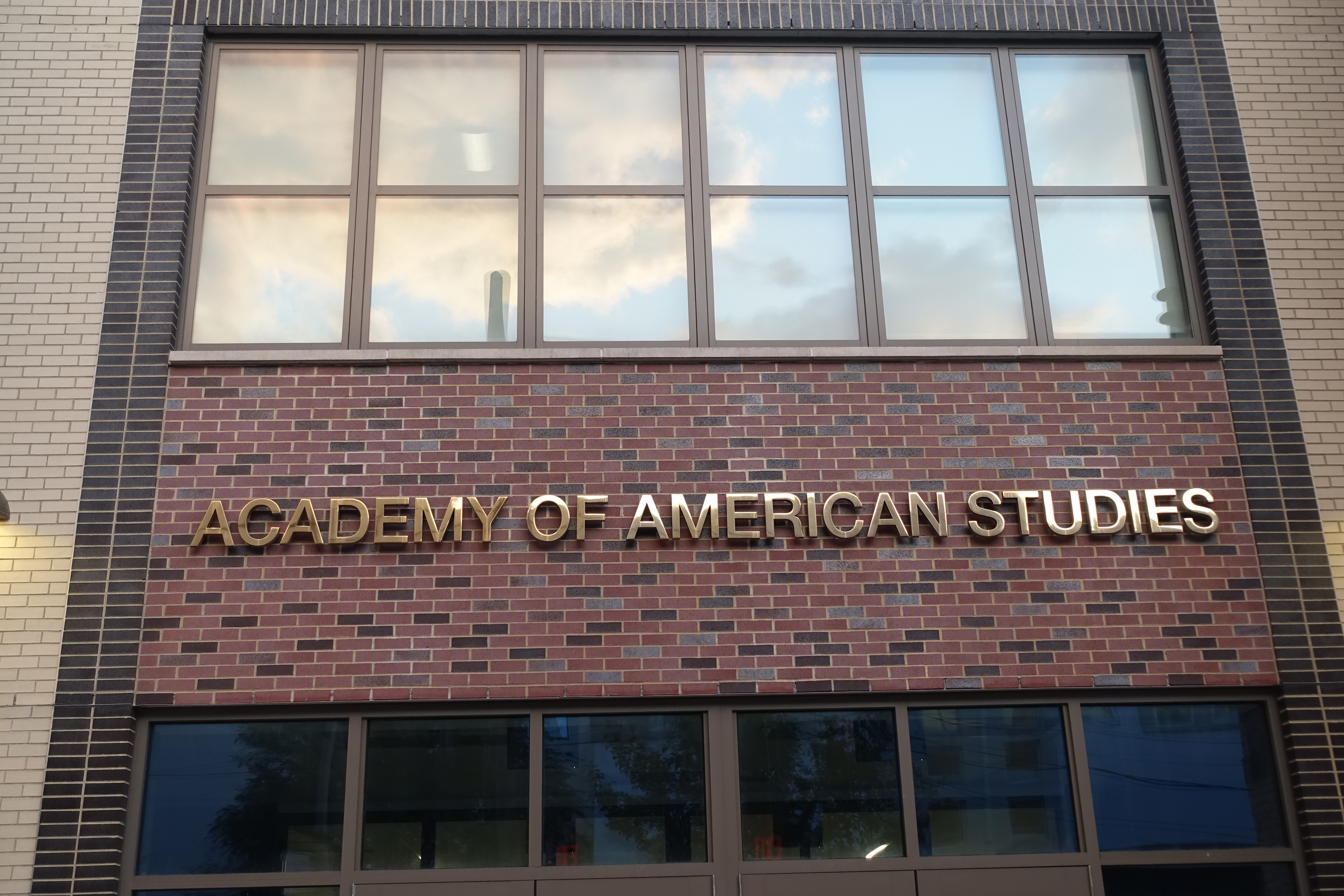

Location
- 40-11 28th Street; Long Island City, New York; United States

Information
- Type: Selective public high school
- Established: 1996
- Principal: Shermila Bharat
- Faculty: 36.4 FTEs
- Grades: 9–12
- Enrollment: 1,200 (2021-2022)
- Student to teacher ratio: 24.1:1
- Nickname: Academy Eagles
- Newspaper: The Academy Gazette
- Yearbook: "Americana"
- Website: www.academyofamericanstudies.com

The Academy of American Studies is a public high school in Long Island City, Queens, New York, which was founded in 1996 by the New York City Board of Education and the Gilder Lehrman Institute of American History. In June 2022, the school had approximately 1,200 students.

The school gives preference to Queens applicants in the admissions process through a priority system, and it is not to be confused with the High School of American Studies at Lehman College, a specialized high school in the Bronx. The Academy of American Studies is a semi-screened school; it selectively approves applicants but does not require students to take the SHSAT for admission.

The school was moved into a new building in February 2022.

== History and background ==
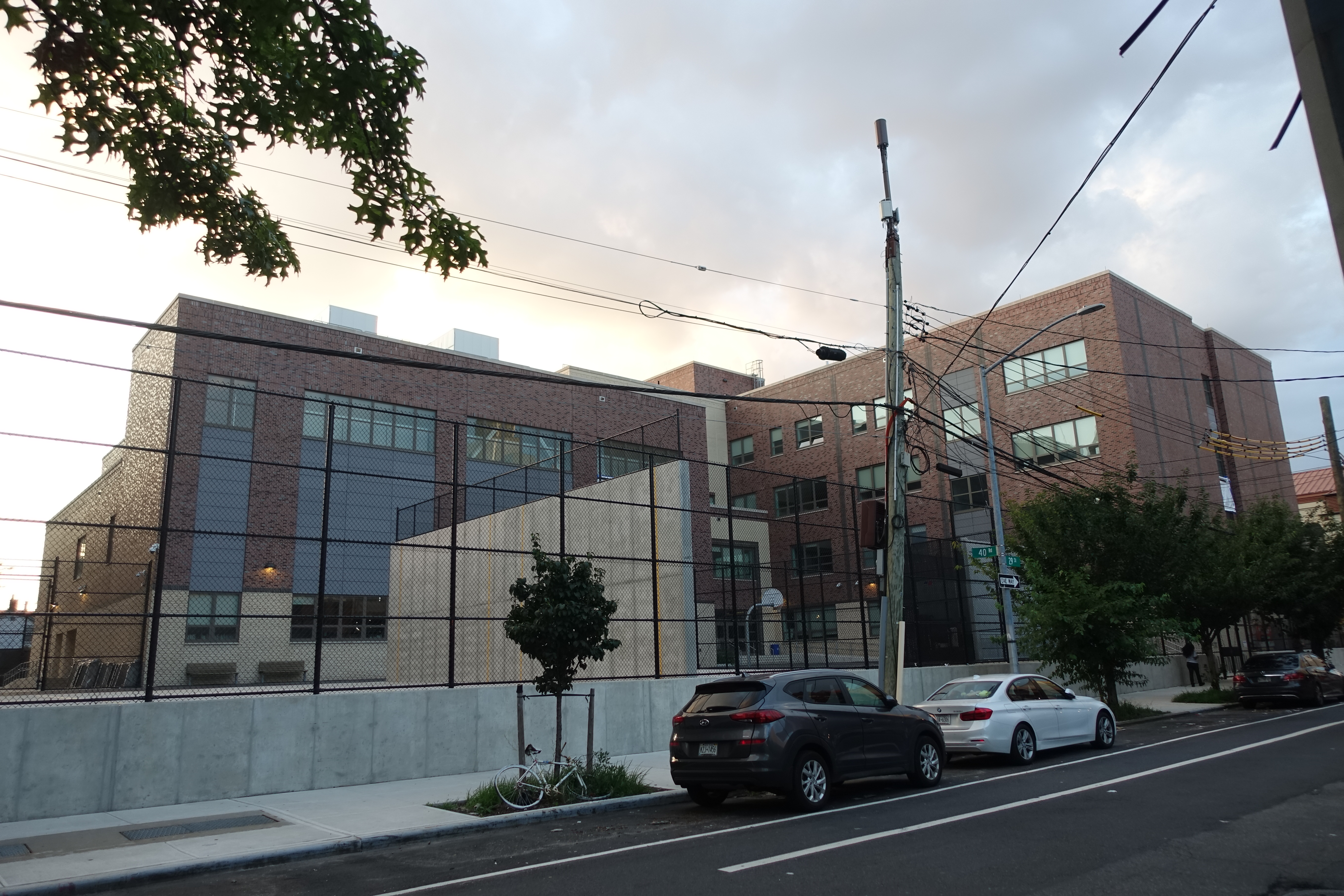
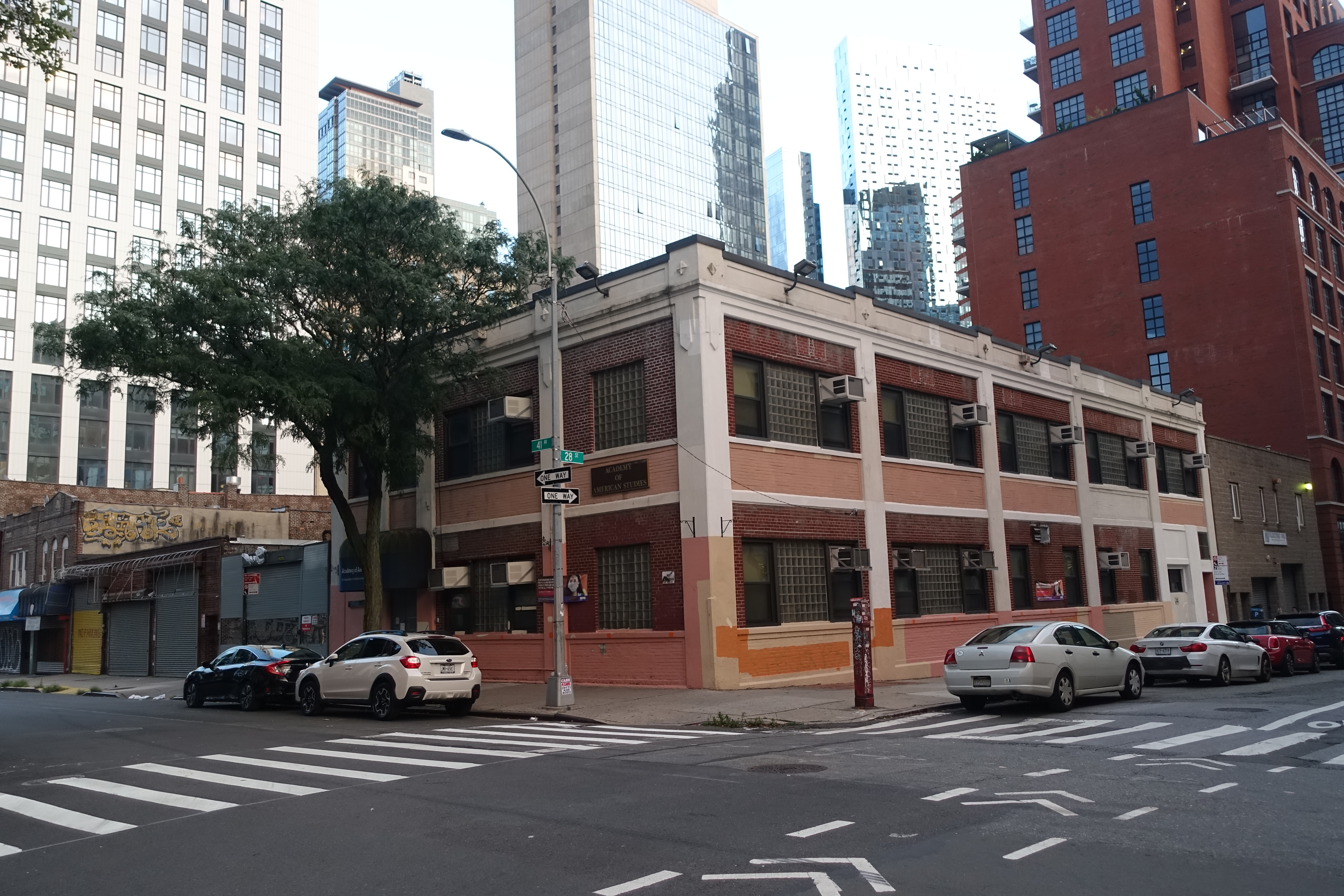
The new building opened in 2022 (top), and the annex building (bottom).

The Academy of American Studies opened in September 1996 as a collaboration between the Gilder Lehrman Institute and the New York City Board of Education. This school is the first Gilder Lehrman sponsored school in the United States. The Academy of American Studies' founding principal was the late Michael Serber, who assumed a post at the Gilder Lehrman Institute after his retirement in 2001. He was succeeded by the late Ellen Sherman who was principal until her retirement in 2011. William Bassell became principal following Ellen Sherman.

On October 12, 2006, the Academy of American Studies celebrated its tenth anniversary.

In 2016, a twentieth anniversary celebration was held, bringing together current and past staff and students.

Prior to the opening of the current building, the school shared space between Newcomers High School, and a converted annex building across the street. In 2017, the Department of Education announced a new building for the school, to be constructed on the parking lot behind Newcomers High School and opened in September 2021. A groundbreaking ceremony was held on December 3, 2018. The new building consists of lockers for all students, science and technology labs, a full-sized library, 30 standard classrooms, a music room, an art studio, a state-regulation sized gymnasium, and expanded office space. The outdoor areas include 2 handball courts, a 1/2 sized basketball court, and a reading area. The new building is four stories high, with a basement housing the cafeteria and music room. The new building was opened on February 28, 2022.

Over the past decade, interest in the school grew. After 2020, the school received an uptick in applications resulting in overcrowding of the previous building.

The school offers 10 AP courses, nine College Now classes and a College Advantage course.

The school has 12 PSAL sports teams.

In addition to the program of international trips, students participate in trips related to American history, including visits to Philadelphia, Gettysburg, Boston, Plymouth, and Washington, D.C. Additionally, classes are encouraged to take trips throughout New York City to museums, theatres, operas, ballets, and symphonies.

== Curriculum ==
Students take four years of American history, including enriched courses in American History in 9th and 10th grades, law, and Senior Thesis/Civics in eleventh and twelfth grade in addition to the courses required by New York State. Advanced Placement classes include AP European History, AP American History, AP Government and Politics, AP Macroeconomics, and AP Human Geography.

Advanced courses abound, including College Biology, AP Environmental Science, College Now Physics, College Now Chemistry, College Now Statistics, AP Calculus, and High School Calculus.

English at the school includes AP English Literature and AP English Language, as well as a series of courses across all four grades which include writing as preparation for college and a reading list which modern works.

World Languages offered are French and Spanish.

AP courses are offered in many subjects, including: AP Calculus, AP Biology, AP Environmental Science, AP US History, AP European History, AP Macroeconomics, AP Human Geography, AP English Literature, AP English Language, AP Spanish Language, AP Spanish Literature, and AP US Government and Politics.

The school also offers arts classes, which include Playwriting/Acting, Studio Art, Digital Media, Studio Are, College Now Art History and Opera Appreciation (in which students attend dress rehearsals at the Metropolitan Opera six times a year). In the 2022–2023 school year, the academy is finalizing the Band/Orchestra and Chorus classes.

Academy of American Studies offers an ENL program for approximately 40 English Language Learners and a full ICT program for approximately 120 students with IEP's. The school's total enrollment is approximately 1200.

== Extracurricular activities ==
The school is home to sports teams and clubs, a school newspaper, and an active student government.

Student government The student government is the center of planning many events and activities, as well as providing a voice for the student population in making progressive changes to the "culture and climate" of the school environment. They meet regularly with their advisor and monthly with the principal.

Planning and running school events and activities are this organization's chief duties. They annually plan Talent Shows and two Pep Rallies along with spirit days, school dances and other fun-unique events. For policy changes, four Student Government Representatives sit on the Principal's Consultative Council which is a monthly meeting with the Principal to discuss current issues. Also, two Representatives sit on the School Leadership Team.

Eagles in the Morning Eagles in the Morning is the academy "Radio Show" that takes place during the attendance taking period. Members of student government make key announcements every day.

The Academy Gazette The Academy Gazette is the school newspaper which is published on a seasonal basis. Students with an interest in journalism and photography are encouraged to write for the newspaper which features special interest sections as well as a sports and editorial section.

Sports The academy features seven sports teams part of the Public Schools Athletic League (PSAL).

- Boys Baseball Varsity Eagles
- Boys Basketball Varsity Eagles
- Boys Varsity Bowling Eagles (Co-ed)
- Boys Volleyball Varsity Eagles
- Girls Basketball Varsity Lady Eagles
- Girls Softball Varsity Lady Eagles
- Girls Volleyball Varsity Lady Eagles
- Girls Football Varsity Lady Eagles
- Boys varsity and Junior Varsity Cross Country team
- Girls Varsity and junior Varsity Cross country team
- Girls stunt team
- Girls flag football team

Clubs The ethic and interest clubs in the school include the Debate Team, Amnesty International, Literary Magazine, Academy Gazette (school newspaper), Multicultural Club, National History Day Club, Model UN, National Honor Society, SADD, Senior Committee. . Through the National History club, students are able to enter New York City's annual National History Day Competition.

== Enrollment process ==
The Academy of American Studies participates in the NYCDOE's high school admissions process. Students apply through either or both of the school's programs, and admission assignments are made by the DOE. The screened program is based on academic achievement (a combination of State tests and course grades), and students are ranked in order of their academic achievement. The Education Option program is similar, except that students are placed in the top, middle, and bottom thirds of achievement citywide, and assignments are made randomly from each of those groups.

== Notable alumni ==
- Jessica Ramos (2003), New York State Senator
