= Dutch Kills Millstones =

Set of millstones in Queens, New York, U.S.

The Dutch Kills Millstones are a set of millstones in Queens, New York City.

Constructed by Burger Jorissen in 1650, Jorrisen's Mill was the first tidal mill in western Queens. It operated using a ditch known as Berger's Sluice, which ran just east of Northern Boulevard between 40th Road and 48th Street. For decades, a pair of centuries-old millstones, once used to grind wheat, have been embedded in a traffic triangle at Queens Plaza, where Northern and Queens Boulevards intersect and two major elevated New York City Subway lines converge. The labor-intensive tasks of grinding wheat and sifting flour were predominantly carried out by African-American workers. It is very likely that some of the 163 African American slaves known to have been held in Newtown in 1755 were employed in operating these millstones.

== Early history ==
Since 1631, tide-powered water mills in Boston, New England, and New York have been essential for grinding grain, cutting lumber, grinding spices, making snuff, pounding iron, and performing numerous other heavy labor tasks that contributed to America's development. These “tide-mills” also supported maritime commerce, connecting emerging metropolitan centers along the Atlantic Coast. In New York, these mills were an economic boon that propelled the city to greatness—a fact commemorated by the two flour barrels on the city's coat of arms. The mill at Dutch Kills in Long Island City, New York was the first in western Queens.

Seal of New York City

The LIRR expansion caused the gristmill to be destroyed in 1861, the last vestiges of the mill are the stones Jorrisen installed in 1657. These millstones are linked to the Grist Mill in the first European community in Queens, located in what was and still is known as Dutch Kills. The Payntar Millstones are significant beyond making flour for Washington's Continental Army; they are a tangible link to early U.S. industrial history.

The mill's ownership can be traced through several families: Bragaw, Parcell, Polhemus and Ryerson, before being acquired by the Payntar family in 1831. The mill and its pond remained until 1861, when the Long Island Railroad's construction obliterated the site.

The Payntar family salvaged the millstones and placed them in front of their home on Jackson Avenue, approximately 300 feet north of Queens Plaza.

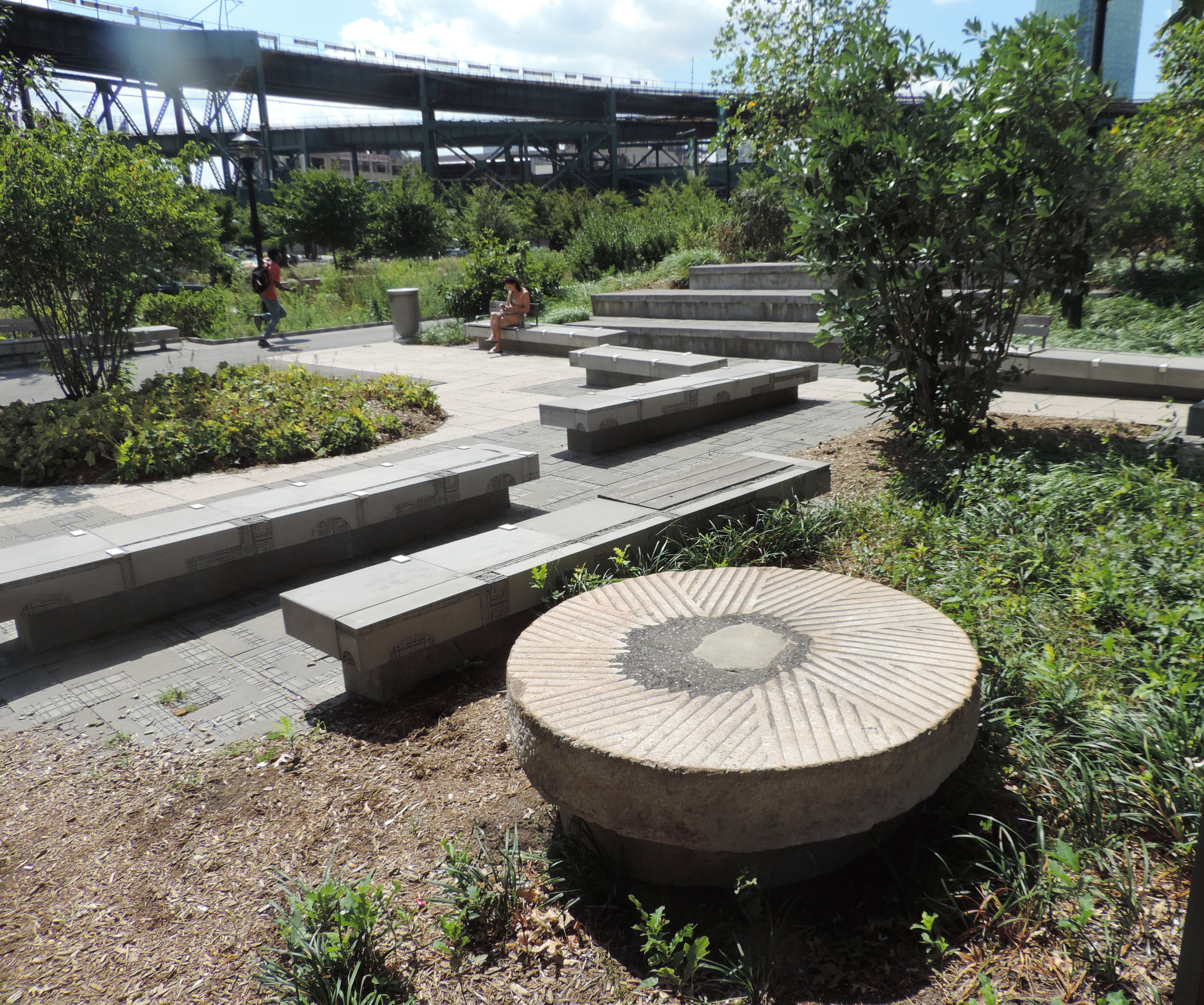
The millstones, returned to Dutch Kills Green in the 2014 renovation

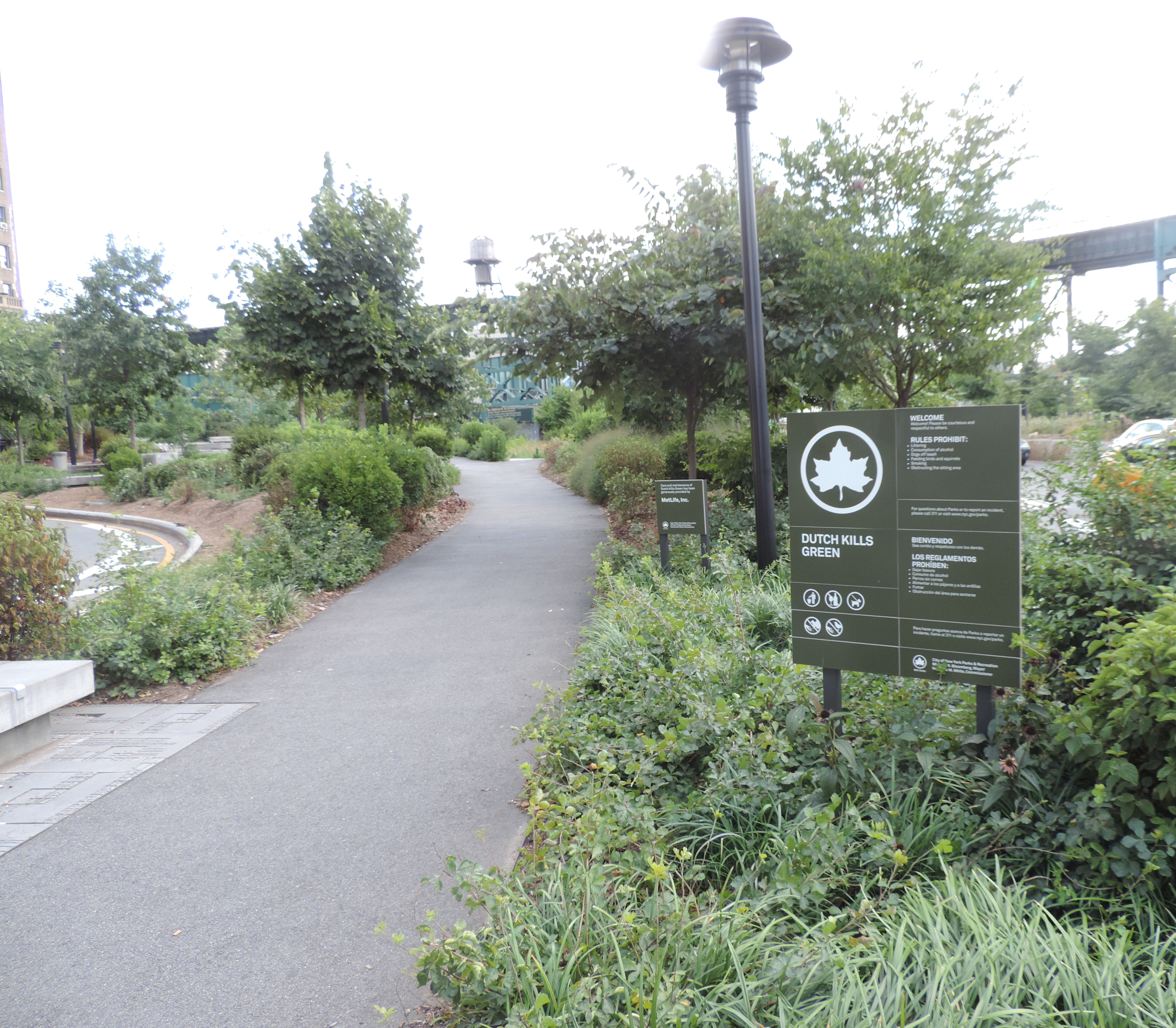
Park in eastern part of plaza, after renovation

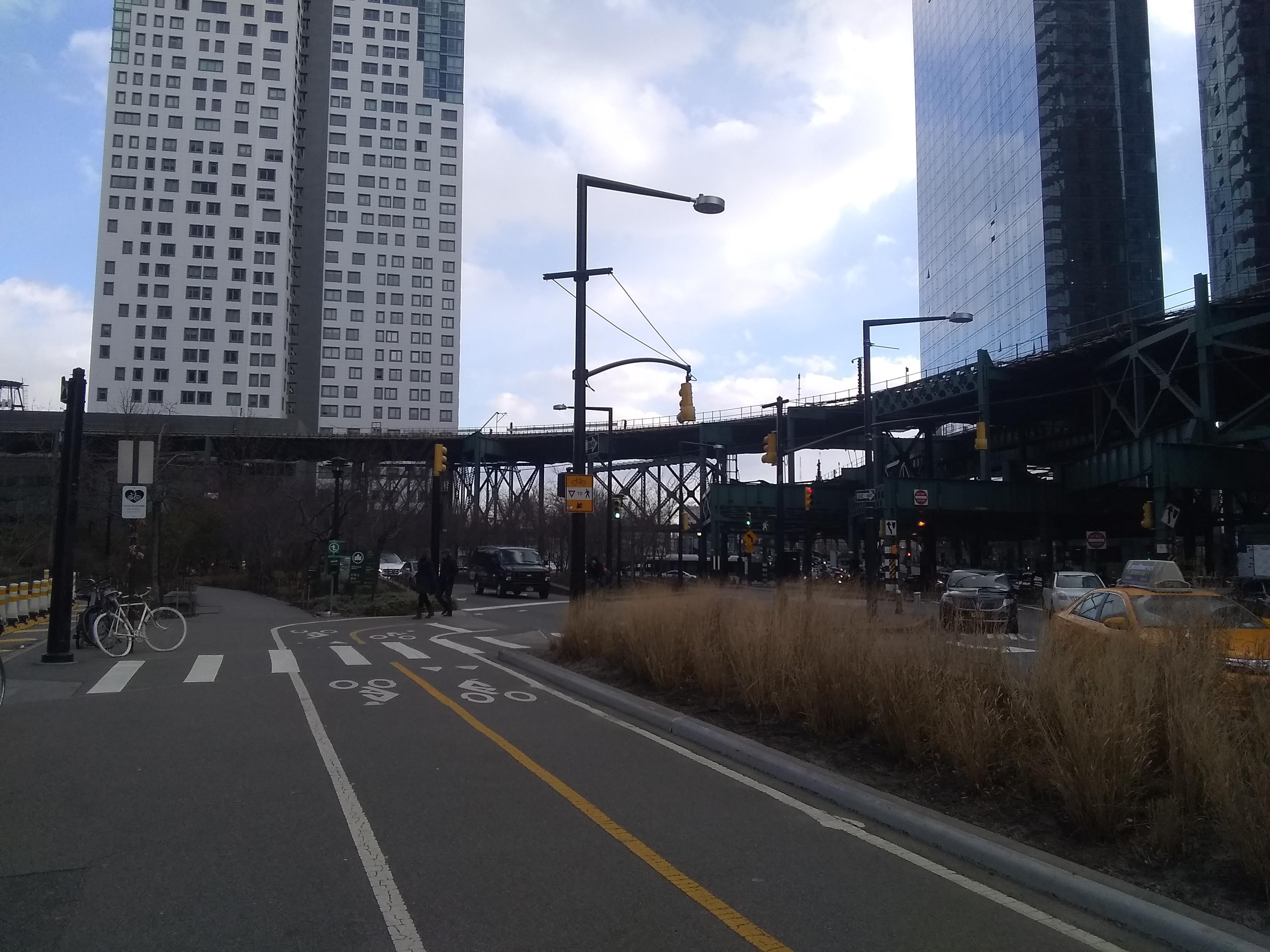
Bike lane in Queens Plaza after renovation

== 20th century ==
Map of Long Island City, Queens Co. N.Y. - Paynter Ave shown

When the Payntar home was demolished in 1913, the millstones were moved to the plaza in front of the Long Island Savings Bank at 41st Avenue and Queens Plaza North. A postcard from around 1925 depicts tall light fixtures with circular bases resembling the millstones. 40th Avenue was once called Paynter Ave. During the construction of the Queens Plaza subway station around 1930, the stones were temporarily relocated to a nearby flower bed. A 1940s booklet by the Long Island Savings Bank shows the millstones embedded in a traffic island, where they remained until the 2000s.

For the next 15 years, the local historical society monitored the millstones, noting significant deterioration due to vandalism and exposure to the elements. The centers of the stones have eroded, with one stone cracked and asphalt dumped into them. Concerns about their condition were raised as early as 2001.

As part of a multimillion-dollar renovation of Queens Plaza by the NYC Planning and the New York City Economic Development Corporation, the millstones were to be moved to the center of the plaza and mounted on pedestals with four pins drilled through them. Their centers would be filled with grout. However, their new location, near a bike lane and in a congested traffic hub, raised concerns about safety and exposure to road salt and weathering. As a temporary measure due to public outcry, the millstones of Dutch Kills have been moved to the Ravenswood library.

== Historical significance ==
Though the New York City Landmarks Preservation Commission has declined to designate the millstones as landmarks., the millstones are considered the oldest surviving European artifacts in the borough. Lore was they arrived on a West Indian merchant ship. The design on their faces suggests they are either replacements or originals with their faces re-scored, dating to the early 19th century. However; Historian Theodore Hazen, a millstone expert, confirmed that the Jorissen Tide Mill millstones in Dutch Kills, western Long Island, were indeed Esopus Millstones made from Shawangunk Conglomerate sourced from the ‘Gunks’ above the Rochester-Accord area in New York.

The Greater Astoria Historical Society sought support to temporarily house the millstones in their museum, retain experts to study their origin and age, and exhibit them for the community until a permanent local interior space is found. The society, with the expertise to securely house the artifacts, would make them available for public viewing more frequently than alternative proposals. The millstones from Jorrisen's Mill are significant artifacts of New York's early industrial history. Their preservation in a secure environment, accompanied by interpretative and educational information, is essential for public understanding and appreciation.

It is uncommon for tide mill millstones to remain intact, as many have been shattered or destroyed over time. The association of these millstones with a 17th-century mill further enhances their rarity and historical value. The Jorrisen millstones are likely among the earliest tidal millstones preserved in the United States, and possibly in the Western Hemisphere.

The name "Dutch Kills" originates from the area's early Dutch colonial history and its geographical features. "Dutch" refers to the Dutch settlers who arrived in the region in the 17th century, particularly around 1642, when licenses were granted to Dutch citizens to settle in what is now Queens. The term "Kills" comes from the Dutch word "kill," meaning "little stream" or "creek." Specifically, Dutch Kills was named after a navigable tributary of Newtown Creek, which flowed through the area and was a significant feature of the landscape at the time.

This tributary, often referred to simply as "the Kill," ran roughly where Queensboro Plaza stands today. The settlement around this stream became known as Dutch Kills, reflecting both the Dutch presence and the waterway that defined it. Over time, the hamlet of Dutch Kills grew, serving as a key location during the American Revolutionary War and later evolving from a rural farming community into an industrial hub before being incorporated into Long Island City in 1870. The name persists today as a nod to its Dutch roots and the creek that once shaped the area.

== See also ==
- List of tide mills on Long Island
