= Queens Plaza (New York City) =

Plaza in Long Island City, Queens, New York

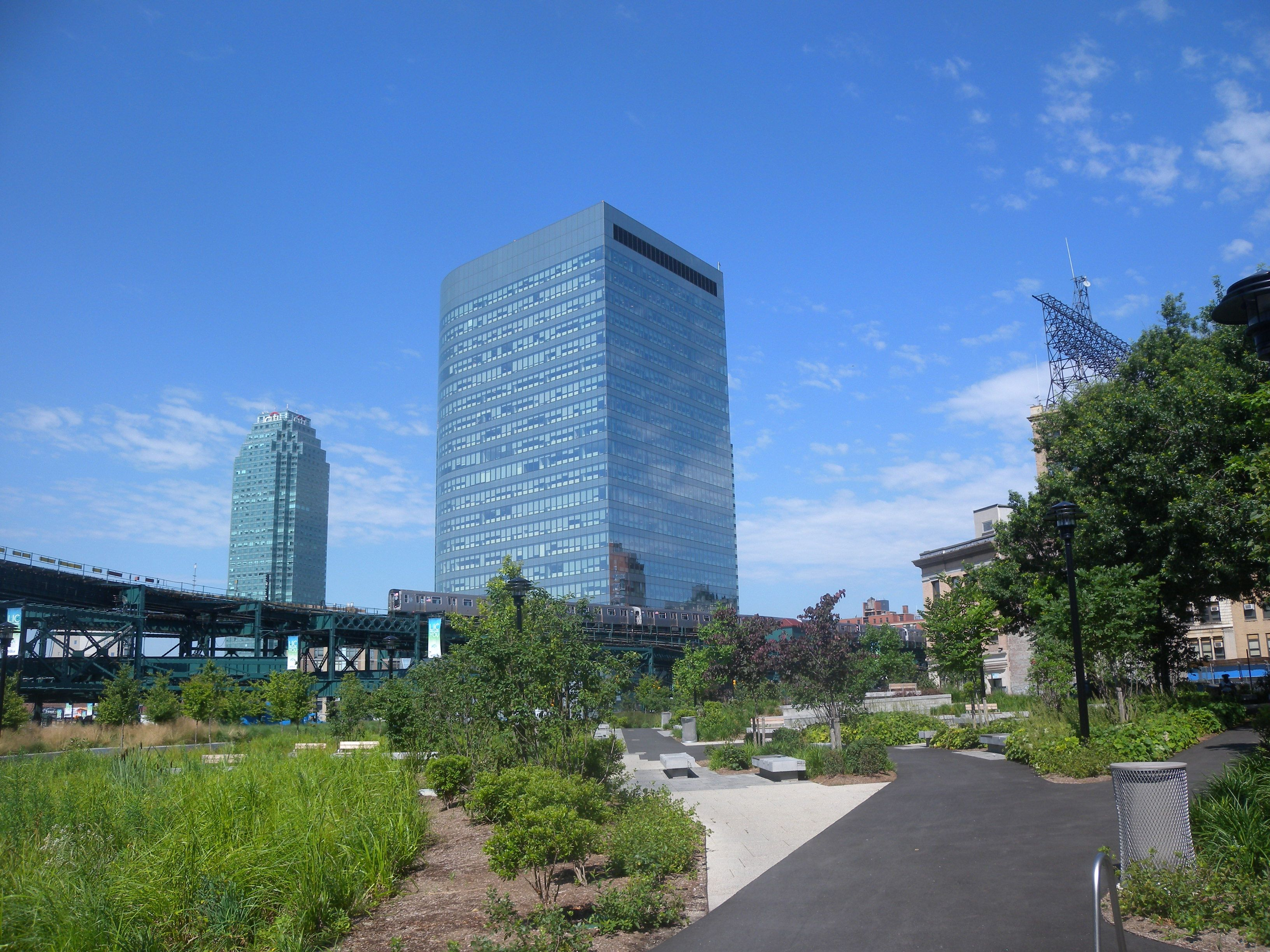
East end of the Plaza, showing the new Gotham Center office building

Queens Plaza is a plaza straddling the western end of Queens Boulevard in Long Island City, Queens, between 21st Street and Jackson Avenue/Northern Boulevard (NY 25A). The Queensboro Bridge starts near the middle of the plaza. It has a New York City Subway stop for the E, F, <F>, and R trains, the Queens Plaza station below ground along the eastern edge, and another stop for the 7, <7>, N and W trains, the Queensboro Plaza station above the west central part of the plaza on elevated tracks.

== History ==
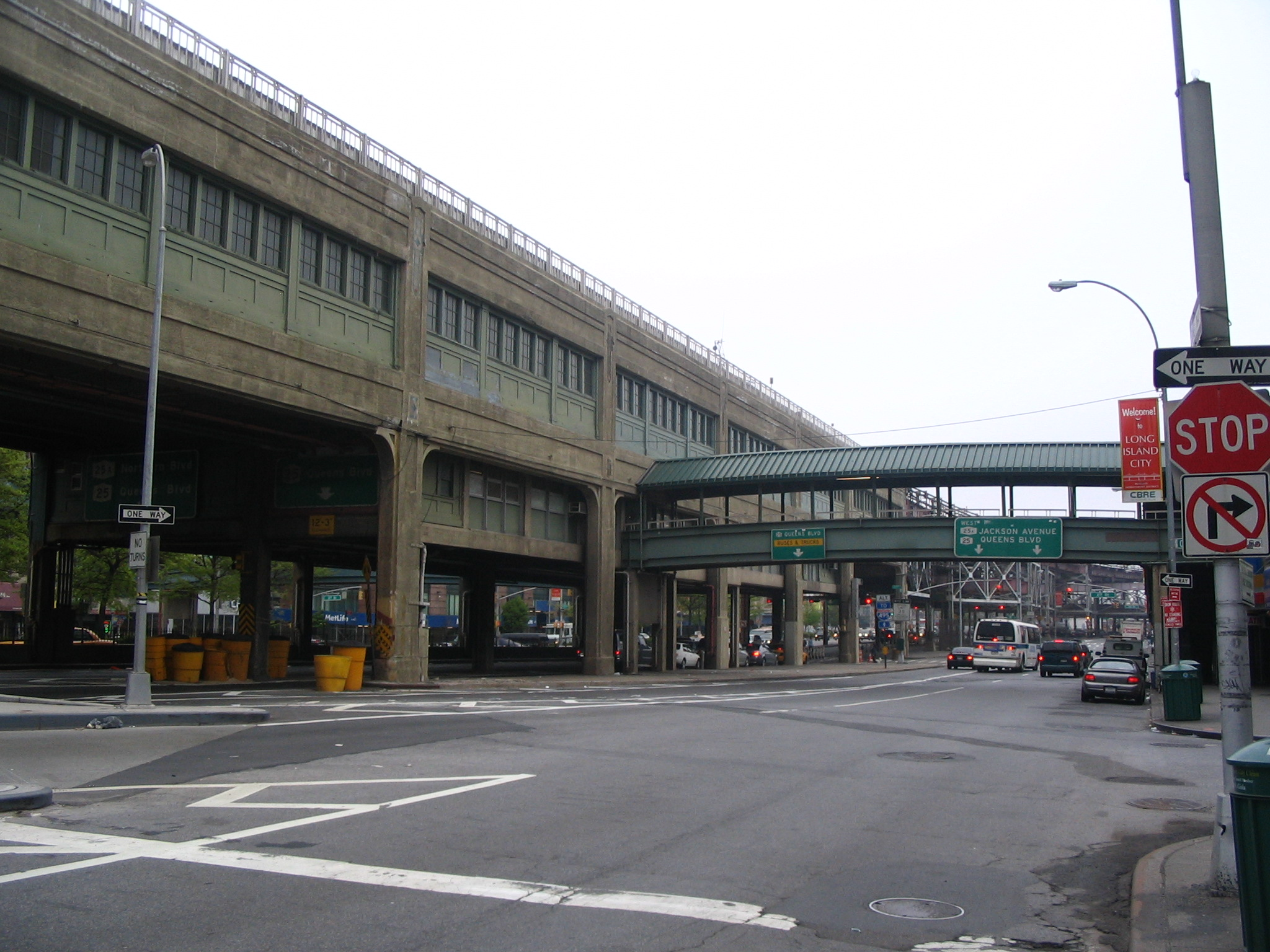
South side prior to renovation

The location was the center of the 18th century village of Dutch Kills; two millstones were preserved as relics of that time, to be displayed in a green space.

=== 20th century ===
The plaza itself was built to accommodate the connection of the Queensboro Bridge to Queens Boulevard, which opened in 1909. A street, named Jane Street, was widened by 90 feet (27 m) and was renamed Bridge Plaza North and South. Grassy medians, cut off at each intersection, divided the main and service lanes of the plaza. Sculptures made out of flowers and trees, including a 75 feet (23 m) "crescent with a Japanese cherry tree at its center", were prevalent. At the time, it was spacious, with only a few buildings on the sides and a solitary flagpole in the center of the plaza. Immediately to the southeast of the plaza was the Sunnyside Yard, a storage yard for the Pennsylvania Railroad (now NJ Transit Rail Operations). The addition of railroads and a bridge made Queens Plaza easily accessible from Manhattan. Queensboro Bridge Plaza or simply Bridge Plaza, as it was originally called, soon experienced an increase in real estate development.

By 1915, the bridge was overcrowded with traffic, and subway tracks were built above the plaza. The Queensboro Plaza station, a large two-level subway hub for the Brooklyn–Manhattan Transit Corporation and Interborough Rapid Transit Company, opened above Queens Plaza in 1916-1917. The construction of the Queensboro Plaza station necessitated the removal of Queens Plaza's landscaped medians. From the 1920s through World War II, Queens Plaza served as the location for many factories and warehouses, some of which later became office buildings, as well as a financial hub with several banks. The Brewster Building, a factory along the plaza, made horse-drawn carriages, Rolls-Royces and other cars, and the Brewster F2A Buffalo fighter plane. The Long Island Savings Bank, Silvercup Bakery and Chase Manhattan Bank Building also were built on the plaza. Other banks included the Corn Exchange Bank, First National City Bank, and Title Guarantee and Trust Company.

By 1928, 86,000 cars went through the Queensboro Bridge and onto the plaza each day. Queens Plaza came to be characterized as a "a new downtown", supplanting the Hunters Point section of Long Island City in that regard. In 1933, the Queens Plaza station, an underground subway station on the Independent Subway System's Queens Boulevard Line, opened at the southeast corner of the plaza.

In the 1970s, Queens Plaza became a place for drug dealers, pimps, and prostitutes to frequent, and was filled with trash, drugs, and broken glass. Later, "aging Chinese takeout restaurants, humid fried-chicken joints, sad-seeming doughnut shops, [and] the Queens Plaza Municipal Parking Garage, a brown concrete structure resembling a 1970's [sic] filmmaker's idea of an intergalactic battle station" opened along the plaza. Strip clubs appeared in the 1990s, around the time that rehabilitation of the plaza started to be considered.

=== 21st century ===
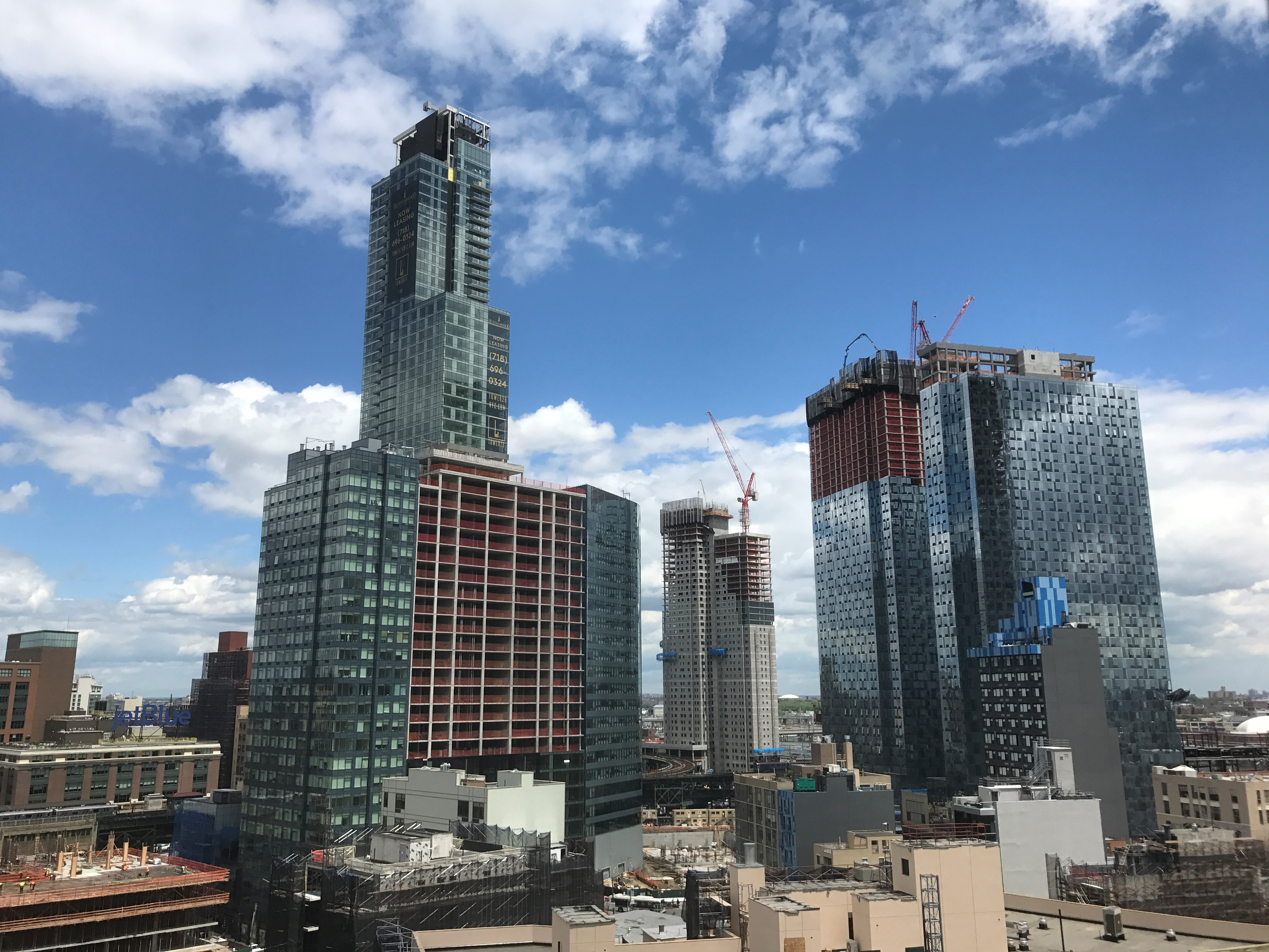
Skyline of Queens Plaza in May 2017

By the early 2000s, Long Island City was going through gentrification, and new buildings were being put up, especially around Queens Plaza. In 2001, the area was rezoned, and 2,500 of about 5,000 apartments were built or planned within two blocks of the plaza. City officials decided to clean up the plaza, since the area was being gentrified. In 2005, the U.S. Congress approved a measure to demolish the municipal parking lot and turn it into a 1.5-acre (6,100 m^{2}) park. In 2009, $75 million was earmarked to clean and spruce up the area and to renovate the plaza.

The renovation itself cost $45 million. It created a new public park within the plaza, on the former site of the municipal parking lot; the park was envisioned as an "urban oasis" or neighborhood meeting place. Another new public park, named Dutch Kills Green, was built as part of the renovation; it has 500 trees, wetlands, and pavers for storm drainage. It is right next to two new hotels: the 16-floor, 183-room Hilton Garden Inn, and a 31-floor, 160-room Marriott. New office buildings are also coming into the area. Even though the Metropolitan Life Insurance Company moved two-thirds of its employees from the Brewster Building on Queens Plaza North back to Manhattan in 2006 because of the distance and lack of restaurants in Queens Plaza, airline company JetBlue and advertising and public relations firm Publicis later moved into the same former factory. Real estate developer Tishman Speyer was also looking for tenants for its Queens Plaza South skyscraper, named 2 Gotham South.

While only 1,000 people lived on the streets immediately surrounding the plaza as of the 2000 United States census, the area has been undergoing substantial new development. About 4,700 new rental units in 25 new residential buildings were expected to be completed in the Queens Plaza area by around 2019, as it grows along with the rest of Long Island City.

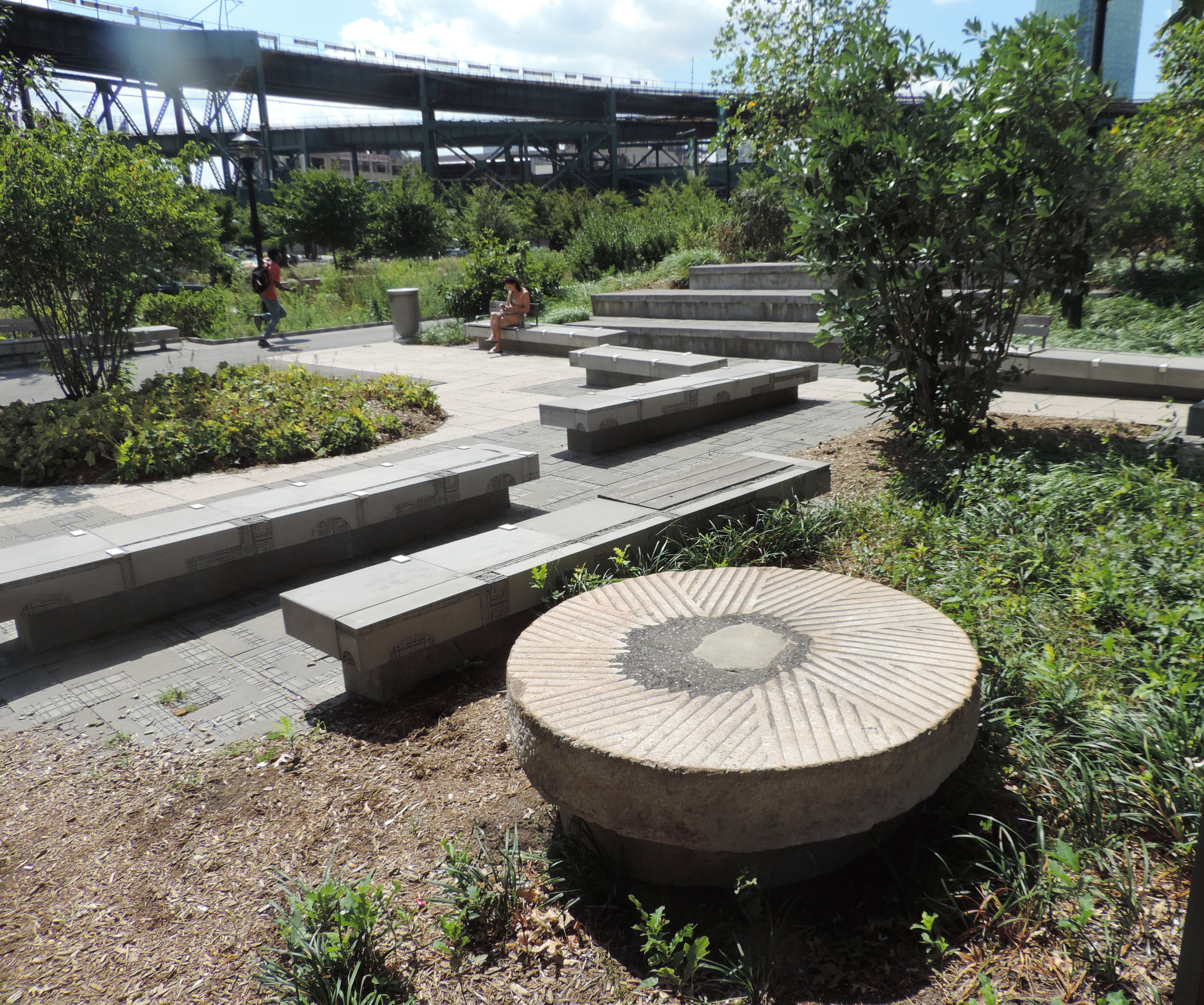
The millstones, returned to Dutch Kills Green in the 2014 renovation

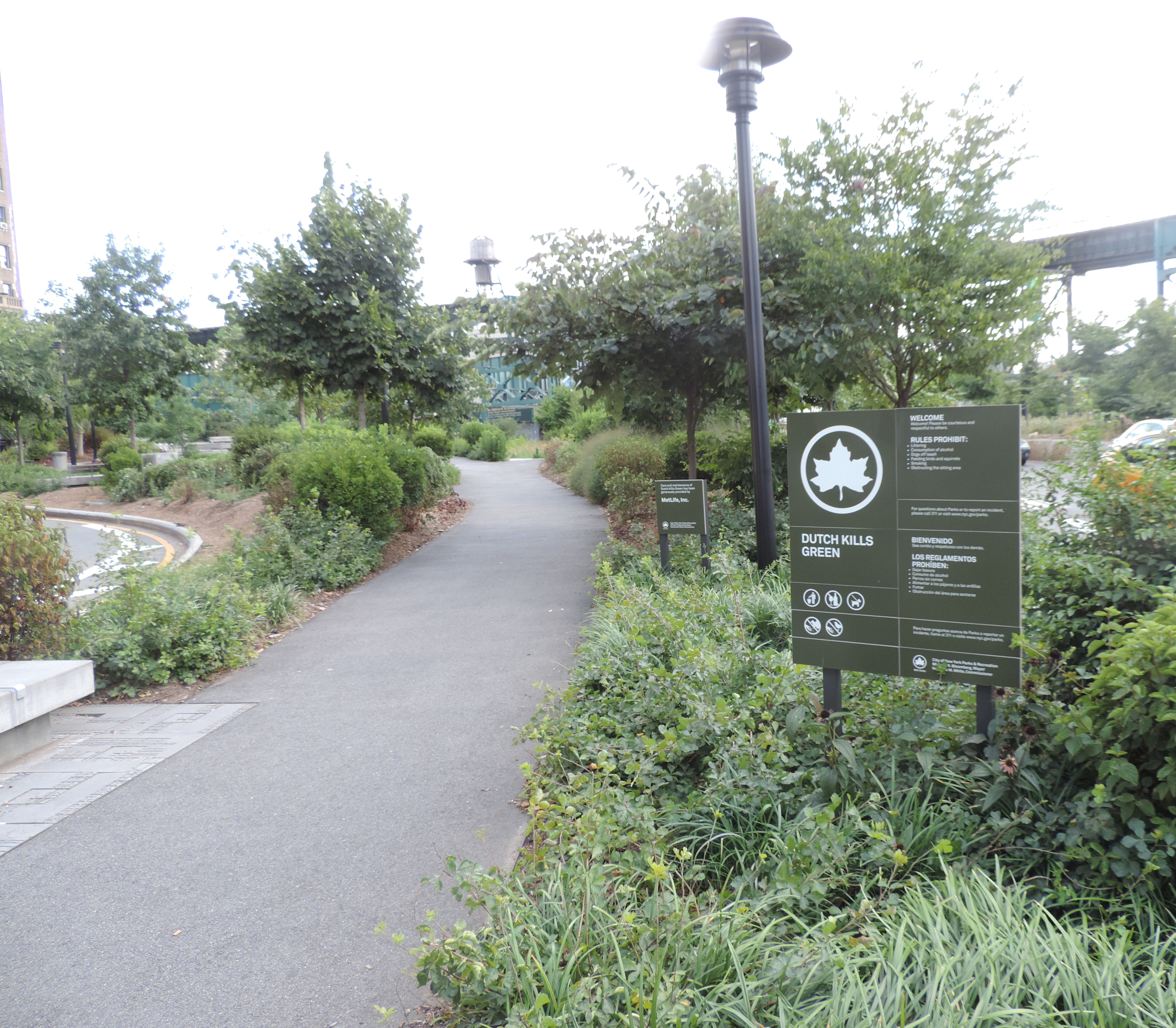
Park in eastern part of plaza, after renovation

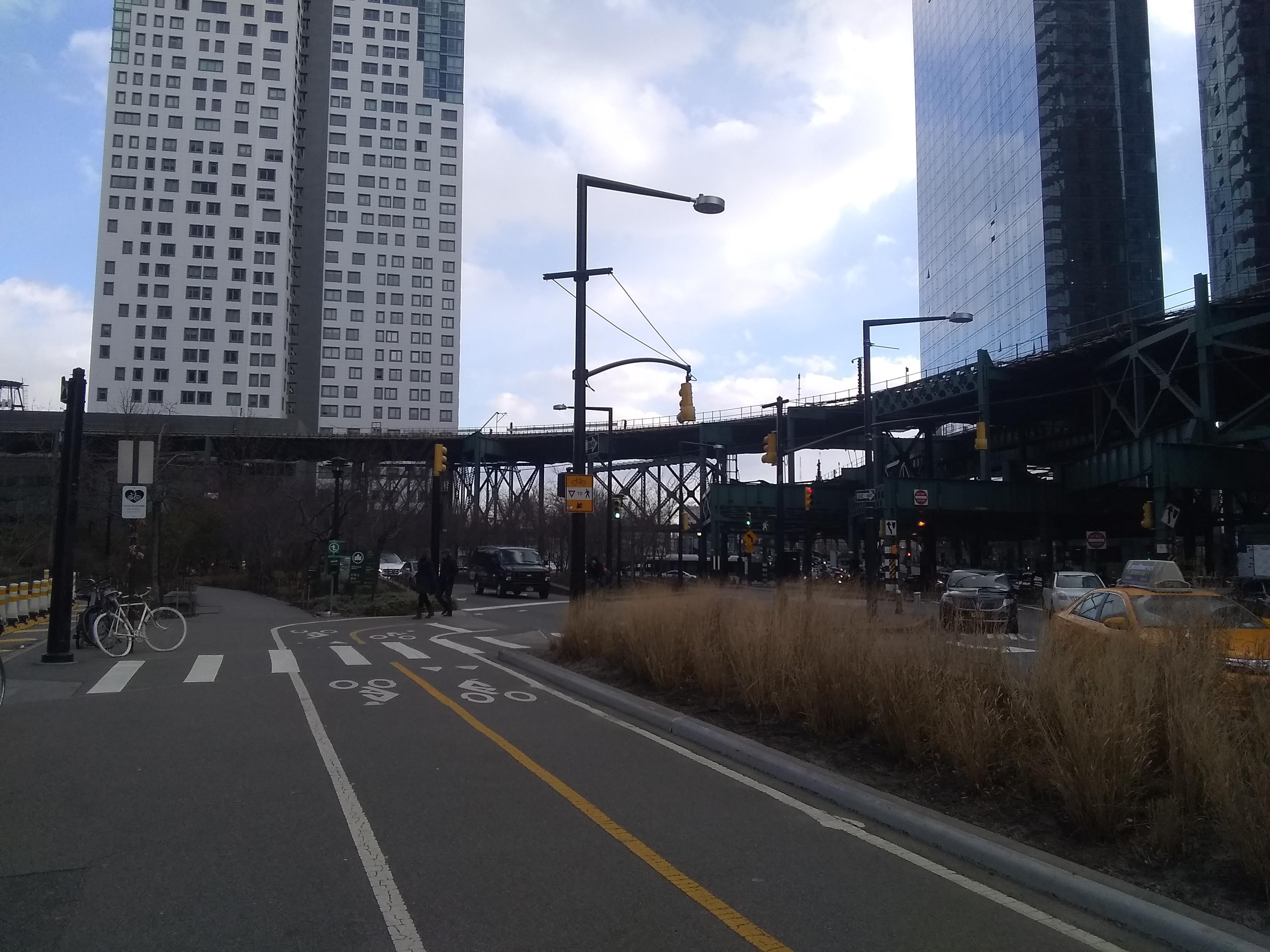
Bike lane in Queens Plaza after renovation

== Notable places ==
The New York City Traffic Control Center at 28-11 Queens Plaza North controls the city's traffic lights.

The Chase Manhattan Bank Building is a New York City designated landmark, having been given such a designation in 2015. Located at 29-27 41st Avenue, with one side facing Queens Plaza North, it was one of the most prominent buildings on Queens Plaza when it was completed in 1927.
