= Newcomers High School =

Public school in New York City

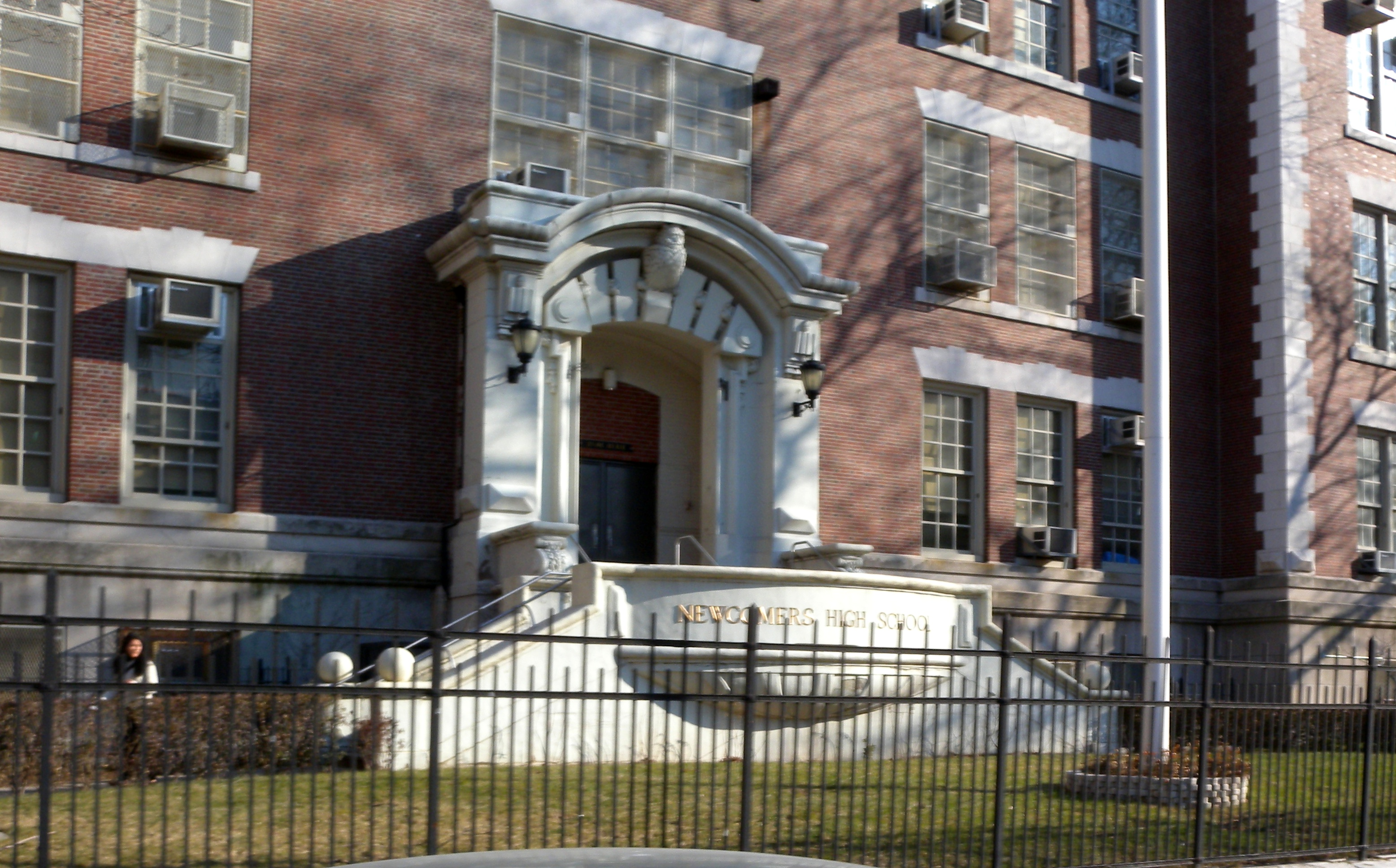

Location
- 28-01 41 Avenue; Long Island City, New York 11101; United States; 40°45′05″N 73°56′13″W

Information
- Established: September 1995; 31 years ago
- Principal: Lilliam Katcher
- Grades: 9–12
- Enrollment: 836 (2019–2020)
- Website: newcomershs.schoolwires.net

Newcomers High School (High School 555) is a high school located in Long Island City, Queens, New York City, United States. It opened in 1995 with Lourdes Burrows as its principal; Elizabeth Messmann is the most recent principal, and was appointed in 2020. This school specializes in introducing new immigrants to American culture, and also teaching English to students. In 2009, it was rated as #6 out of U.S. News & World Report's list of top 500 high schools in the U.S.—making it the highest-ranked school out of 12 New York City public schools on the top 500 list. The school is near the Queens Plaza (E, F, <F>, and R trains) and Queensboro Plaza (7, <7>, N and W trains) New York City Subway stations, as well as numerous MTA Bus/New York City Bus routes.

The school has 836 students as of the 2019–2020 school year. Of the students, 23% are Asian, 69% are Hispanic, 1% are Black, 5% are White, and 2% are Native American.

The school was renamed ATLAS (Arts, Technology, Language, Advocacy, and Social Justice) in 2024 in response to the principal and students' preference to move away from the "Newcomers" label and to expand its mission to be an option for all Queens students.

The school's athletic teams include boys basketball, girls basketball, boys handball, boys soccer, boys swimming, boys tennis, girls tennis, boys volleyball, girls volleyball, and co-ed cricket.

Extracurricular activities include chorus, concerts, GSA, hip-hop dance, human rights, international food festival, media/video, Model United Nations, multicultural show, new student orientation, orchestra, peer learning program, ping pong, SAT preparation, SAYA youth leadership program, science research club, stage production, student government, theater, tutoring, and yearbook program.
