= Queensboro Plaza station =

New York City Subway station in Queens

Queensboro Plaza
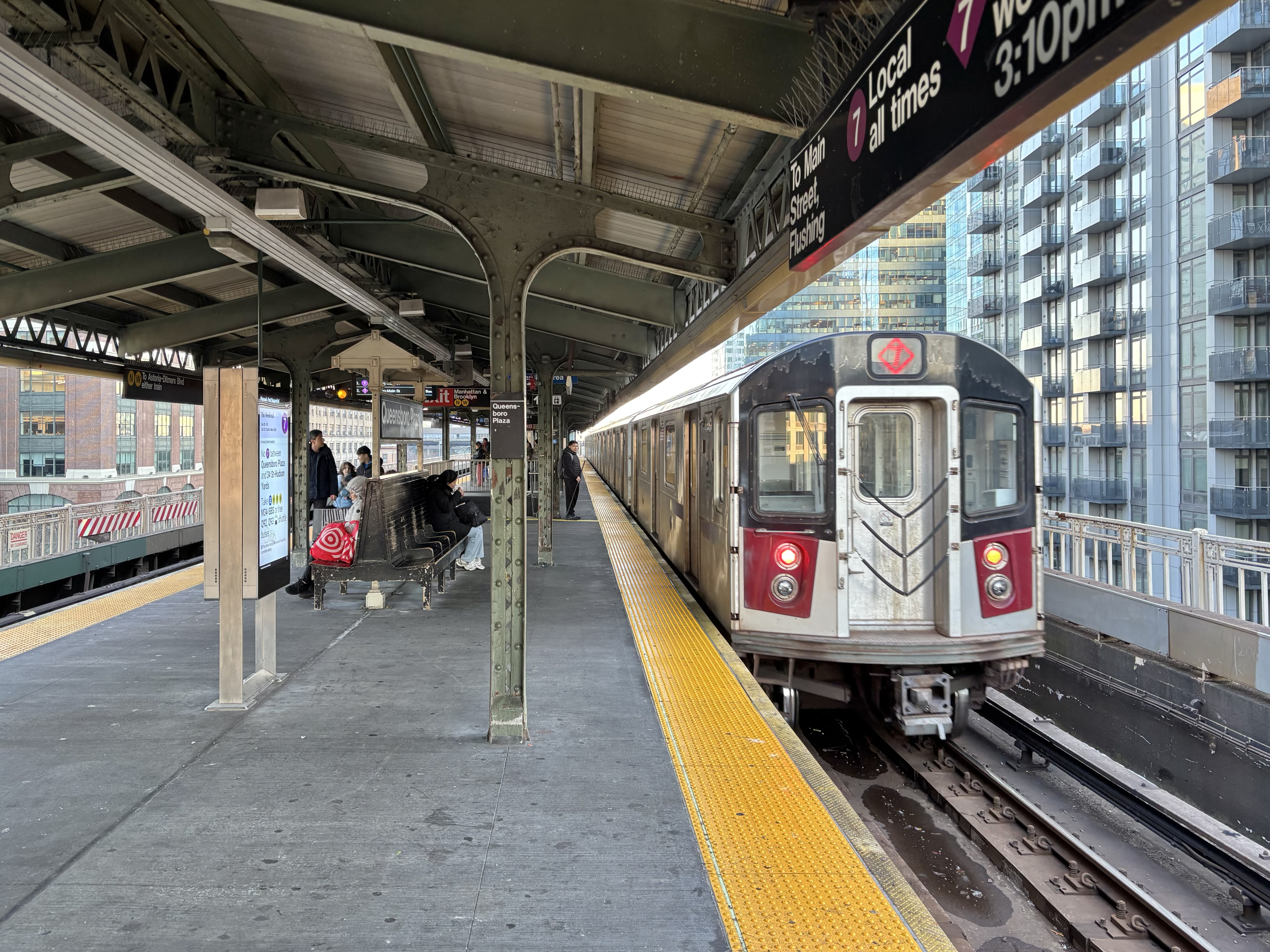
- R188 <7> train departing from the upper-level platform

Station statistics
- Address: 27th Street & Queens Plaza; Long Island City, New York
- Borough: Queens
- Locale: Long Island City
- Coordinates: 40°45′2.35″N 73°56′25.24″W
- Division: A (IRT), B (BMT)
- Line: BMT Astoria Line; IRT Flushing Line
- Services: 7 (all times) <7> (rush hours until 9:30 p.m., peak direction); N (all times); W (weekdays)
- Transit: NYCT Bus: Q39; MTA Bus: Q32, Q60, Q63, Q66, Q69, Q100, Q101, Q102
- Structure: Elevated
- Levels: 2
- Platforms: 2 island platforms (1 on each level) cross-platform interchange
- Tracks: 4 (2 on each level)

Other information
- Opened: November 16, 1916; 110 years ago (Flushing Line); February 1, 1917; 109 years ago (Astoria Line)
- Accessible: Yes
- Accessibility: Cross-platform transfer available

Traffic
- 2025: 3,508,362 ▲10.8%
- Rank: 102 out of 423
Services
Preceding station	New York City Subway	Following station
Court Square 7 <7> toward 34th Street–Hudson Yards	Express	61st Street–Woodside <7> toward Flushing–Main Street
Court Square 7 <7> toward 34th Street–Hudson Yards	Local	33rd Street–Rawson Street 7 toward Flushing–Main Street
Lexington Avenue–59th Street N W via 34th Street–Herald Square	Local	39th Avenue N W toward Astoria–Ditmars Boulevard
Non-revenue services and lines
Preceding station	New York City Subway	Following station
57th Street 2nd Ave; demolished	no service	Astoria Boulevard Astoria express
Location
Location within New York City Subway
Location within New York City
Location within New York
Track layout
Lower level
Street map
Station service legend
Symbol	Description
Stops all times	Stops all times
Stops rush hours in the peak direction only	Stops rush hours in the peak direction only
Stops weekdays during the day	Stops weekdays during the day

The Queensboro Plaza station (originally named the Queensboro Bridge Plaza station or simply Bridge Plaza station) is an elevated New York City Subway station at Queens Plaza (originally called Queensboro Bridge Plaza or simply Bridge Plaza) in the Long Island City neighborhood of Queens. It is near the east end of the Queensboro Bridge, with Queens Boulevard running east from the plaza. The station is served by the 7 and N trains at all times, the W train on weekdays, and the <7> train during rush hours in the peak direction.

Queensboro Plaza was originally built in 1916–1917 as part of the Dual Contracts between New York City and the Brooklyn Rapid Transit Company (BRT) and the Interborough Rapid Transit Company (IRT). The station initially had eight tracks to allow BMT and IRT passengers to transfer between the Astoria, Flushing, and Second Avenue elevated lines. The northern section of the station was closed in the late 1940s and demolished in 1964. Queensboro Plaza now contains only four tracks: two each for the IRT Flushing Line (7 and <7> trains) and the BMT Astoria Line (N and W trains).

Today, Queensboro Plaza is the only station in the entire system to provide cross-platform transfers between "A" Division (7 and <7>) and "B" Division (N and W) trains. While the station is near the Queens Plaza underground subway station, which serves the IND Queens Boulevard Line, the two stations are separate and do not offer free transfers. West of the station, the Astoria Line descends into the 60th Street Tunnel under the East River into Manhattan, while the Flushing Line turns south before descending into the Steinway Tunnel past Court Square.

== History ==
=== Dual Contracts ===
==== Construction ====
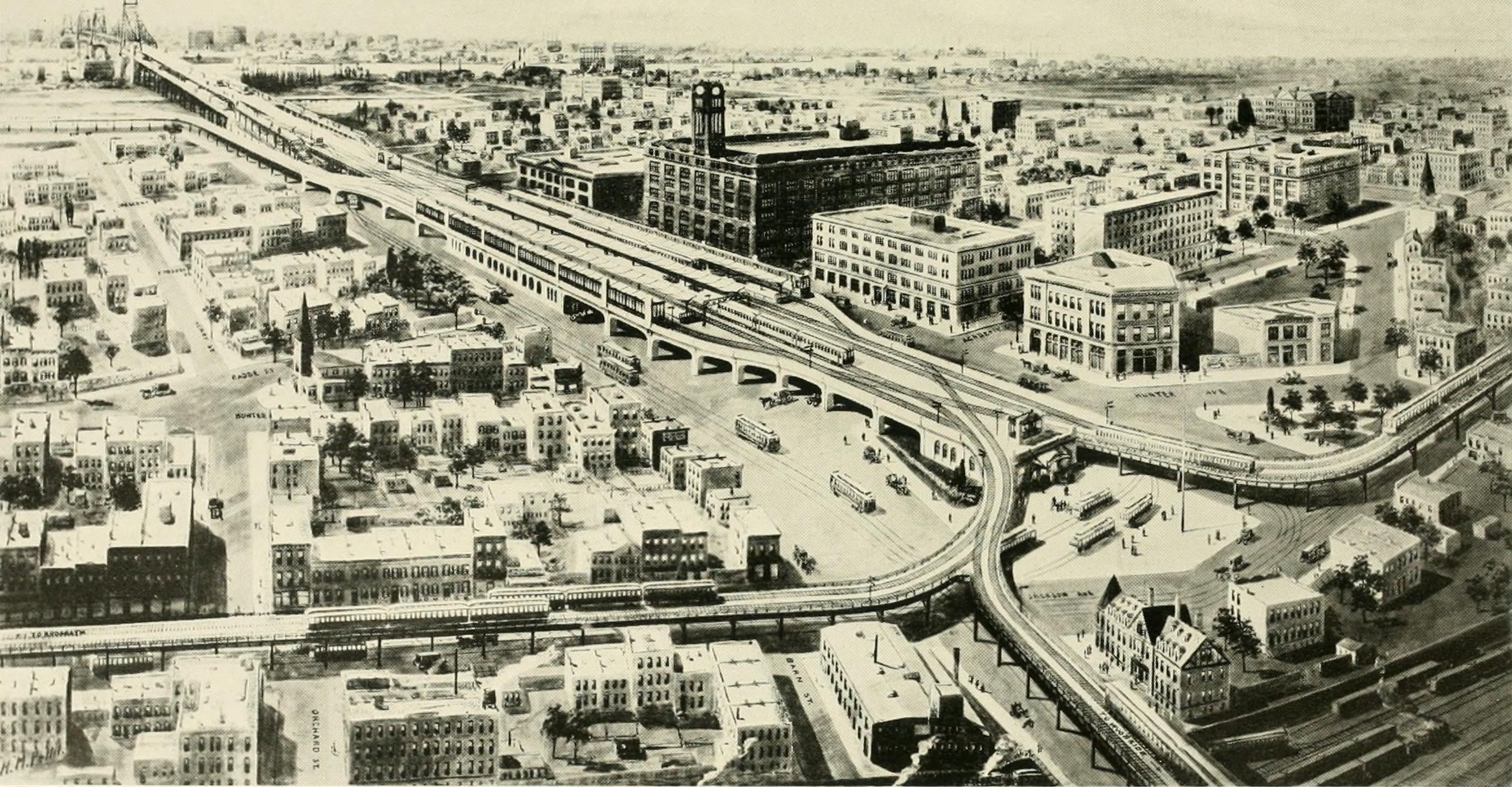
Illustration of the complex from a 1913 book, also showing a connection to a never-built elevated crosstown line at the bottom left side

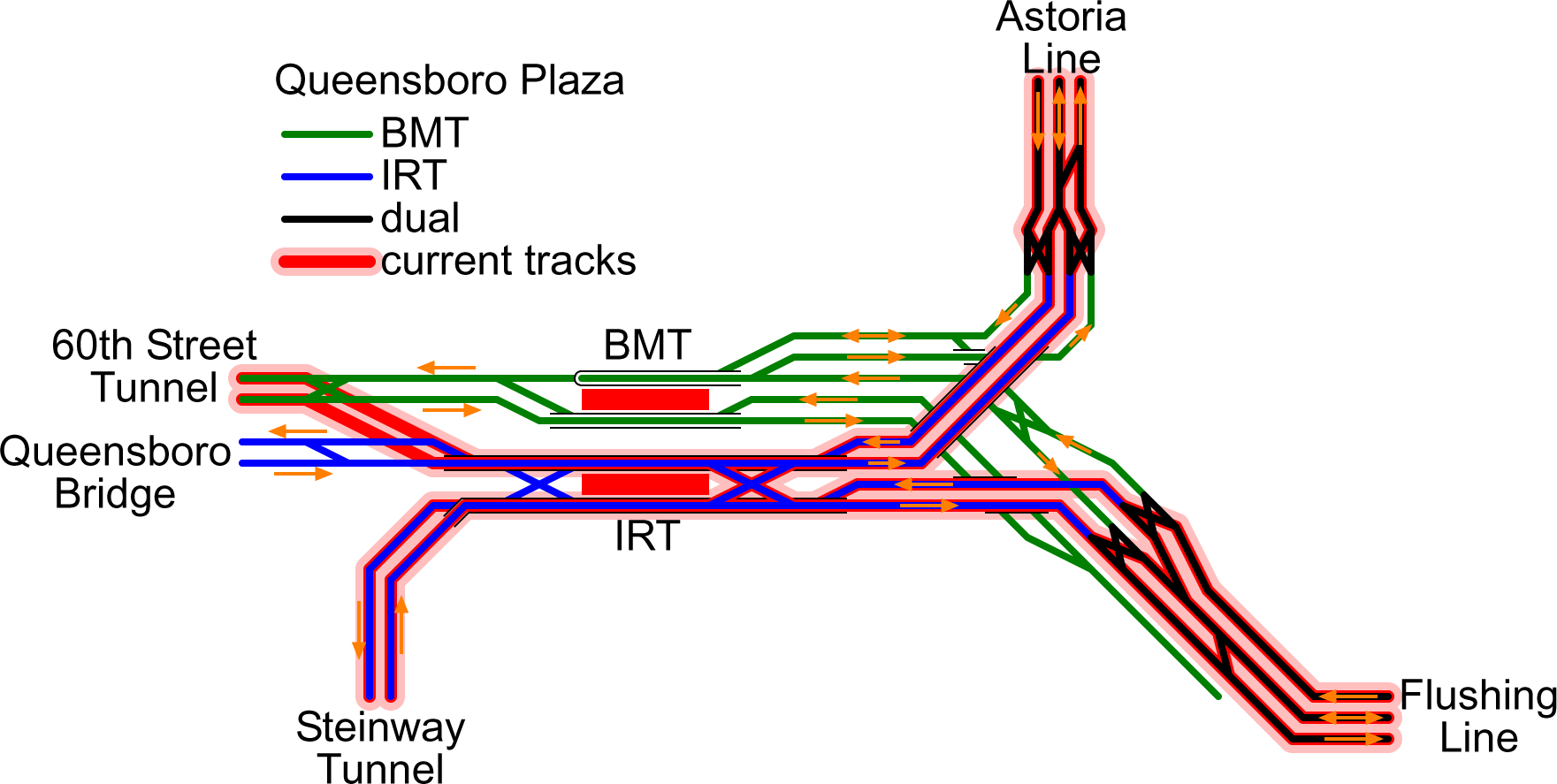
Former and current track configurations

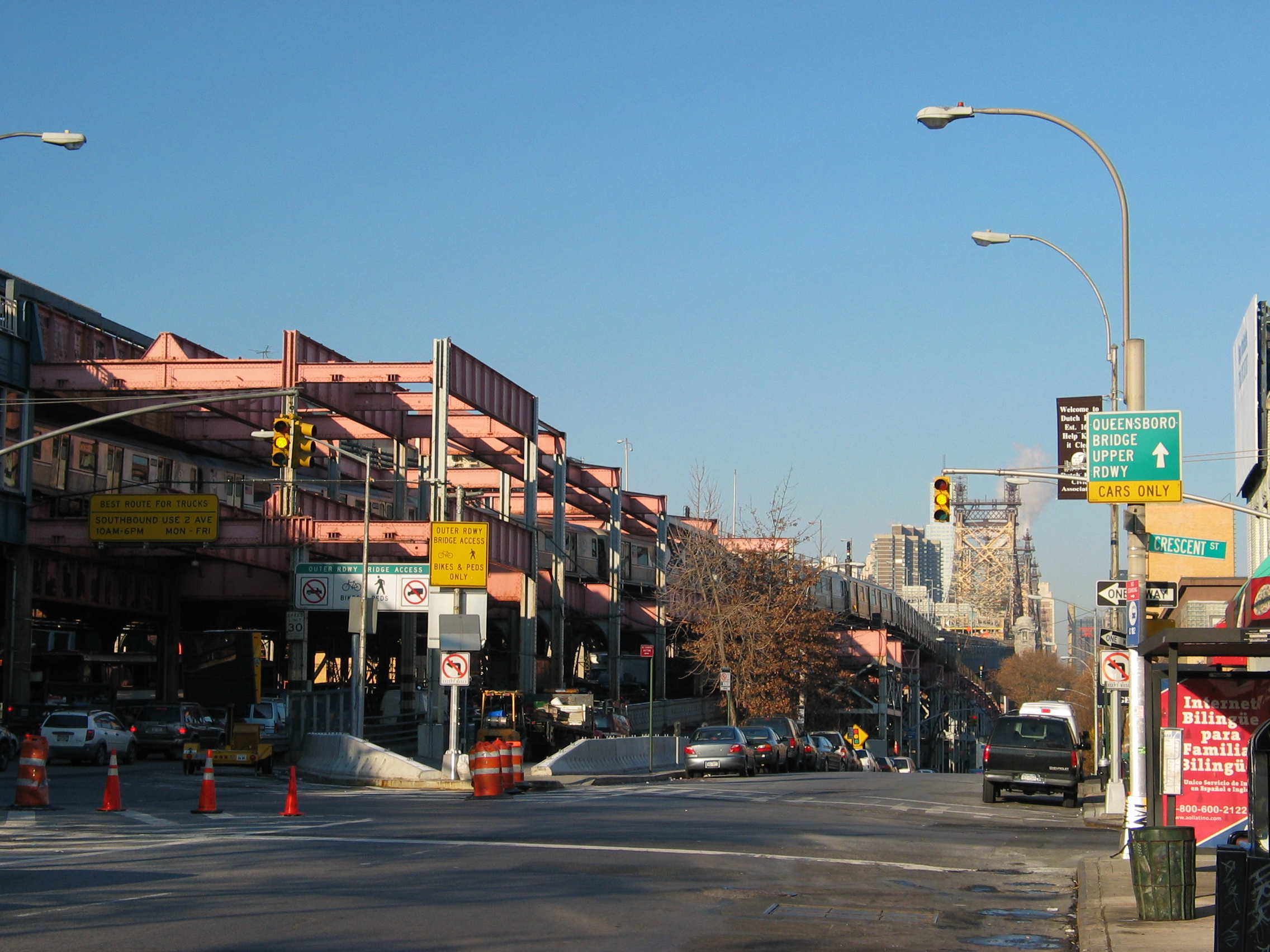
A train of R40M cars begins its descent into the 60th Street Tunnel, passing through the structure leading to the now-demolished northern (BMT) platforms.

The New York Public Service Commission adopted plans for what was known as the Broadway–Lexington Avenue route (later the Broadway Line) in Manhattan on December 31, 1907. A proposed Tri-borough system was adopted in early 1908. Operation of Manhattan's Broadway Line was assigned to the Brooklyn Rapid Transit Company (BRT, subsequently the Brooklyn–Manhattan Transit Corporation or BMT) in the Dual Contracts, adopted on March 4, 1913. The Dual Contracts also included opening the Steinway Tunnel, an incomplete tunnel between the New York City boroughs of Manhattan and Queens. The Steinway Tunnel would be operated by the Interborough Rapid Transit Company (IRT).

The Dual Contracts negotiations had been intricate and sometimes fractious. The IRT had initially been loath to let the BRT operate its Broadway Line through Midtown Manhattan, but relented when negotiators offered the BRT all of the proposed lines in the planned dual system. In Queens, which heretofore had no subway service, two lines had been proposed, both extending from an interchange station (later Queensboro Plaza) in Long Island City. The shorter Astoria Line would run to Astoria in northwestern Queens, while the longer Flushing Line would be built initially to Corona, and eventually to Flushing, in north-central Queens. As part of the Dual Contracts, the IRT was given ownership of both lines, but the BRT was given trackage rights over the routes, allowing both companies to share revenue from their Queens operations.

The Snare & Triest Construction Company was hired to construct the station for $884,859. The firm employed an average of 114 workers for each day. The Queensboro Plaza station was built as an eight-track station, with four tracks across each of two levels. Each company took two tracks on each level; the BRT took the two northernmost tracks, while the IRT took the two southernmost tracks. The lower level was for trains to Manhattan, while the upper level was for trains to Astoria or Corona (and later Flushing). By September 1915, the station was nearly 75 percent complete.

==== Operation ====
The southern half of the station opened on November 16, 1916, followed by the northern half of the station on February 1, 1917. In general, BRT trains were wider and longer than those on the IRT, and the Queens lines were built so that they could only fit the narrower IRT trains. The IRT had direct service into Manhattan via the Steinway Tunnel, as well as via the Queensboro Bridge to the Second Avenue elevated line. However, BRT trains from the 60th Street Tunnel and the Broadway Line in Manhattan could not run north or east of Queensboro Plaza, as they were wider. Consequently, BRT trains from Manhattan had to terminate on the northern side of the station, where cross-platform interchanges were available to narrower BRT shuttle trains that could run in Queens.

The city government took over the BMT's operations on June 1, 1940, and the IRT's operations on June 12, 1940. Second Avenue elevated service ceased on June 13, 1942.

The service on the Flushing and Astoria lines east of Queensboro Plaza was shared by the IRT and BMT until 1949. BMT trains on the Flushing Line were designated 9, while IRT services on that line were designated 7 on maps only. BMT and IRT trains on the Astoria Line were both designated 8. The IRT routes were given numbered designations in 1948 with the introduction of "R-type" rolling stock, which contained rollsigns with numbered designations for each service. The route from Times Square to Flushing became known as the 7.

=== Service changes and station modifications ===
==== 1940s to 1960s ====
On October 17, 1949, the $1.375 million renovation of the station was completed which allowed the rerouting of trains between Manhattan and Queens. As part of the project, the Astoria Line platforms were shaved back to allow BMT service to operate through to 60th Street, and new connections were built between the 60th Street Tunnel approach and the west tracks at the east (former IRT) platforms, and the west (former BMT) platforms were closed. Once the project was completed, the IRT started using the Flushing Line only and the BMT started using the Astoria Line only. With the station's renovation, it became easier for passengers to transfer between the IRT and BMT lines. Instead of having to climb between the upper and lower level platforms, passengers were able to use cross-platform transfers. There was a crossover just west of the station which allowed the Astoria trains to access the Steinway tunnels. This was removed directly after the joint operation ceased in 1949. Much of the mezzanine was rebuilt as part of the project, including the pedestrian bridges leading to either side of Queens Plaza. On the north side of the lower level, a new window wall was constructed.

After the end of BMT/IRT dual service, the BMT's Astoria Shuttle was replaced with service from the 2 Fourth Avenue Line (later the RR train, then the R train), operating from Astoria–Ditmars Boulevard to Bay Ridge–95th Street in Brooklyn; additional service was provided part-time by the 1 train (Brighton Express) and later the QT and QB trains (Brighton Local) and the T (West End Express). the New York City Board of Transportation announced that platforms on the Flushing Line would be lengthened to 11 IRT car lengths. With the exception of the Queensboro Plaza station, which was already 600 feet (180 m) long, the platforms were only able to fit nine 51-foot-long IRT cars beforehand. The platforms at the other Flushing Line stations were extended in 1955–1956 to accommodate 11-car trains. However, nine-car trains continued to run on the 7 route until 1962, when they were extended to ten cars. With the opening of the 1964 New York World's Fair, trains were lengthened to eleven cars.

In 1960, the city's Department of Traffic proposed demolishing the abandoned northern half of the Queensboro Plaza station to improve traffic flow. The abandoned structure was demolished in 1964. As part of the project, an overpass was constructed from the station towards Queens Plaza North, spanning the site of the demolished platforms. One set of crossovers between the BMT and IRT lines remains on the upper level; this is the Flushing Line's only track connection to the rest of the system.

==== 1970s to 1990s ====
During the first half of the 1970s, annual ridership at the station dropped 17 percent to 2.344 million by 1975. The subway system's operator, the Metropolitan Transportation Authority (MTA), allocated funding for the installation of reversible escalators in 1975 as part of the MTA's six-year capital plan. The New York City Department of City Planning proposed renovating the Queensboro Plaza station in 1979 as part of a $170 million project. The station would have been connected to the Queens Plaza station of the IND Queens Boulevard Line, as well as the proposed Northern Boulevard station on the 63rd Street Line, as part of the 63rd Street subway project. The project would have also included a new bus terminal, access to a parking garage, and a pedestrian mall on the north side of Northern Boulevard. The proposal was intended to attract business to the Queens Plaza area. Ultimately, the 63rd Street Line was constructed only as far as 21st Street–Queensbridge with no connections to the stations at Queens Plaza.

In 1981, the MTA listed the station among the 69 most deteriorated stations in the subway system. A renovation of the Queensboro Plaza station were funded as part of the MTA's 1980–1984 capital plan. The station was repainted in 1986. In addition, as part of an initiative called Creative Station, colorful nylon banners were installed on the viaducts next to the station for $15,000. The R train's northern terminal was swapped with that of the N in 1987, so the N went to Ditmars Boulevard (serving Queensboro Plaza) and the R went to 71st Avenue.

In April 1993, the New York State Legislature agreed to give the MTA $9.6 billion for capital improvements. Some of the funds would be used to renovate nearly one hundred New York City Subway stations, including Queensboro Plaza. The contract for the project's design was awarded in May 1994. Work on the renovation began in early 1998, at which point the project was expected to last four years.

==== 2000s to present ====
The W train started serving the Astoria Line, including the Queensboro Plaza station, in 2001. The W was discontinued in June 2010 and replaced with the Q until November 2016, when the W was restored.

In 2018, it was announced that the Queensboro Plaza station may receive elevators as part of a process to expand the New York City Subway system's accessibility. As of February 2021, funding had been committed to accessibility renovations at the Queensboro Plaza station. Accessibility improvements at Queensboro Plaza were approved in December 2021, and the MTA began preliminary work shortly afterward. The work involved installing a new elevator from the south side of Queens Plaza to the mezzanine and a second elevator from the mezzanine to the platforms. In addition, the mezzanine was extended 50 feet (15 m) east to accommodate the elevator connecting the mezzanine and the platforms, and the overpass to the northern exit was widened. To accommodate the new elevator, the southbound platform was closed for two weeks and partially rebuilt in August 2023. The project also involved the installation of new platform edges with ADA boarding areas, an ADA ramp at mezzanine level, additional digital information screens, and new CCTV and public address systems. The south elevator entrance and the mezzanine-to-platform elevator opened on December 12, 2024; the entire project was budgeted at $74 million.

In February 2022, developer Grubb Properties filed plans for a 26-story apartment tower at 25–01 Queens Plaza North. The project will include a third elevator, running between the north side of Queens Plaza and the mezzanine. This elevator opened on April 10, 2025, providing a second accessible entrance on the northern side of the station. The MTA announced in late 2025 that a customer service center would open at the station.

== Station layout ==
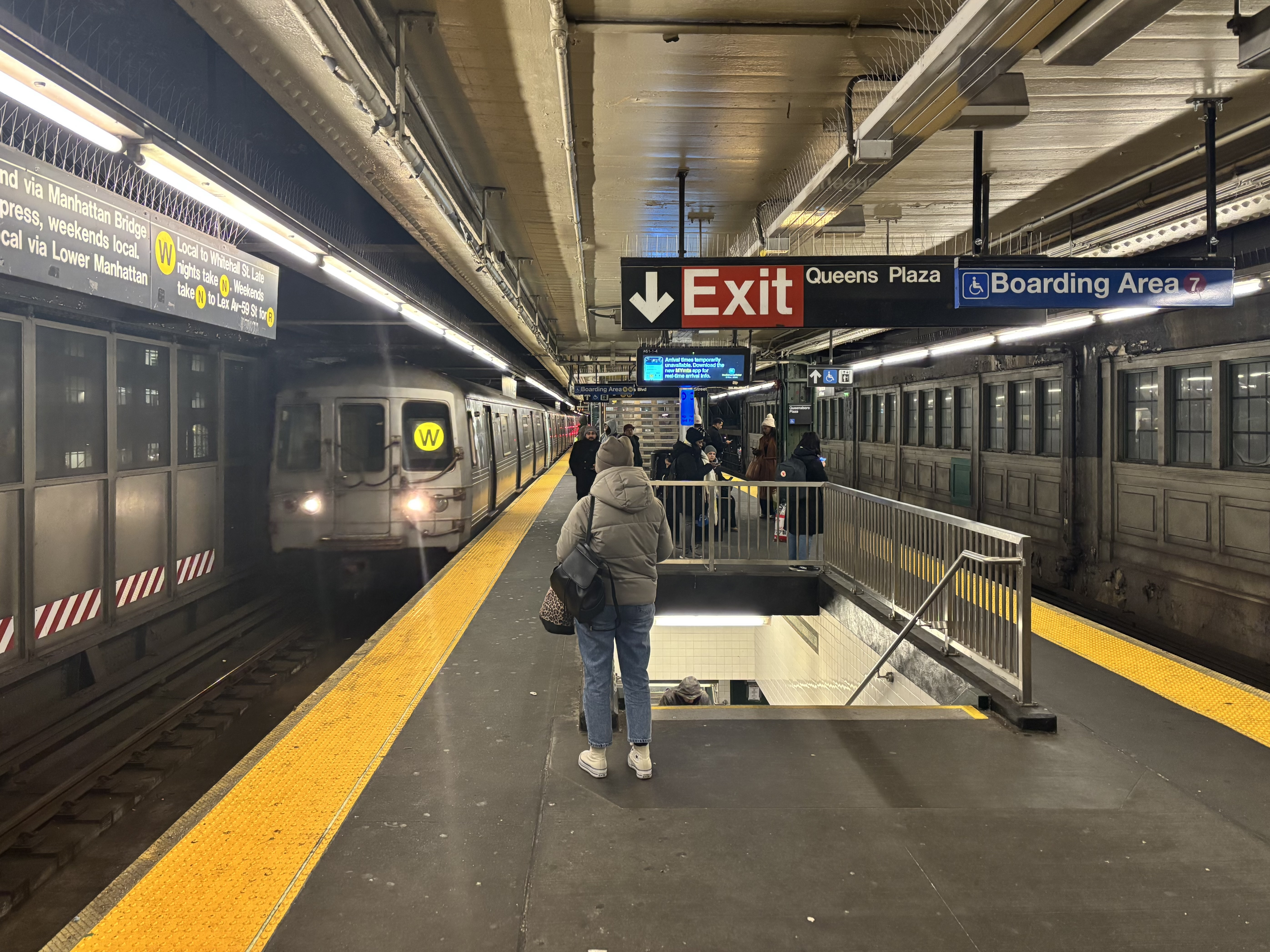
R46 W train arriving on the lower level

This two-level station has two island platforms (one on each level) and four tracks. It stands over the south (railroad east) side of the roadway, but formerly spanned the whole plaza. Trains running into Queens stop on the upper level and Manhattan-bound trains below. On both levels, the BMT Astoria Line (which to the south joins with the 60th Street Tunnel Connection and heads through the 60th Street Tunnel to the BMT Broadway Line) uses the north track and the IRT Flushing Line uses the south track.

In 2014, the station was renovated by NYCTA employees (as opposed to an outside contractor). A computer assisted tower was installed on the south end, as part of the IRT Flushing Line automation.

=== Track layout ===
In the original configuration, the station had eight tracks: four on each level. The station was 840 ft (260 m) long in total. Originally, the IRT used both sides of the current platforms, and the BMT used now-demolished platforms north of the current platforms, also double-decked. The south side of the IRT platforms was used by the Flushing Line, as today. The north side was used by Astoria trains, but instead of going through the 60th Street Tunnel, they went over the Queensboro Bridge to the elevated IRT Second Avenue Line. Double crossovers south (lower tracks) and north (upper tracks) of the platforms allowed trains from either side to switch to the other line after leaving the station.

At the BMT half, the south track served subway trains to Manhattan and the BMT Broadway Line. By 1924, trains came from Manhattan on the upper level, continued north to a merge with the lower level, and then returned via the lower level. Before that, trains reversed direction using a double crossover south of the platforms. Since the platforms were IRT-size, the BMT used its own elevated cars to provide service on the lines, with a required transfer at Queensboro Plaza. Shuttles from Astoria came in on the west side lower track and then reversed direction to head to Flushing; Flushing trains came in on the upper track and reversed direction towards Astoria.

During the early period of dual service on the Astoria and Flushing portions, IRT and BMT trains had their own stopping marks on the platforms and the sections of the platforms were separated. Passengers had separate entrances to the platforms depending on which service they wanted. This set-up prevented free transfers between the trains of the two companies. This arrangement had to end when the IRT lengthened trains. The two companies worked out an agreement in which the revenue collected on those stations was shared.

After 1949, the track layout around the station was greatly simplified. Only the original southern side of the Queensboro Plaza station remains in service, with two tracks on each level. Queens-bound trains use the upper level, while Manhattan-bound trains use the lower level. BMT trains use the northern tracks on each level and IRT trains use the southern tracks. A double crossover remains on the upper level. This connection is used for non-revenue moves, specifically to transfer subway cars to the Coney Island Shops for repairs, or to move rolling stock to or from the Flushing Line.

=== Exits ===
The station's only exits are through a mezzanine located below the lower level (and formerly connected to the now torn-down BMT platforms to the west). From the mezzanine, there is a concrete footbridge across Queens Plaza North to the second floor of a building. There is also an overpass leading to Queens Plaza South. There are elevators at both the Queens Plaza South entrance and the Queens Plaza North entrance.

== In popular culture ==
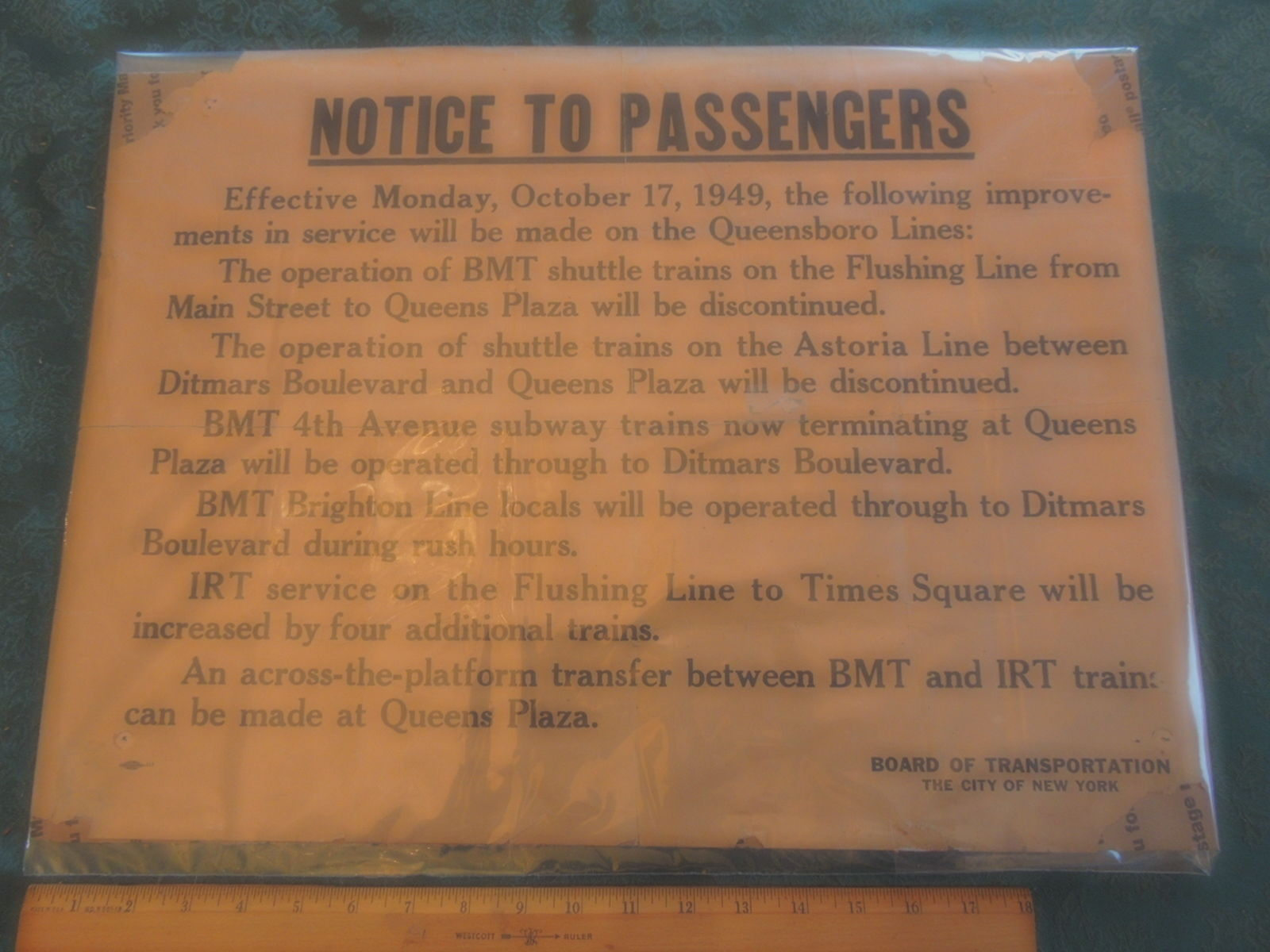
A poster describing the changes at Queensboro Plaza in 1949

Queensboro Plaza is featured in a defining moment in the film Beneath the Planet of the Apes. The protagonist astronaut ("Brent") unknowingly enters the ruins of an underground station; upon seeing the words "Queensboro Plaza" in tiles, and finding an advertisement for the New York Summer Festival, he realizes that he is indeed on Earth and not another planet, and that New York City has been destroyed in a nuclear war. In reality, Queensboro Plaza is an elevated station and has no tilework.

The station is also featured in the Seinfeld episode entitled "The Cigar Store Indian", as the location of a renowned gyro stall, and again incorrectly depicted as an underground station, on an IRT Lexington Avenue Line 6 train.

The station is also incorrectly depicted as an underground station in an episode of Brooklyn Nine-Nine.

The station and nearby MetLife Plaza were a regular CG composite as location shots between scenes in ABC series Ugly Betty.

The station also appears briefly in the season 2 opening sequence of HBO political drama The Newsroom.

The station is also shown in the TV show The King of Queens's theme song, which shows a Redbird 7 train entering the station's upper level.

The station also appears on Sesame Street in a looking for triangles film with Maria (Sonia Manzano).

A shot of the station appears in the 2020 Pixar movie Soul.

== Gallery ==
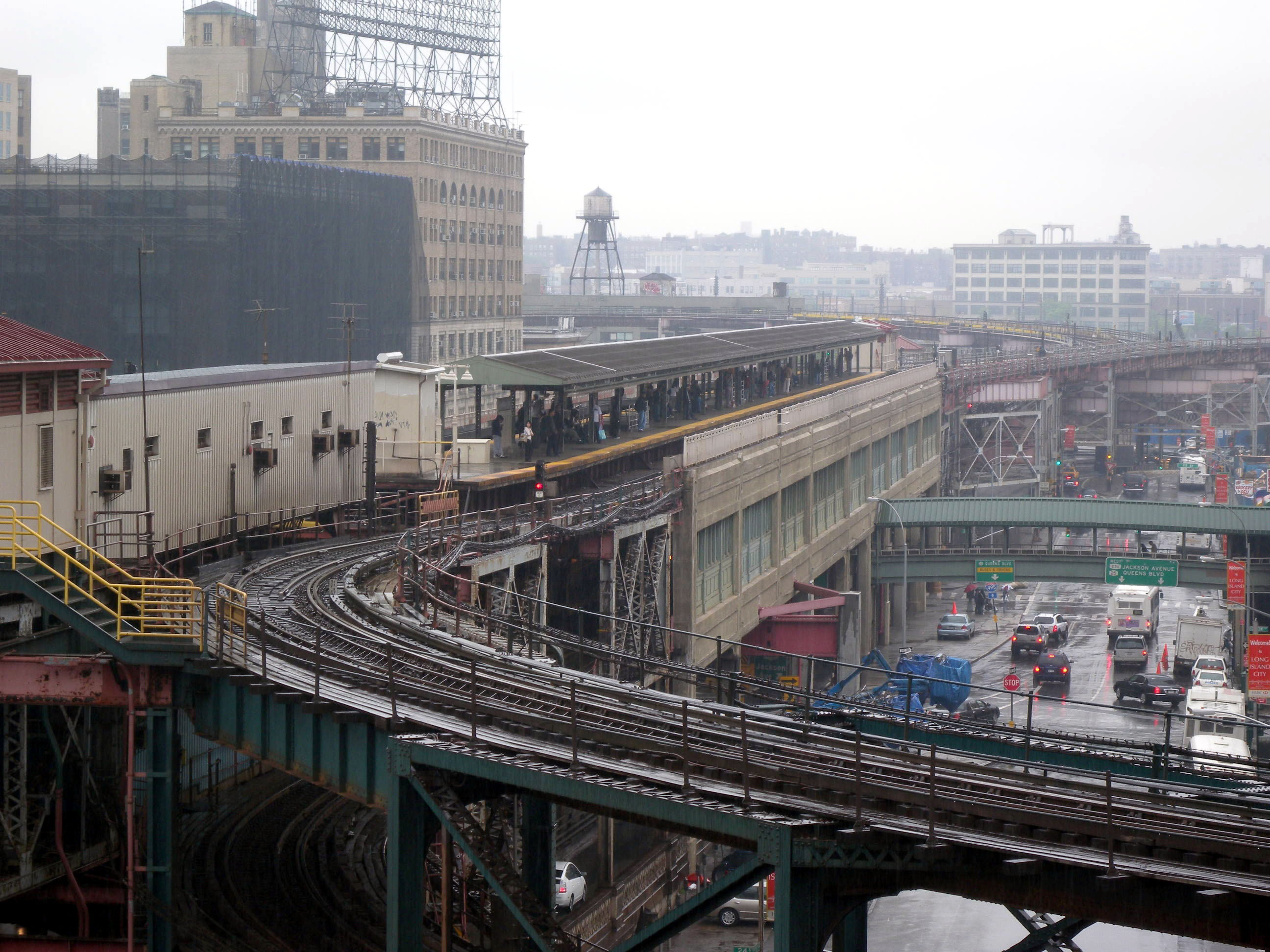
From the west

Looking toward the east

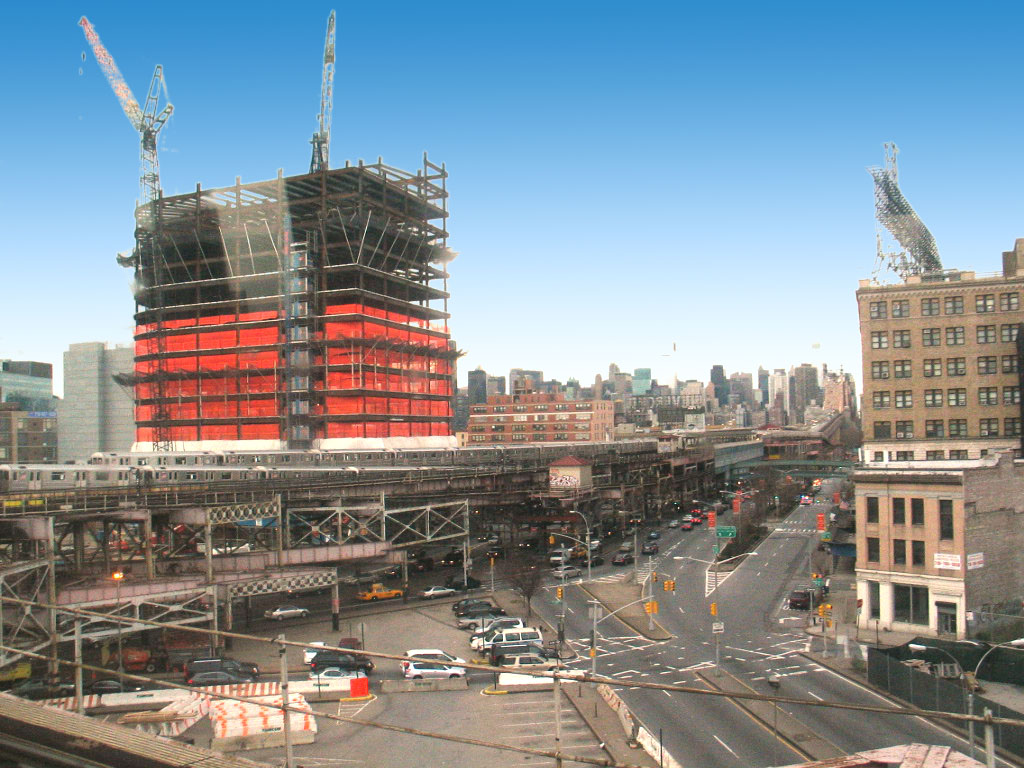
From the southbound BMT Astoria Line

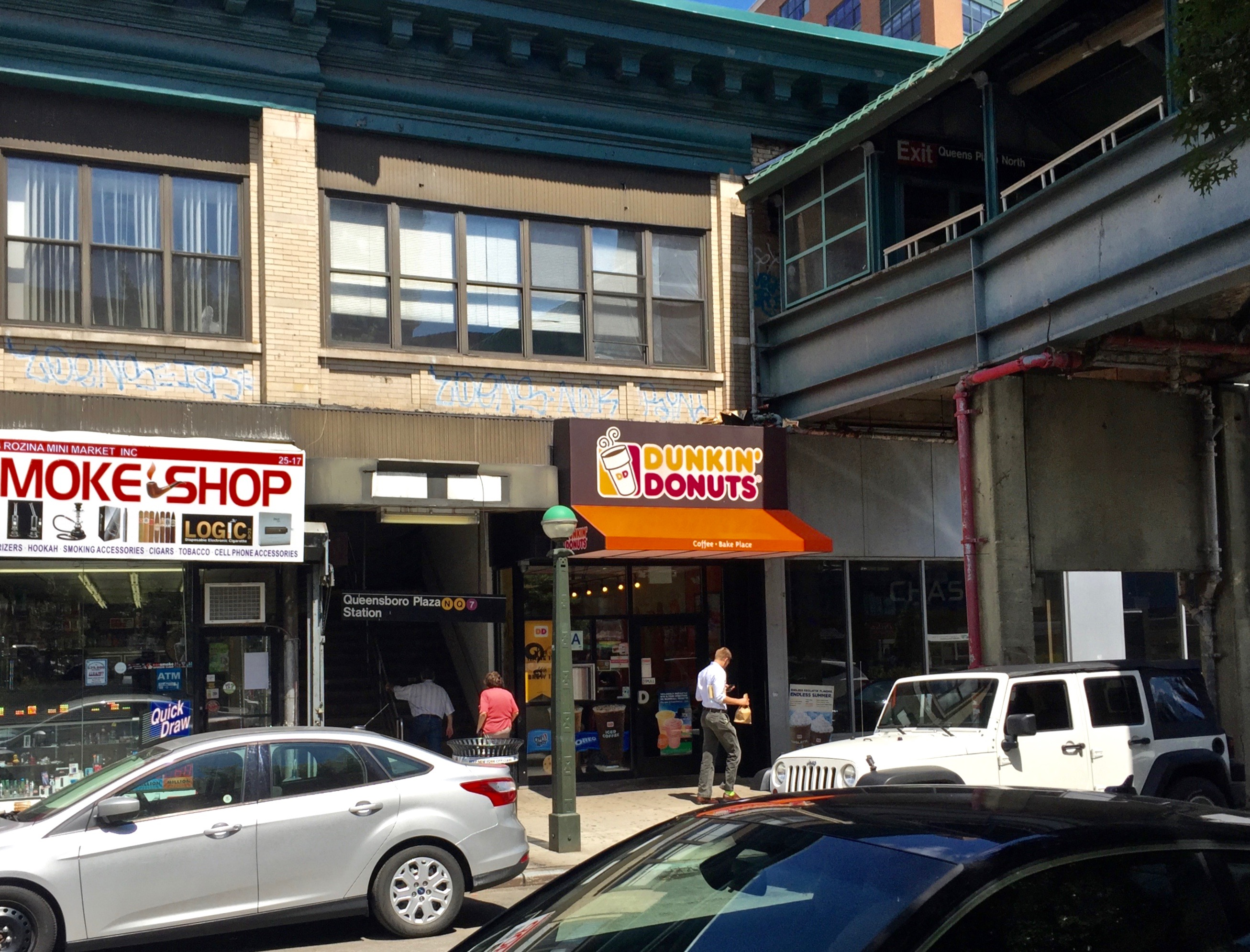
Entrance on the north side of Queens Plaza inside the original building before their demolition and refurbishment as part of a residential development

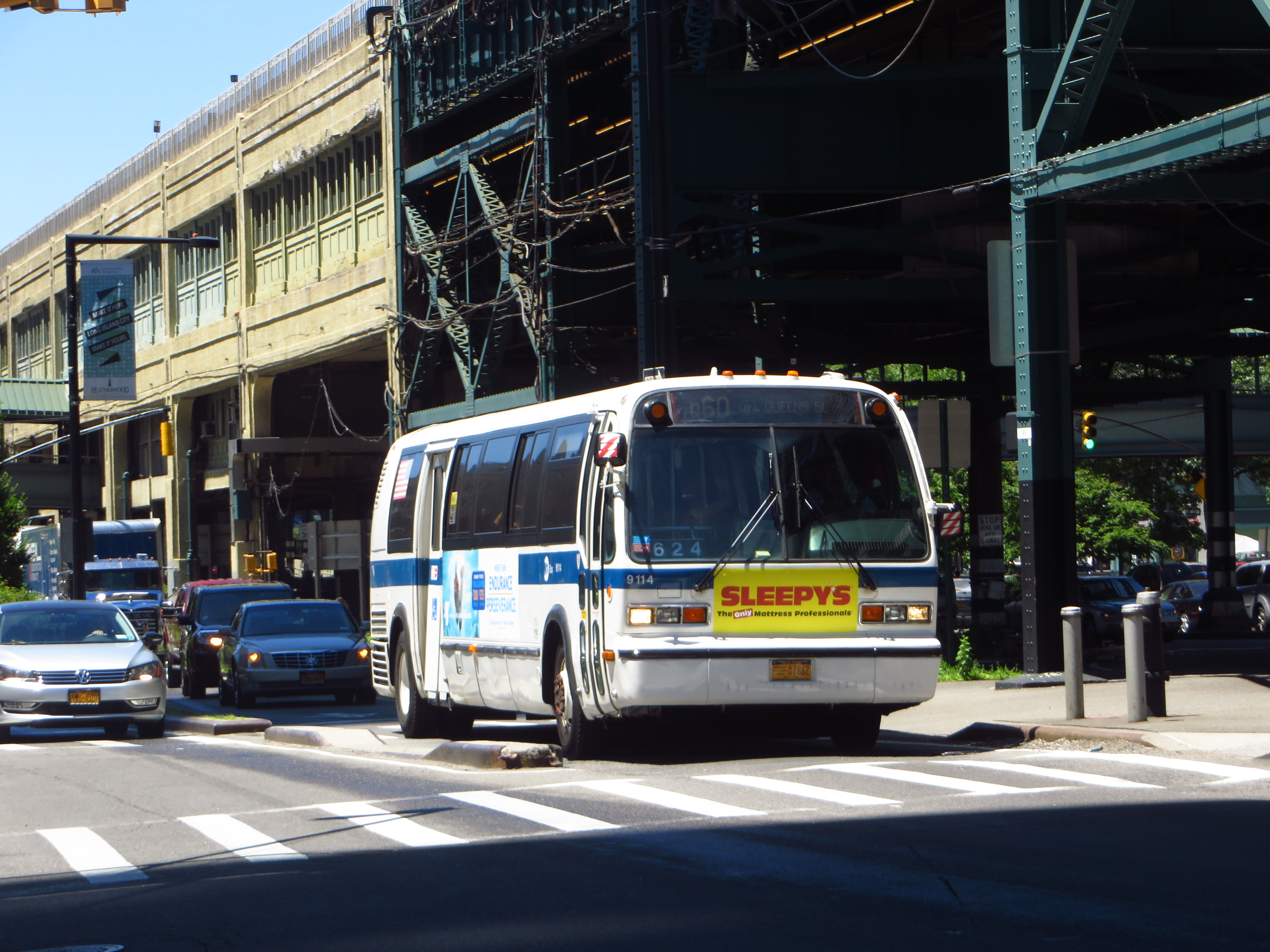
A Q60 bus outside the station

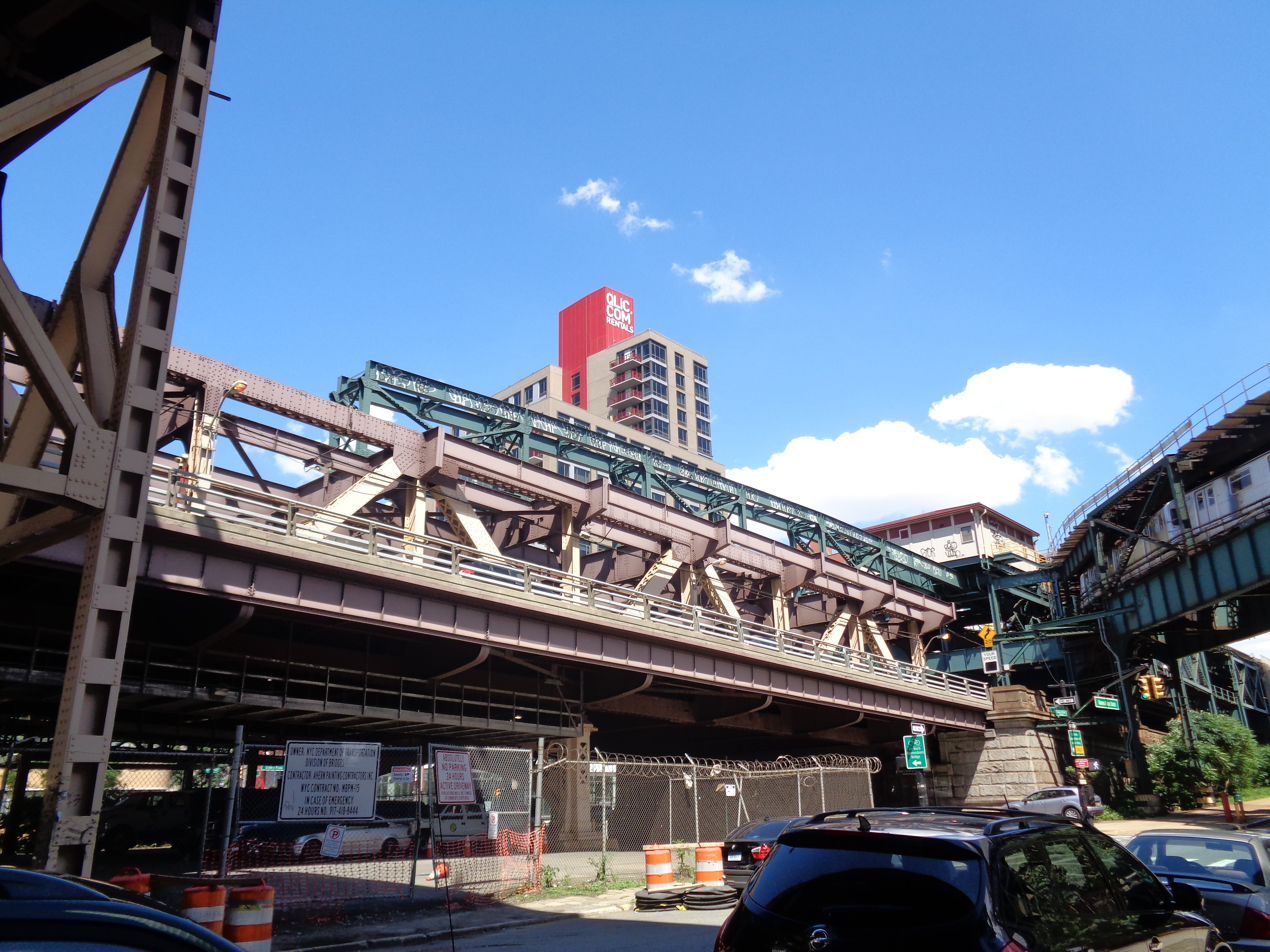
The former IRT Second Avenue Line approaches to the Queensboro Bridge

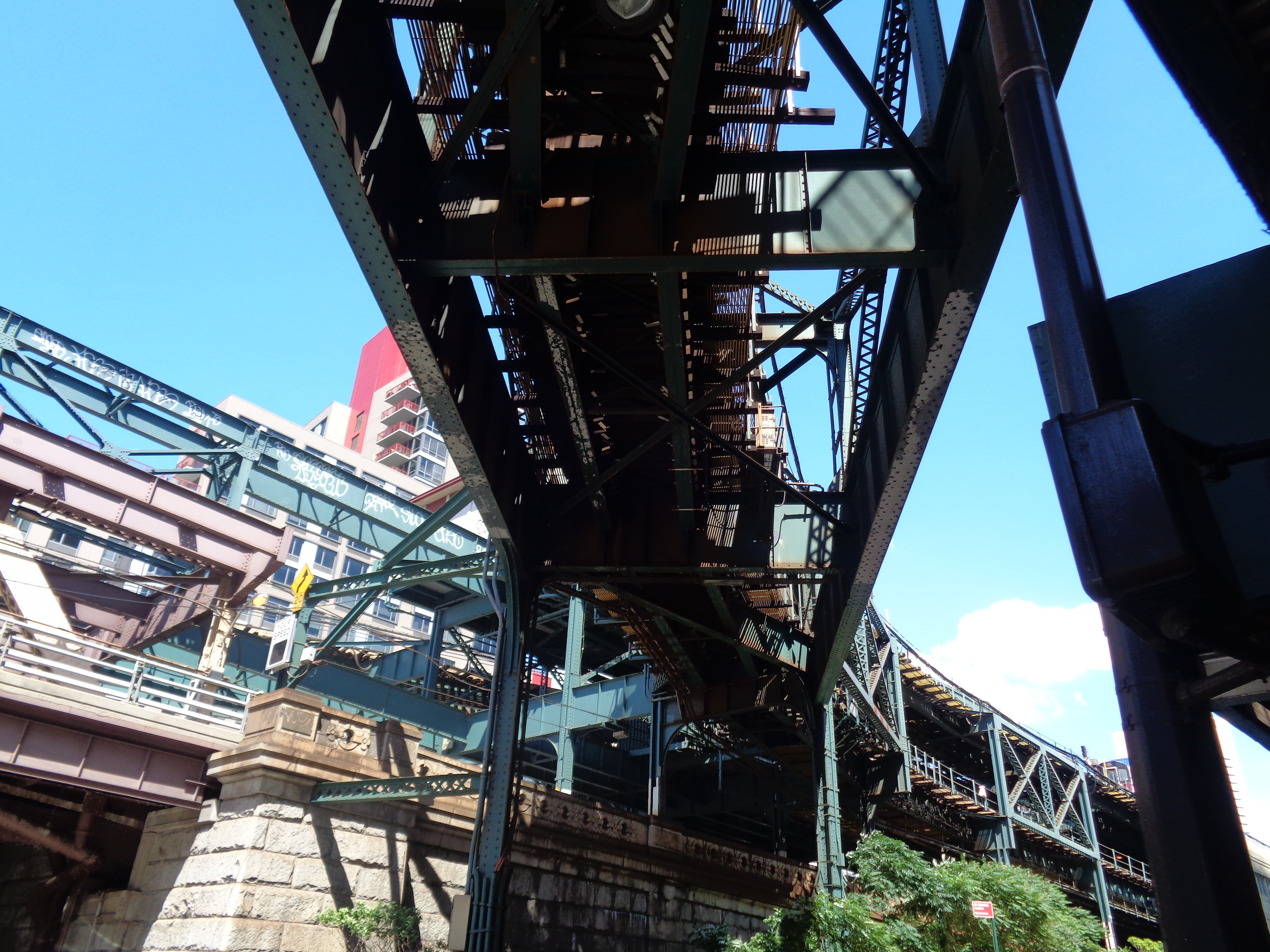
View from underneath the Flushing Line trackways

A view of the Queensboro Plaza station from the Ed Koch Queensboro Bridge
