= Broadway station (BMT Astoria Line) =

New York City Subway station in Queens

Broadway
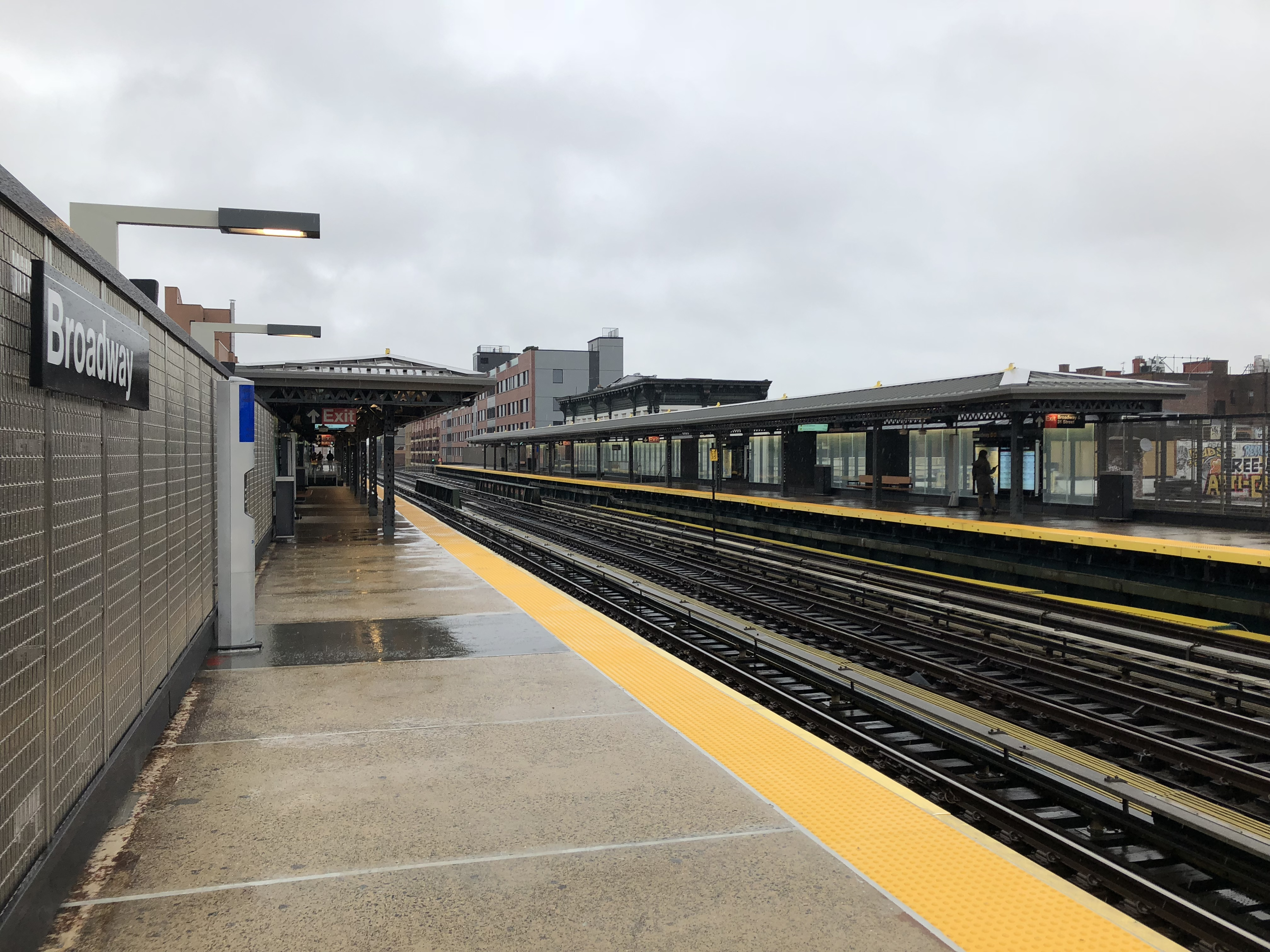
- View from the southbound platform

Station statistics
- Address: Broadway & 31st Street; Astoria, New York
- Borough: Queens
- Locale: Astoria
- Coordinates: 40.761951°N 73.925414°W
- Division: B (BMT)
- Line: BMT Astoria Line
- Services: N (all times); W (weekdays)
- Transit: MTA Bus: Q104
- Structure: Elevated
- Platforms: 2 side platforms
- Tracks: 3 (2 in regular service)

Other information
- Opened: February 1, 1917; 109 years ago
- Closed: July 2, 2018; 8 years ago (reconstruction)
- Rebuilt: January 24, 2019; 7 years ago
- Accessible: No; under construction

Traffic
- 2025: 3,012,199 ▲6.4%
- Rank: 124 out of 423
Services
Preceding station	New York City Subway	Following station
36th Avenue N W via 34th Street–Herald Square	Local	30th Avenue N W toward Astoria–Ditmars Boulevard
Location
Location within New York City Subway
Location within New York City
Location within New York
Track layout
Street map
Station service legend
Symbol	Description
Stops all times	Stops all times
Stops weekdays during the day	Stops weekdays during the day

The Broadway station is a local station on the BMT Astoria Line of the New York City Subway. It is located above 31st Street at Broadway in Astoria, Queens. The station is served by the N train at all times, as well as by the W train on weekdays.

== History ==
This station opened on February 1, 1917, along with the rest of the Astoria Line, which was originally part of the IRT, as a spur off the IRT Queensboro Line, which is now the IRT Flushing Line. Trains ran between Grand Central and Astoria. On July 23, 1917, the Queensboro Bridge spur of the elevated IRT Second Avenue Line opened. At that time, all elevated trains to Queensboro Plaza used the Astoria Line while all subway trains used the IRT Flushing Line, though this was later changed with trains alternating between branches. This station started to be served by BMT shuttles using elevated cars on April 8, 1923.

The city government took over the BMT's operations on June 1, 1940, and the IRT's operations on June 12, 1940. On October 17, 1949, the Astoria Line became BMT-only as the tracks at Queensboro Plaza were consolidated and the platforms on the Astoria Line were shaved back to allow BMT trains to operate on it. Service was initially provided by the Brighton Local (BMT 1) and the Broadway–Fourth Avenue Local (BMT 2) at all times.

=== Station renovations ===
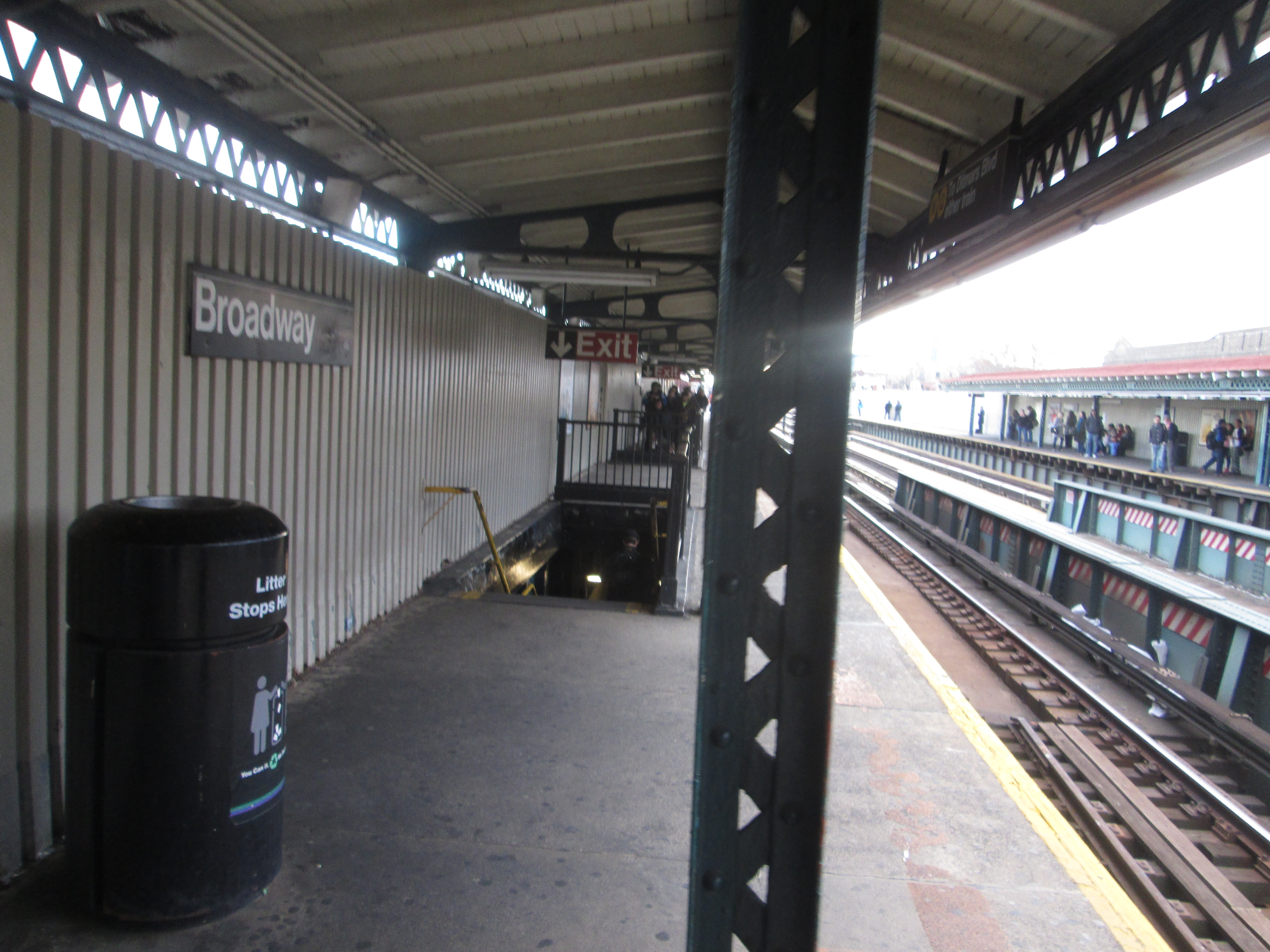
Prior to the renovations

The platforms at this station, along with six others on the Astoria Line, were lengthened to 610 feet (190 m) to accommodate ten-car trains in 1950. The project cost $863,000. Signals on the line had to be modified to take the platform extensions into account.

Under the 2015–2019 MTA Capital Plan, the station underwent a complete overhaul as part of the Enhanced Station Initiative and was entirely closed for several months. Updates included cellular service, Wi-Fi, USB charging stations, interactive service advisories and maps. The award for Package 2 of the renovations, which covered renovations at the 30th Avenue, Broadway, 36th Avenue, and 39th Avenue stations, was awarded on April 14, 2017, to Skanska USA. The Broadway and 39th Avenue stations were closed entirely on July 2, 2018, and reopened on January 24, 2019, slightly earlier than expected. A previously demolished entrance to the northeast corner of Broadway and 31st Street was added once again to improve access.

In 2019, the MTA announced that this station would become ADA-accessible as part of the agency's 2020–2024 Capital Program. A request for proposals was put out on May 18, 2023 for the contract for a project bundle to make 13 stations accessible, including Broadway. A contract for two elevators at the station was awarded in December 2023.

== Station layout ==
This station has two side platforms and three tracks. The center track is not used in revenue service, but it had been used regularly as recently as 2002. The station contains wooden canopies with transite and wooden mezzanines, but only the southbound platform has windscreens. The station has a narrow crossover in its mezzanine that allows for passengers to change their direction of travel at the station.

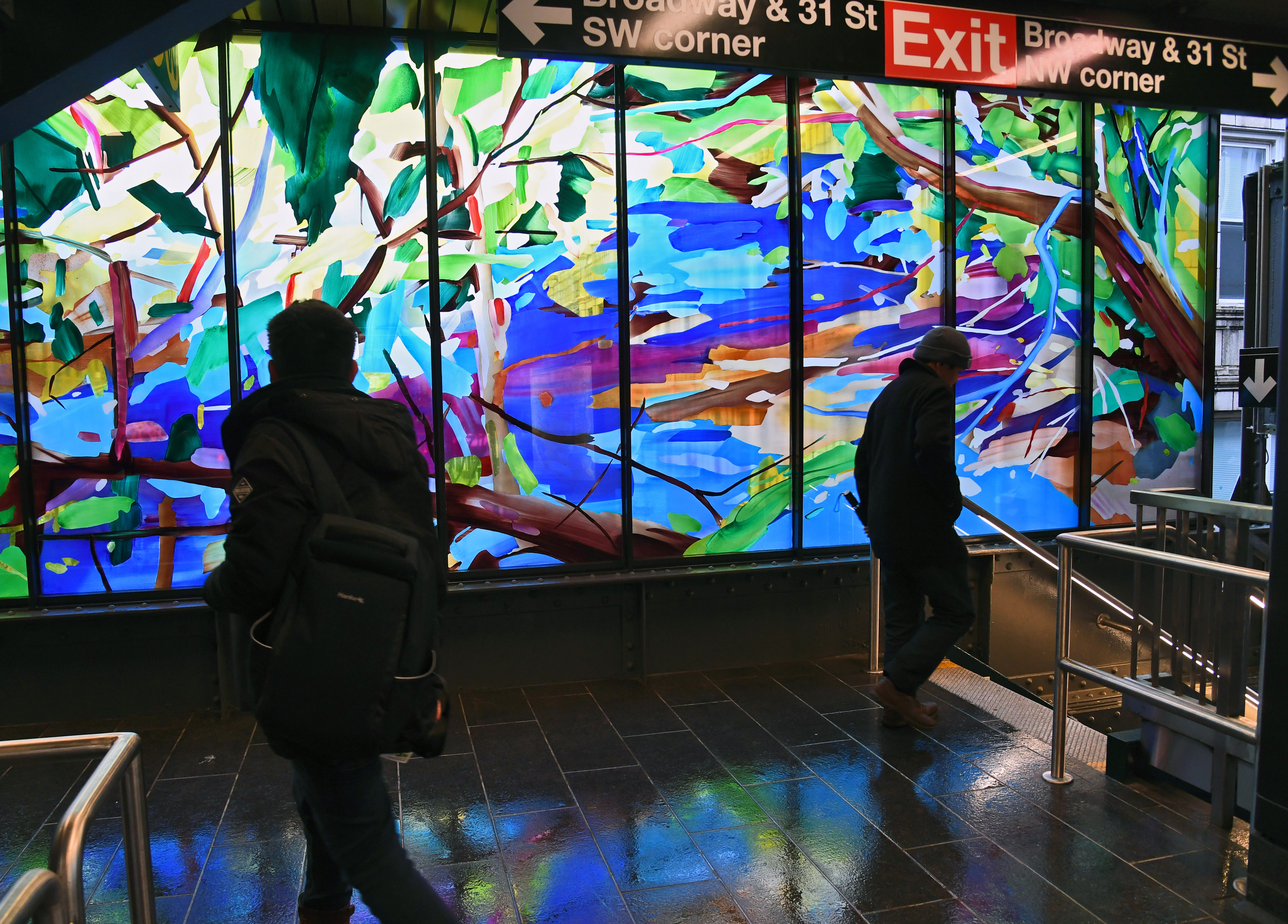
Outlook, Diane Carr, 2018

As part of the MTA Arts & Design program, Diane Carr created an artwork for the station, titled Outlook, which was installed in 2018. The work consists of hand-painted laminated glass murals in the mezzanine, fabricated by Peters Studios / Glasmalerei Peters. The artwork is painted in shades of purple, green, and blue, along with accents in shades of brown, orange, and magenta. According to Carr, the shapes in the artwork are inspired by the original landscape of the area, which once included swamps, ponds, woods, and meadows.

=== Exits ===
The mezzanine is configured like 30th Avenue. Outside of fare control, street stairs descend to all corners of Broadway and 31st Street. An exit-only stair from the northbound platform descends to the east side of 31st Street between Broadway and 34th Avenue.
