= 39th Avenue station (BMT Astoria Line) =

New York City Subway station in Queens

39 Avenue
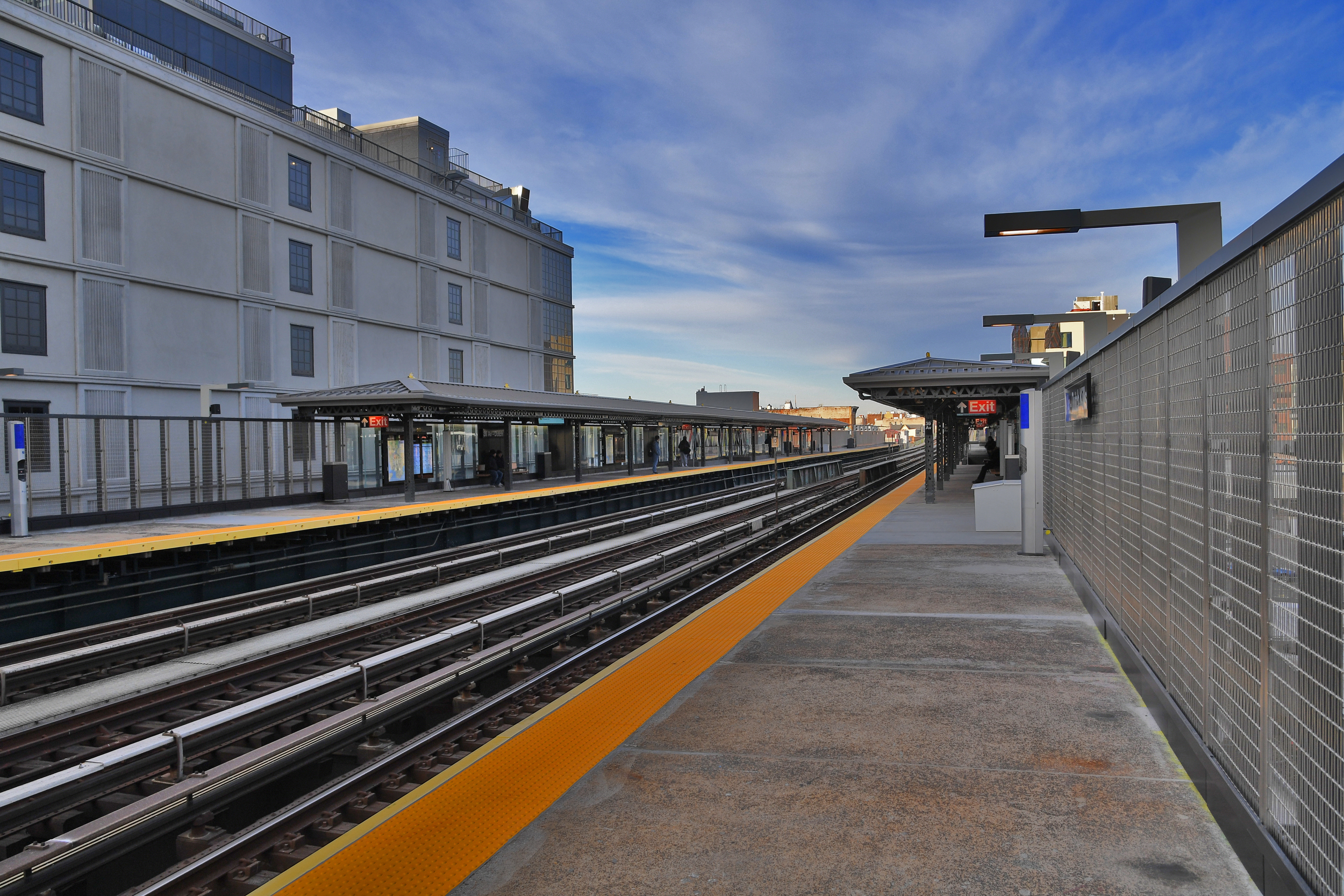
- View from northbound platform

Station statistics
- Address: 39th Avenue & 31st Street; Long Island City, New York
- Borough: Queens
- Locale: Long Island City
- Coordinates: 40.752686°N 73.932924°W
- Division: B (BMT)
- Line: BMT Astoria Line
- Services: N (all times); W (weekdays)
- Transit: MTA Bus: Q102
- Structure: Elevated
- Platforms: 2 side platforms
- Tracks: 3 (2 in regular service)

Other information
- Opened: February 1, 1917; 109 years ago
- Closed: July 2, 2018; 8 years ago (reconstruction)
- Rebuilt: January 28, 2019; 7 years ago
- Former/other names: 39th Avenue–Beebe Avenue, 39th Avenue

Traffic
- 2025: 943,246 ▲8.7%
- Rank: 322 out of 423
Services
Preceding station	New York City Subway	Following station
Queensboro Plaza N W via 34th Street–Herald Square	Local	36th Avenue N W toward Astoria–Ditmars Boulevard
Location
Location within New York City Subway
Location within New York City
Location within New York
Track layout
Street map
Station service legend
Symbol	Description
Stops all times	Stops all times
Stops weekdays during the day	Stops weekdays during the day

The 39th Avenue station (signed as the 39th Avenue–Dutch Kills station and formerly known as the 39th Avenue–Beebe Avenue station) is a local station on the BMT Astoria Line of the New York City Subway. It is located at 39th Avenue and 31st Street in Long Island City, Queens. The station is served by the N train at all times, as well as by the W train on weekdays.

== History ==
This station opened on February 1, 1917, along with the rest of the Astoria Line, which was originally part of the IRT, as a spur off the IRT Queensboro Line, which is now the IRT Flushing Line. Trains ran between Grand Central and Astoria. On July 23, 1917, the Queensboro Bridge spur of the elevated IRT Second Avenue Line opened. At that time, all elevated trains to Queensboro Plaza used the Astoria Line while all subway trains used the IRT Flushing Line, though this was later changed with trains alternating between branches. This station started to be served by BMT shuttles using elevated cars on April 8, 1923.

The city government took over the BMT's operations on June 1, 1940, and the IRT's operations on June 12, 1940. On October 17, 1949, the Astoria Line became BMT-only as the tracks at Queensboro Plaza were consolidated and the platforms on the Astoria Line were shaved back to allow BMT trains to operate on it. Service was initially provided by the Brighton Local (BMT 1) and the Broadway–Fourth Avenue Local (BMT 2) at all times.

=== Station renovations ===
The platforms at this station, along with six others on the Astoria Line, were lengthened to 610 feet (190 m) to accommodate ten-car trains in 1950. The project cost $863,000. Signals on the line had to be modified to take the platform extensions into account.

Under the 2015–2019 MTA Capital Plan, the station underwent a complete overhaul as part of the Enhanced Station Initiative and was entirely closed for several months. Updates included cellular service, Wi-Fi, USB charging stations, interactive service advisories and maps. The award for Package 2 of the renovations, which covered renovations at the 30th Avenue, Broadway, 36th Avenue, and 39th Avenue stations, was awarded on April 14, 2017, to Skanska USA. The Broadway and 39th Avenue stations were closed entirely on July 2, 2018, and reopened on January 24, 2019, slightly earlier than expected. A previously demolished entrance to the northeast corner of Broadway and 31st Street was added once again to improve access. New station signage saying "39th Avenue–Dutch Kills" was installed after the Dutch Kills Civic Association requested it. Trains still use the old "39th Avenue" name.

== Station layout ==
This elevated station has three tracks and two side platforms. The center track is not used in revenue service, but it had been used regularly as recently as 2002. The center track merges with the two outer tracks south of this station.

Both platforms have windscreens that run along their lengths and red canopies with green support columns in the center. The station signs are in the standard black name plate in white lettering.

As part of the MTA Arts & Design program, the British-American painter Sarah Morris created an artwork for the station, titled Hellion Equilibrium, which was installed in 2019. The artwork, installed on the walls of each platform, consists of multicolored shapes that allude to the station's GPS location.

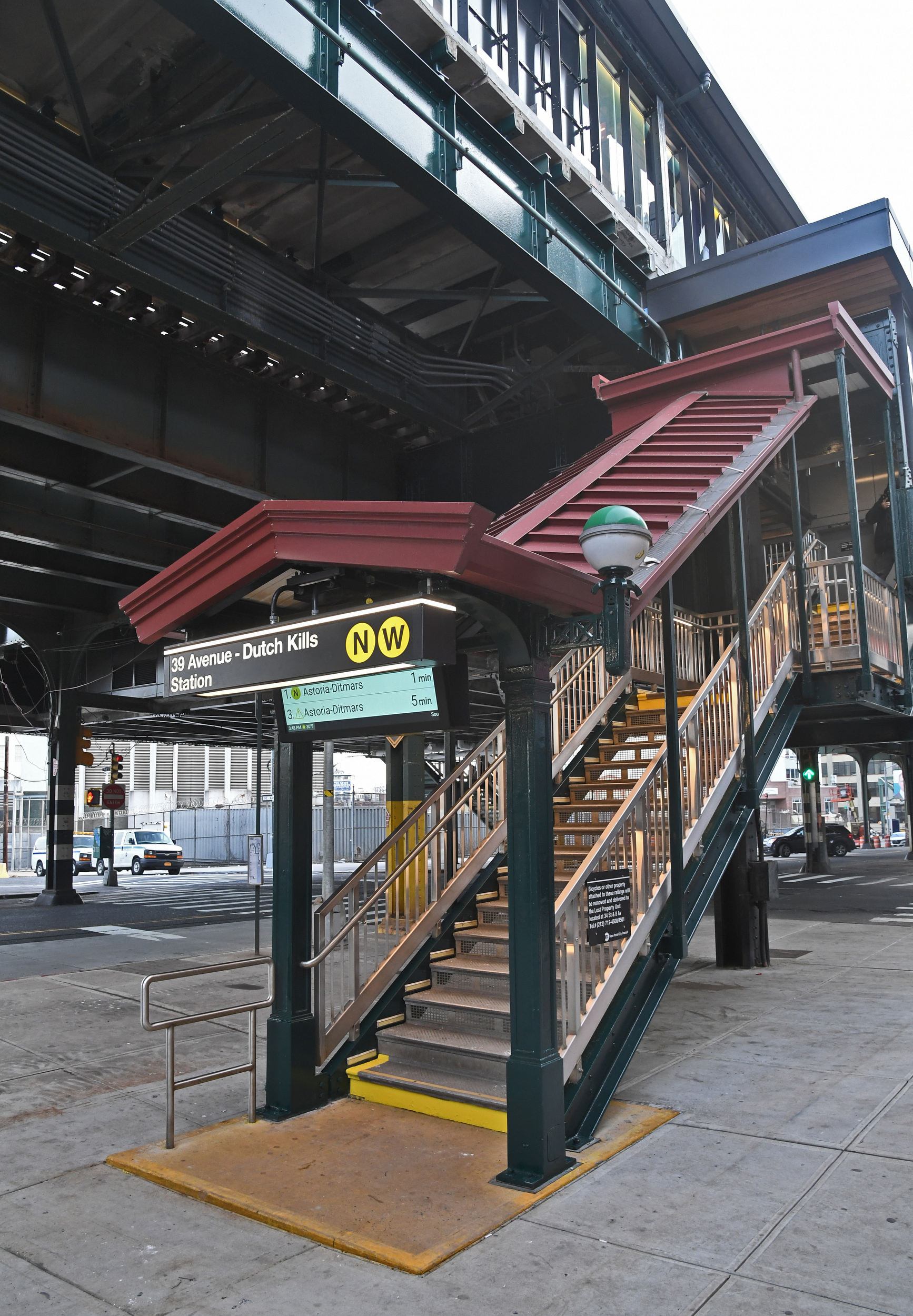
Renovated staircase with countdown clock

=== Exits ===
This station has one elevated station house beneath the center of the platforms and tracks. Two staircases from each platform go down to a crossunder that has a news-stand and small turnstile bank. Outside fare control, there is a token booth and two staircases going down to the northwest and southeast corners of 39th Avenue and 31st Street. The lower base of the platform staircases have emergency gates leading directly to the top of the street stairs.
