= Maureen McQuillan =

American painter

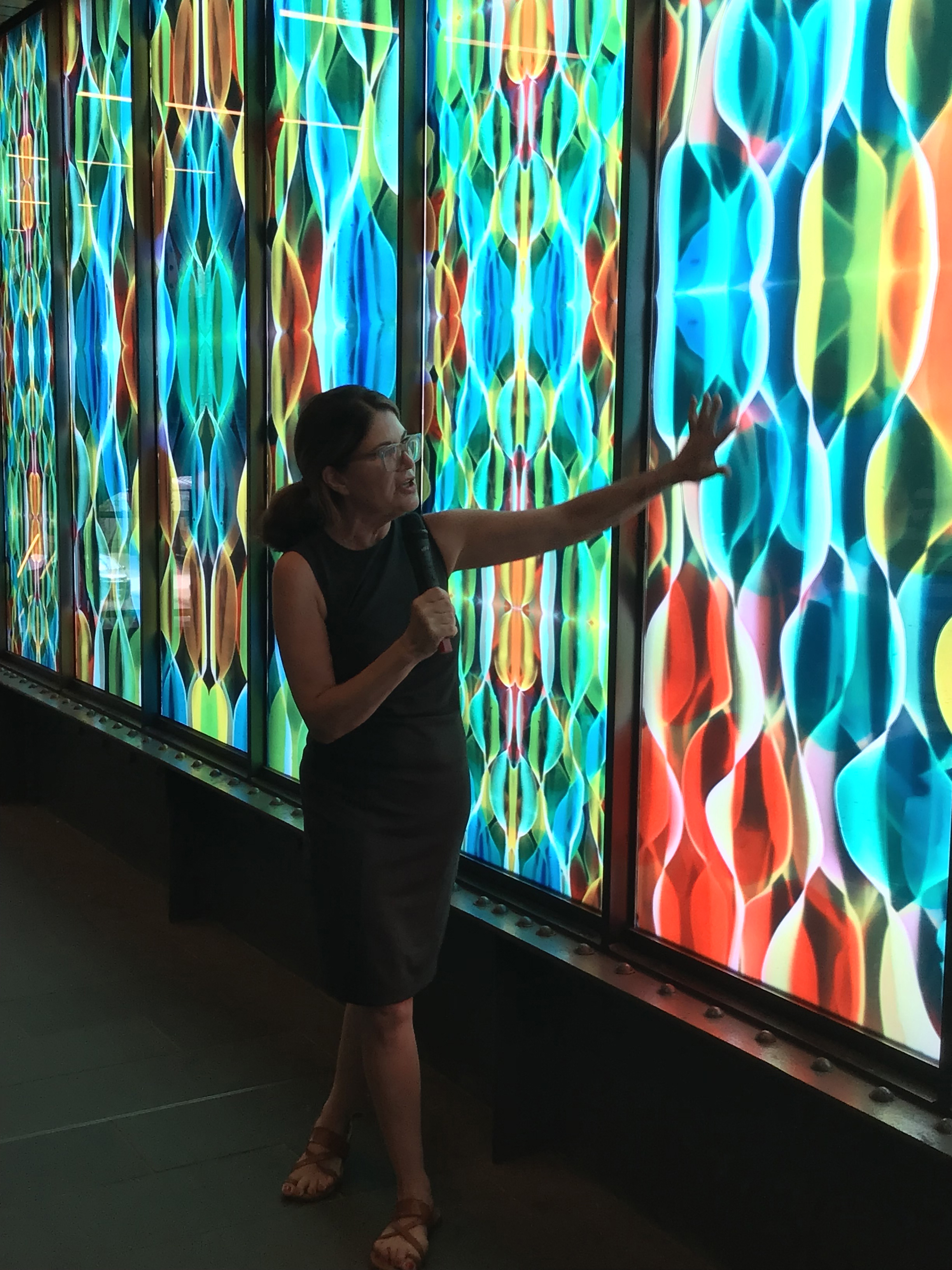
- Born: New York City
- Education: Columbia University; New York Studio School of Drawing, Painting and Sculpture
- Known for: Artist
- Website: maureenmcquillan.com

Maureen McQuillan is a New York-based contemporary artist, who, though primarily a painter, has worked in a range of mediums that include drawing, painting, camera-less photography, and sculptural installation. Across disciplines, she uses color and flowing line to create her complexly patterned abstractions.

== Process and themes ==
=== Recent work ===
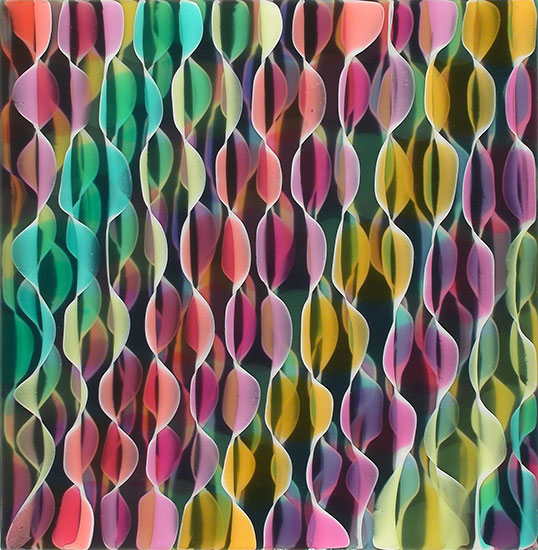
2015 Painting by Maureen McQuillan

McQuillan creates kaleidoscopic abstractions with overlapping layers of translucent color and rippling lines. She takes a systematic approach, applying the ink according to a rigid set of her own rules akin to the structure of a line of music or computer code. In these works, she investigates the subjectivity of color, and how technology mediates and defines our modern perception of it now that the natural phenomenon is so often translated through printer ink or pixels.

While the pieces are handmade, her process results in something that can feel digitally produced. The finished pieces are reminiscent of cellular structure under a microscope or cosmic phenomena through a telescope.

She follows a set of strictly defined rules but embraces unforeseen effects. As she describes it: "As much as I try to follow the rules I made at the outset, my process invariably runs off the rails, and goes off in an unexpected direction. That is not to say I just rely on accidents, because my process is a very directed and restrictive system. It’s just that all plans go awry and all systems go haywire." The translucent overlapping colors combine optically in unexpected ways.

She works on wood panels, layering acrylic polymer, white lines, and translucent ink to create her complicated nets of folding ribbons. The layering creates a sense of luminosity and infinite space. The effect of shifting color and wavering line is subtle and full of movement, described by one critic "as ephemeral-looking as smoke rings."

Although she addresses digital technology, the tangibility of the artwork is essential; some of the spatial effects are achieved through the physical stacking of layers separated by clear medium. The finished pieces are up to 3/4 of an inch thick. Materiality is important to her drawings as well, as critic Helen Harrison explains: "Ms. McQuillan’s ink drawings on resin-coated paper subtly exploit the resistance of the two media, forcing distortions that recall seismic graphs."

=== Monochromatic work ===
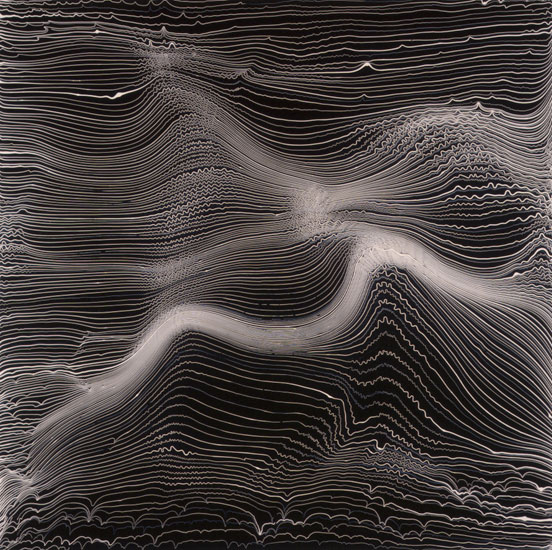
Resin and Ink Drawing by Maureen McQuillan

McQuillan's early work is primarily monochromatic and uses undulating, repetitive lines to create a sense of space and rhythm. Critics have noted the reference to Op Art and commented on the mesmerizing quality of her twisting threads: "There’s no telling how Maureen McQuillan achieves the effect of streamers unfurling through the darkening space… but the result is hypnotic and as delicate as smoke."

The drawings feel both highly structured and organic, which is a result of the process-driven way they are made. As in her later color pieces, she invents a set of arbitrary instructions. They are impossible to follow accurately, and she allows these failings in the human hand to create visual effects. She has worked with printer's ink and resin-coated paper, two materials that resist one another, and the chemical process creates its own distortions. As David Hunt puts it: "Maureen McQuillan's threadlike lines of ink and resin flow across the canvas like jagged tributaries converging in an oceanic center." McQuillan describe her relationship with line thus: "I am fascinated by the seemingly endless possibilities of line, and how I can evoke phenomena of the natural, virtual and artificial worlds via a simple, open, and performative process."

She frequently incorporates skewed and distended grids. The negative and positive spaces are equally important, which increases the effect of spatial ambiguity. While her drawings are non-representational, they bring up numerous schematic associations, from an EKG reading to a weather map to a topographic map. Yet "this is a topography of nothing but the artist's vision." They feel like they chart rational and scientific data, yet the optical effects are so strong and destabilizing, they might seem to describe something bigger and more abstract, like cyberspace. David Shapiro describes one piece as the "so–called stellar nursery where the black holes are born." Her drawings develop tension between pure abstraction and the cognitive impulse to create narrative around an image.

=== Photograms ===
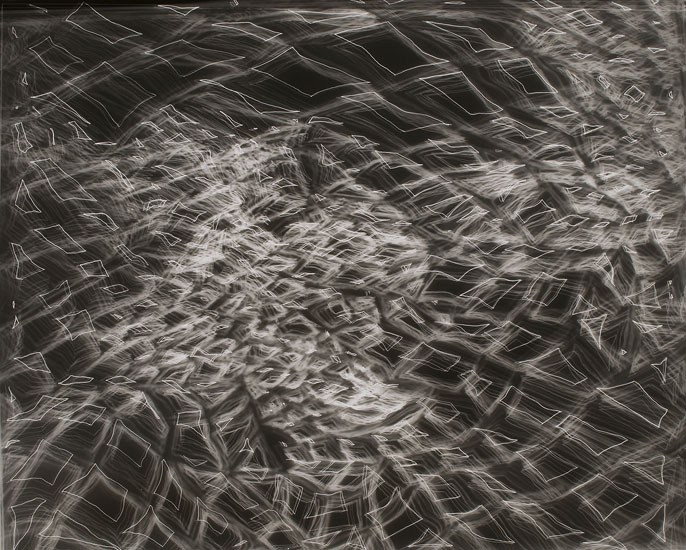
Example of a Photogram by Maureen McQuillan

As an extension of her drawing practice, McQuillan began producing photograms during a 2008 residency at the Islip Art Museum on Long Island, NY. Without a camera, she uses hand-drawn lines and their shadows to create images on photo-sensitive paper. The result is a kind of sculpture translated into two dimensions. The resulting imagery is complicated but the tools required are very simple, just a light bulb, paper and chemicals.

=== Installation ===
She created a site-specific installation at the Contemporary Museum Baltimore called Sensory Forensics. She was inspired by the idea that digital products like scanners and cameras are encoded with tiny flaws that distort their ability to accurately capture and reproduce images. The machines that we think of as creating perfect representations of reality are in fact encoded with errors and defects. The sculptural window installation was made from neon tubing, mylar, and more than a thousand feet of electrical cable.

== Public work ==
In 2018 McQuillan's first major public artwork, Crystal Blue Persuasion, opened at the 36th Avenue Subway Station in Astoria, New York, a permanent commission by MTA Arts & Design. She translated her signature ribbons of vivid color into geometric patterns, and, building on her practice of using clear acrylic mediums, created floor to ceiling laminated glass windows that span three sides of the station and fill the space with natural light. The title is drawn from the 1969 psychedelic rock song by Tommy James. The repetitive patterns capture the monotonous nature of commuting while celebrating the small variations of each day's journey.

== Education ==
Born in New York, McQuillan received a BA in English from Columbia University before attending the New York Studio School of Drawing, Painting and Sculpture. Although she has spent most of her life in New York, she has also lived in Mississippi, Hong Kong, and Miami.

== Career ==
Maureen McQuillan has been showing in the US and internationally since the nineties. Group exhibitions include: The Weatherspoon Art Museum, Greensboro, NC; The Contemporary Museum Baltimore, Maryland; The Drawing Center, NY; The Islip Art Museum, NY; the John Michael Kohler Arts Center, Wisconsin; and Le VOG Contemporary Arts Center, Fontaine and The College of Art and Design, Grenoble, France.

The recipient of numerous awards and residencies, her work is held in public collections across the US and abroad.
