= Astoria Boulevard station =

New York City Subway station in Queens

Astoria Blvd
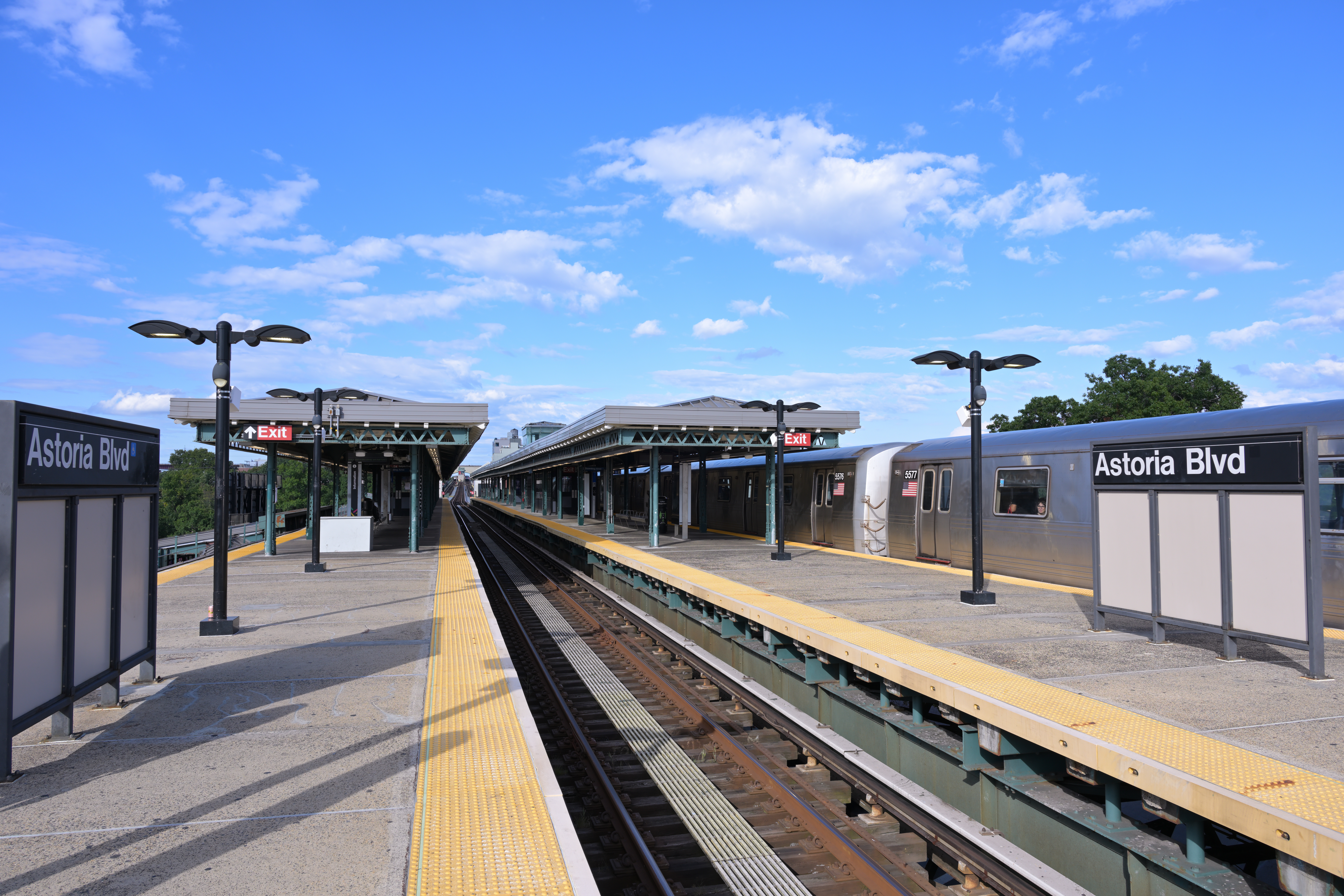

Station statistics
- Address: Astoria Boulevard & 31st Street; Astoria, New York
- Borough: Queens
- Locale: Astoria
- Coordinates: 40.769979°N 73.918161°W
- Division: B (BMT)
- Line: BMT Astoria Line
- Services: N (all times); W (weekdays)
- Transit: NYCT Bus: M60 SBS; MTA Bus: Q19; Columbia Transportation: Queens-Riverdale Commuter Route
- Structure: Elevated
- Platforms: 2 island platforms cross-platform interchange
- Tracks: 3 (2 in regular service)

Other information
- Opened: February 1, 1917; 109 years ago
- Closed: March 17, 2019; 7 years ago (reconstruction)
- Rebuilt: December 18, 2019; 6 years ago
- Accessible: Yes
- Former/other names: Astoria Boulevard–Hoyt Avenue; Hoyt Avenue–Astoria Boulevard; Hoyt Avenue–Astoria Avenue

Traffic
- 2025: 2,603,893 ▲5.7%
- Rank: 146 out of 423
Services
Preceding station	New York City Subway	Following station
30th Avenue N W via 34th Street–Herald Square	Local	Astoria–Ditmars Boulevard N W Terminus
Non-revenue services and lines
Preceding station	New York City Subway	Following station
Queensboro Plaza express	no service	
Location
Location within New York City Subway
Location within New York City
Location within New York
Track layout
Street map
Station service legend
Symbol	Description
Stops all times	Stops all times
Stops weekdays during the day	Stops weekdays during the day

The Astoria Boulevard station (also known as Astoria Boulevard–Hoyt Avenue station) is an express station on the BMT Astoria Line of the New York City Subway. Located on 31st Street between Astoria Boulevard and the Grand Central Parkway (Interstate 278) in Astoria, Queens, the station is served by the N train at all times, as well as by the W train on weekdays.

This station opened in 1917 along with the rest of the Astoria Line as part of the Dual Contracts between New York City and the Brooklyn Rapid Transit Company (BRT).

== History ==
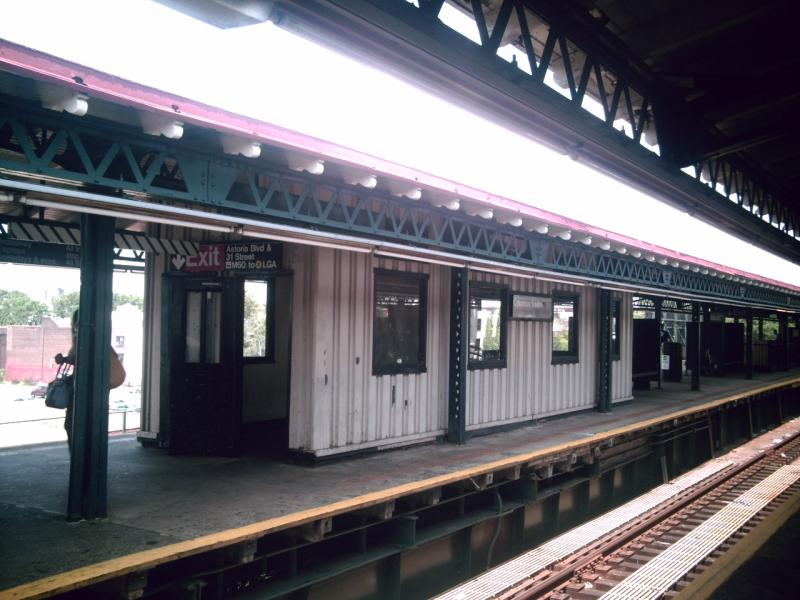
Staircase shelter on southbound platform before 2019 renovation

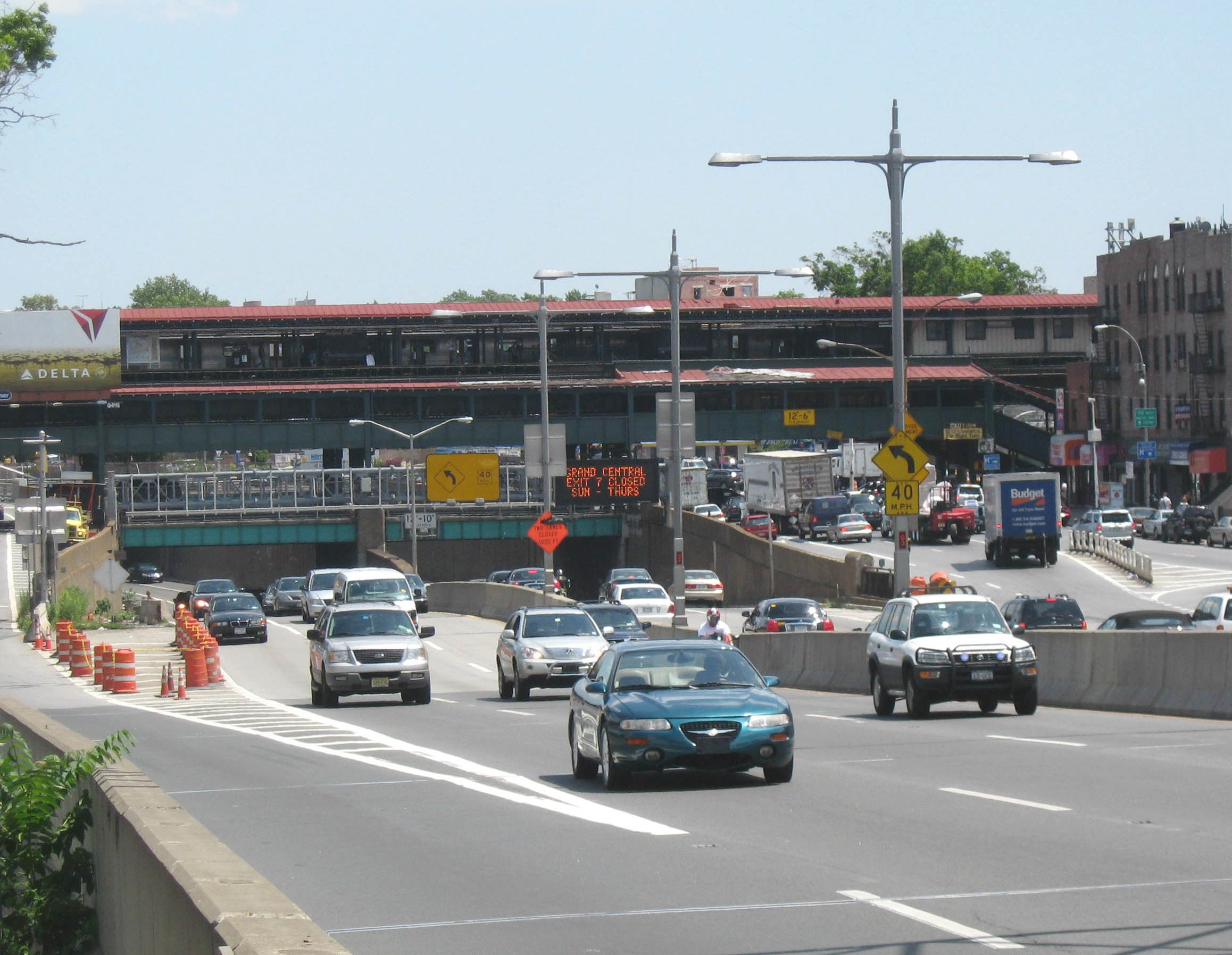
View of station from Triborough Bridge before renovation.

=== Early history ===
This station, originally known as Hoyt Avenue, opened on February 1, 1917, along with the rest of the Astoria Line, which was originally part of the IRT, as a spur off the IRT Queensboro Line, now the IRT Flushing Line. Trains ran between Grand Central and Astoria. On July 23, 1917, the Queensboro Bridge spur of the elevated IRT Second Avenue Line opened. At that time, all elevated trains to Queensboro Plaza used the Astoria Line while all subway trains used the Corona Line, though this was later changed with trains alternating between branches. This station started to be served by BMT shuttles using elevated cars on April 8, 1923.

In December 1923, the Queens Chamber of Commerce petitioned the New York State Transit Commission to add the name "Astoria Avenue" to station signage. The petition was approved by the Chief of the Transit Bureau. Later, enclosed waiting rooms were added to the platforms of this station and the Ditmars Boulevard station. They opened on January 17, 1925.

In 1931, preparation began for the construction of the Grand Central Parkway and the approaches to the Triborough Bridge. The station's original sidewalk entrances were located on the northern corners of the intersection of Hoyt Avenue and 31st Street. However since these stairs fell within the condemned area in the way of the future road underpass, they were removed and replaced with stairs on the southern corners. To compensate for this change, unpaid pedestrian overpasses were constructed connecting the station's mezzanine, the relocated stairs, and new stairs to the street under the north side of the station.

The city government took over the BMT's operations on June 1, 1940, and the IRT's operations on June 12, 1940. On October 17, 1949, the Astoria Line became BMT-only as the tracks at Queensboro Plaza were consolidated and the platforms on the Astoria Line were shaved back to allow through BMT trains to operate on it. Service was initially provided by the Brighton Local (BMT 1) weekdays and the Broadway - Fourth Avenue Local (BMT 2) at all times.

The platforms at this station, along with six others on the Astoria Line, were lengthened to 610 feet (190 m) to accommodate ten-car trains in 1950. The project cost $863,000 (equivalent to $11,548,444 in 2025). Signals on the line had to be modified to take into account the platform extensions.

=== Notable incidents ===
The Astoria Boulevard station's mezzanine sits above an access point to a major truck route, Interstate 278. Accordingly, there have been incidents involving vehicles striking the structure. On the evening of March 27, 1991, a truck struck the bottom of the station and severely damaged a transverse girder, part of which supported the center express track. The affected track was taken out of service for two days until repairs were made to the structure.

Several years later, on the morning of May 1, 1998, a backhoe working underneath the station (not performing New York City Transit-related work) struck the mezzanine, ripping out three support beams while damaging four more and creating a large hole in the floor. There were no injuries, but trains bypassed the station at restricted speed. Cleanup work began immediately and by noon, the slow speed restriction was removed. By 3:00 p.m., a temporary wooden floor was installed. Less than eight hours from the time of the first response, the station was back in full service. Permanent repairs were made overnight.

=== Reconstruction and accessibility improvements ===
As part of the 2015–2019 MTA Capital Program, the station received funding for reconstruction to make it compliant with the Americans With Disabilities Act of 1990. A contract for the reconstruction was awarded in June 2018, and substantial completion was projected for November 2020. In September 2018, work began adding four elevators; two connect the street and mezzanine, and two more connect the mezzanine with the platforms. In order to construct the street elevators, the station mezzanine was demolished and rebuilt. The new mezzanine was raised to reduce strikes by trucks driving underneath. The station was fully closed for nine months on March 17, 2019 to allow the mezzanine to be replaced and was reopened on December 18, 2019, while elevator construction and installation was still underway. On July 24, 2020, the elevators were placed into operation, making the station ADA accessible.

In January 2023, it was announced that to further improve accessibility, wide-aisle fare gates will be installed at this station and at four others across the city. The Metropolitan Transportation Authority plans to work with Cubic to design a gate that will accommodate both the MetroCard and OMNY payment systems, and allow easier station access for passengers with large items such as strollers, mobility devices, and luggage. The new fare gates were not installed immediately; in October 2026, the MTA announced plans to install taller fare gates with glass panels at 20 additional stations, including the Astoria Boulevard station, after the gates had been successfully piloted at earlier stations.

== Station layout ==
The elevated station has three tracks and two island platforms. The center track is not used in revenue service, but it had been used regularly as recently as 2002.

The station has wooden canopies with transite and wooden mezzanines. The northbound platform's benches are surrounded by low windscreen on three sides. The southbound platform bears the tertiary name of Columbus Square, for a small park containing a statue of Columbus by Angelo Racioppi immediately east of the southeastern stair of the station. It also has an enclosed waiting area.

As part of the MTA Arts & Design program, Jeffrey Gibson created an artwork for the station, titled I Am A Rainbow Too (stylized in all-capital letters), which was installed in 2020. The work includes over 100 laminated glass panels, The artwork includes depictions of the moon, sun, and stars, which are decorated in the colors of a rainbow.

=== Exits ===
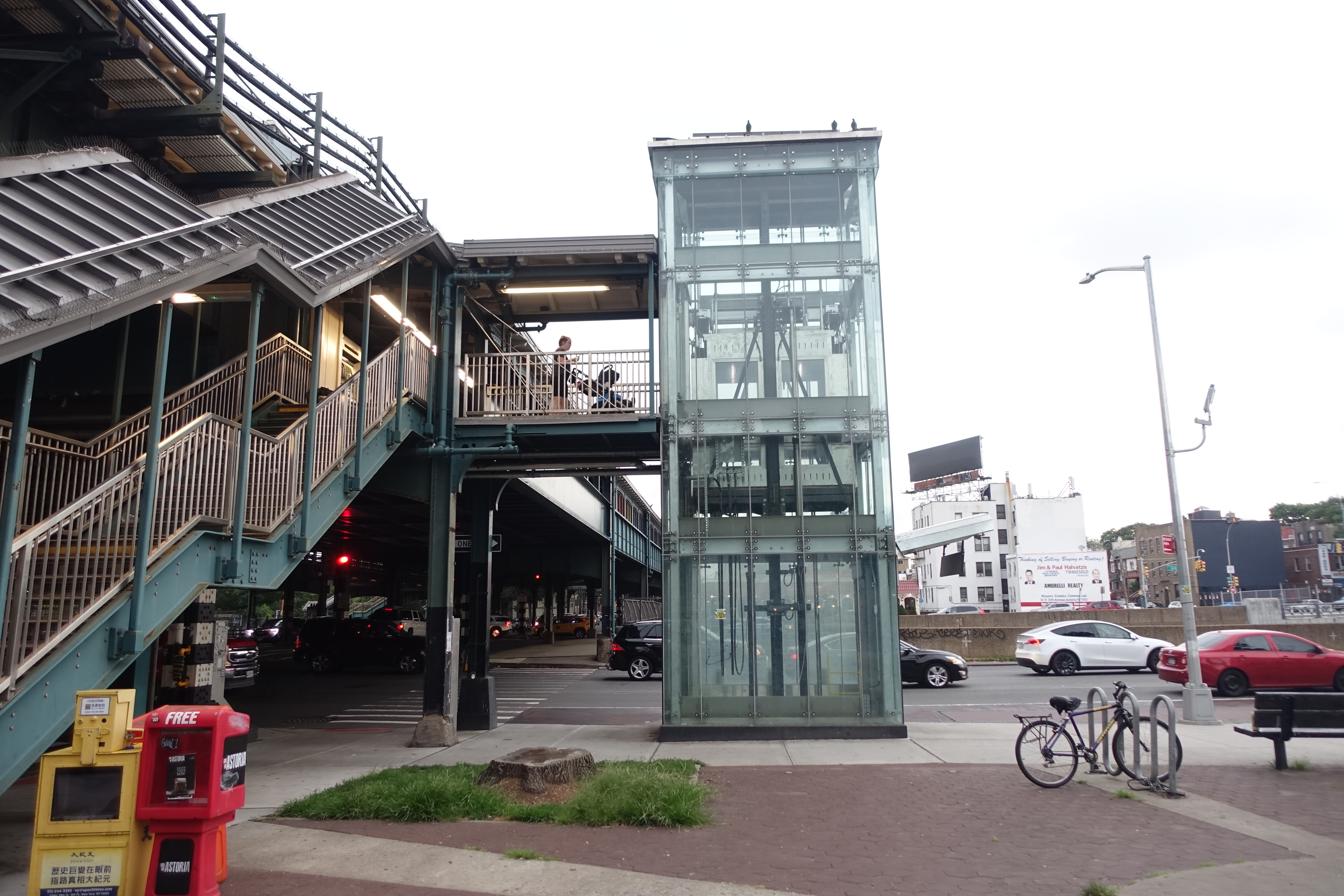
ADA-compliant elevator and staircase to the station

There are four exits to the station: two to either northern corner of Hoyt Avenue North and 31st Street (via overpass), and two to either southern corner of Hoyt Avenue South and 31st Street. The stair to the northwest corner of Hoyt Avenue North and 31st Street was demolished and reconstructed to run parallel to Hoyt Avenue instead of 31st Street; the stair's original orientation was replaced with an elevator.

From the station's platforms, the Hell Gate Bridge and Hell Gate Line viaduct to the north, the Robert F. Kennedy Bridge to the west, and the Grand Central Parkway/Interstate 278 and Hoyt Avenue underneath are visible. The mezzanine has separate turnstile banks from each side with crossunders from the platform stairs.
