= 30th Avenue station =

New York City Subway station in Queens

30 Avenue
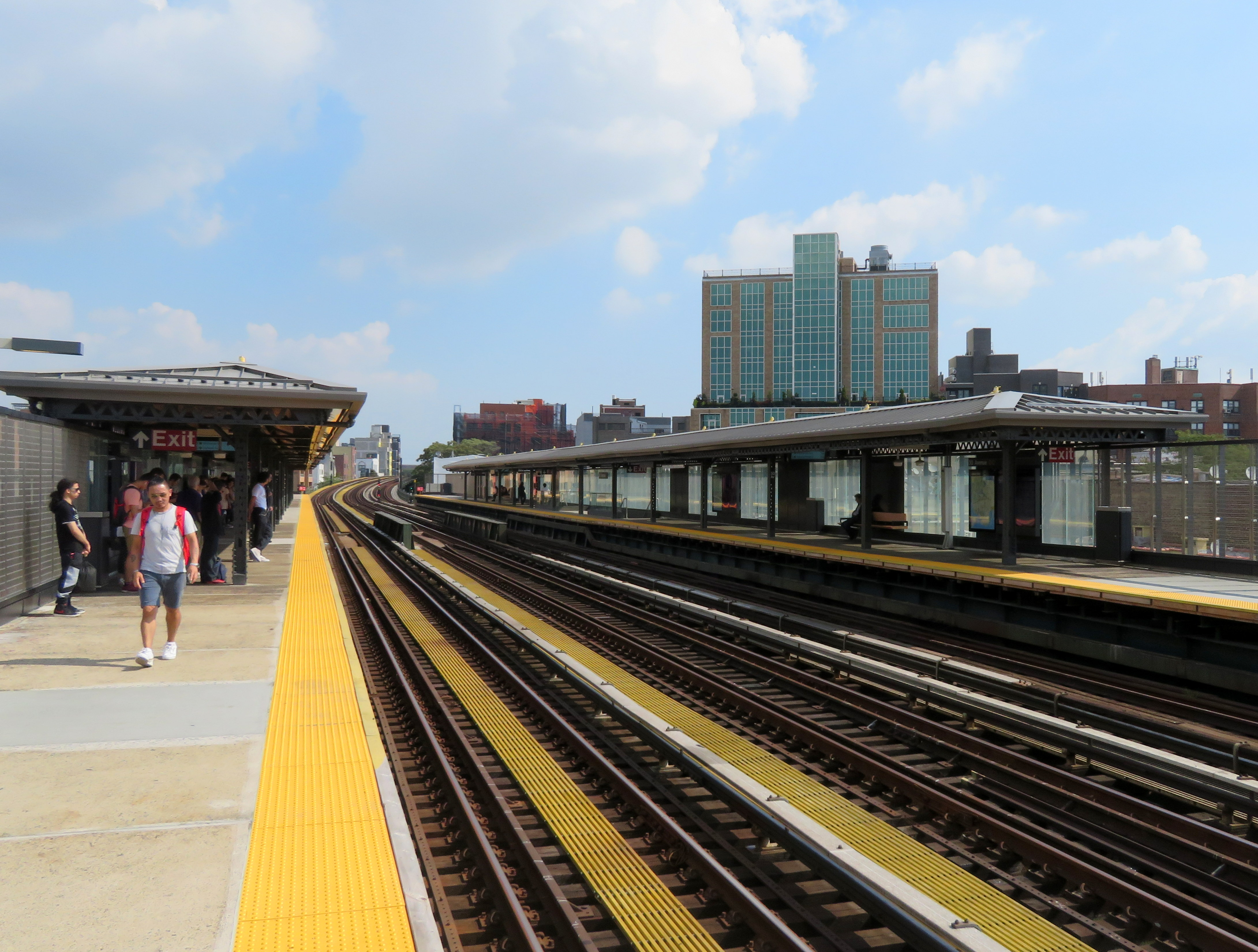
- View from southbound platform

Station statistics
- Address: 30th Avenue & 31st Street; Astoria, New York
- Borough: Queens
- Locale: Astoria
- Coordinates: 40.766859°N 73.921423°W
- Division: B (BMT)
- Line: BMT Astoria Line
- Services: N (all times); W (weekdays)
- Transit: MTA Bus: Q18
- Structure: Elevated
- Platforms: 2 side platforms
- Tracks: 3 (2 in regular service)

Other information
- Opened: February 1, 1917; 109 years ago
- Closed: October 23, 2017; 9 years ago (reconstruction)
- Rebuilt: June 22, 2018; 8 years ago
- Former/other names: 30th Avenue–Grand Avenue

Traffic
- 2025: 3,355,303 ▲8.1%
- Rank: 110 out of 423
Services
Preceding station	New York City Subway	Following station
Broadway N W via 34th Street–Herald Square	Local	Astoria Boulevard N W toward Astoria–Ditmars Boulevard
Location
Location within New York City Subway
Location within New York City
Location within New York
Track layout
Street map
Station service legend
Symbol	Description
Stops all times	Stops all times
Stops weekdays during the day	Stops weekdays during the day

The 30th Avenue station (formerly known as the 30th Avenue–Grand Avenue station) is a local station on the BMT Astoria Line of the New York City Subway. It is located at 30th Avenue and 31st Street in Astoria. The station is served by the N train at all times, as well as by the W train on weekdays.

== History ==
This station opened on February 1, 1917, along with the rest of the Astoria Line, which was originally part of the IRT, as a spur off the IRT Queensboro Line, which is now the IRT Flushing Line. Trains ran between Grand Central and Astoria. On July 23, 1917, the Queensboro Bridge spur of the elevated IRT Second Avenue Line opened. At that time, all elevated trains to Queensboro Plaza used the Astoria Line while all subway trains used the IRT Flushing Line, though this was later changed with trains alternating between branches. This station started to be served by BMT shuttles using elevated cars on April 8, 1923.

The city government took over the BMT's operations on June 1, 1940, and the IRT's operations on June 12, 1940. On October 17, 1949, the Astoria Line became BMT-only as the tracks at Queensboro Plaza were consolidated and the platforms on the Astoria Line were shaved back to allow BMT trains to operate on it. Service was initially provided by the Brighton Local (BMT 1) and the Broadway–Fourth Avenue Local (BMT 2) at all times.

=== Station renovations ===
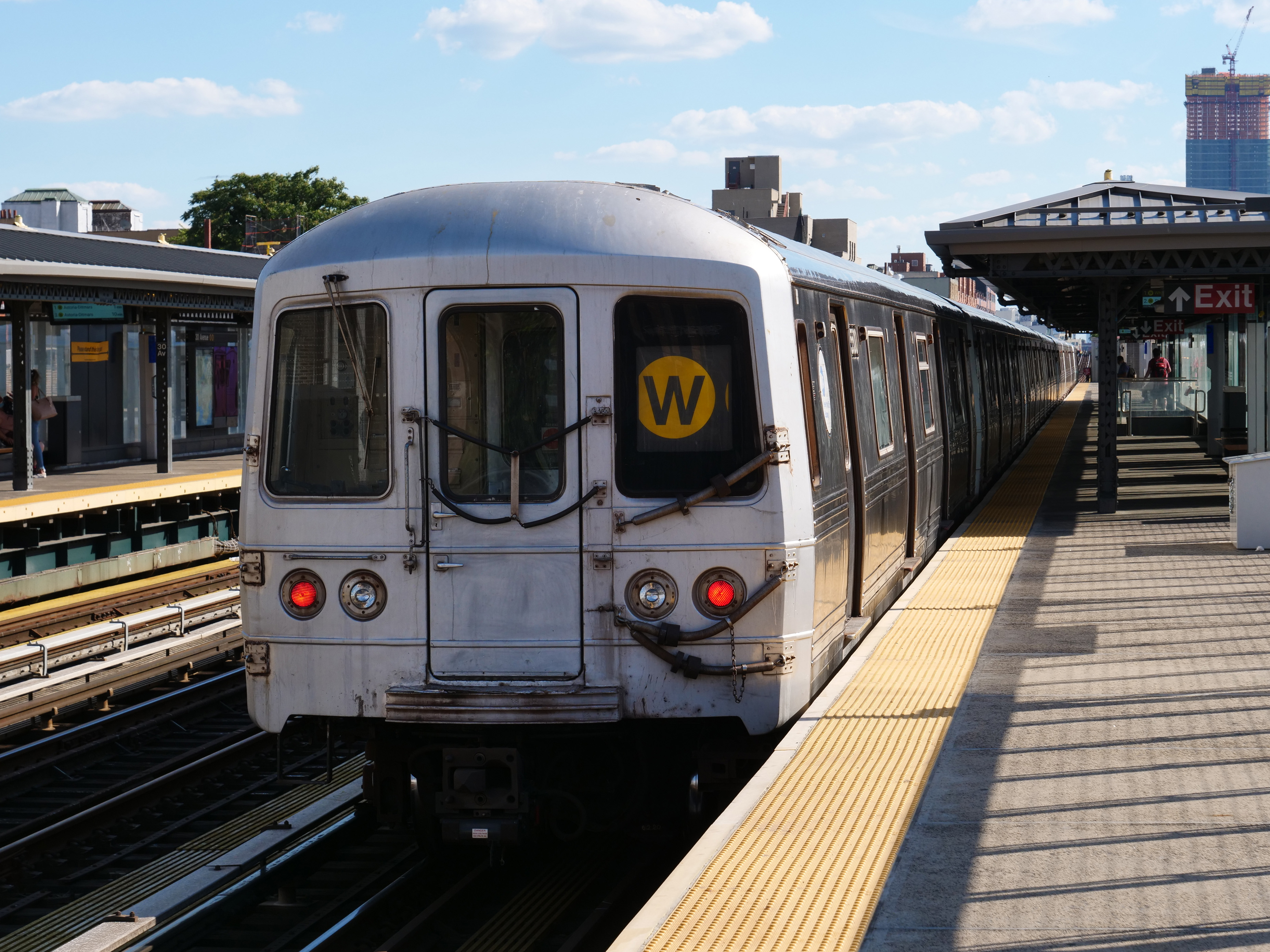
A Manhattan-bound W train of R46s leaving the station

The platforms at this station, along with six others on the Astoria Line, were lengthened to 610 feet (190 m) to accommodate ten-car trains in 1950. The project cost $863,000. Signals on the line had to be modified to take the platform extensions into account.

Under the 2015–2019 MTA Capital Plan, the station underwent a complete overhaul as part of the Enhanced Station Initiative and was entirely closed for several months. Updates included cellular service, Wi-Fi, USB charging stations, interactive service advisories and maps. The award for Package 2 of the renovations, which covered renovations at the 30th Avenue, Broadway, 36th Avenue, and 39th Avenue stations, was awarded on April 14, 2017, to Skanska USA. This station, along with 36th Avenue, was closed entirely for around eight months starting on October 23, 2017. After the 30th Avenue and 36th Avenue stations closed, there was some controversy over the loss of business near these stations. The stations reopened on June 22, 2018. In July 2018, the MTA retroactively awarded a contract for the additional platform and girder repairs at the 30th and 36th Avenues stations, conducted after the stations had reopened.

== Station layout ==
This elevated station has two side platforms and three tracks. The center track is not used in revenue service, but it had been used regularly as recently as 2002.

The platforms are narrower at their south ends. The ends of each platform contain full-height mesh windscreens, while the center of the platform contains glass windscreens and black metal canopies. Prior to the 2018 renovations, both platforms had creme-colored corrugated windscreens for their entire lengths and red wooden canopies at the platforms' centers.

As part of the MTA Arts & Design program, Stephen Westfall created an artwork for the station, titled Perasma I and II; Dappleganger, which was installed in 2018. The artwork consists of 47 laminated glass panels in the mezzanine, each with geometric designs. According to the MTA, the panels were intended to "rhythmically invoke universality alongside cultural identity".

=== Exits ===
This station's only mezzanine is an elevated wooden station house beneath the center of the platforms and tracks. It has a turnstile bank and two staircases for each platform. A crossunder is behind the token booth on the north side. A passageway on each side behind the platform stairs leads to a staircase going down to either southern corners of 31st Street and 30th Avenue. Two staircases on the other side go down to the northern corners. An exit-only stair from the northbound platform descends to the southeastern corner of Newtown Avenue and 31st Street.
