= BMT Astoria Line =

New York City Subway line

- The N and W train services use the entire BMT Astoria Line.

Overview
- Owner: City of New York
- Locale: Queens, New York City
- Termini: Ditmars Boulevard; Queensboro Plaza
- Stations: 7

Service
- Type: Rapid transit
- System: New York City Subway
- Operator: New York City Transit Authority
- Daily ridership: 47,522

History
- Opened: April 21, 1917; 109 years ago

Technical
- Num of tracks: 2-3
- Character: Elevated
- Track gauge: 4 ft 8 1/2 in (1,435 mm)
- Electrification: 600V DC third rail
Route map
Express station	Local station

The BMT Astoria Line (formerly the IRT Astoria Line) is a rapid transit line in the B Division of the New York City Subway, serving the Queens neighborhood of Astoria. It runs south from Ditmars Boulevard in Astoria to 39th Avenue in Long Island City above 31st Street. It then turns west and serves Queensboro Plaza over Queens Plaza.

The entire line is served by the N train at all times, joined by the W train only on weekdays during the day. It was built as part of the Dual Contracts and jointly operated by the Interborough Rapid Transit Company (IRT) and Brooklyn–Manhattan Transit Corporation (BMT) using IRT-sized cars until 1949, when the platforms were shaved to accept the wider BMT cars and joint service was discontinued.

== Description and service ==
All services make all stops on the BMT Astoria Line.

	Time period	
	Weekdays	Late nights and weekends
"N" train	full line	
"W" train	full line	no service

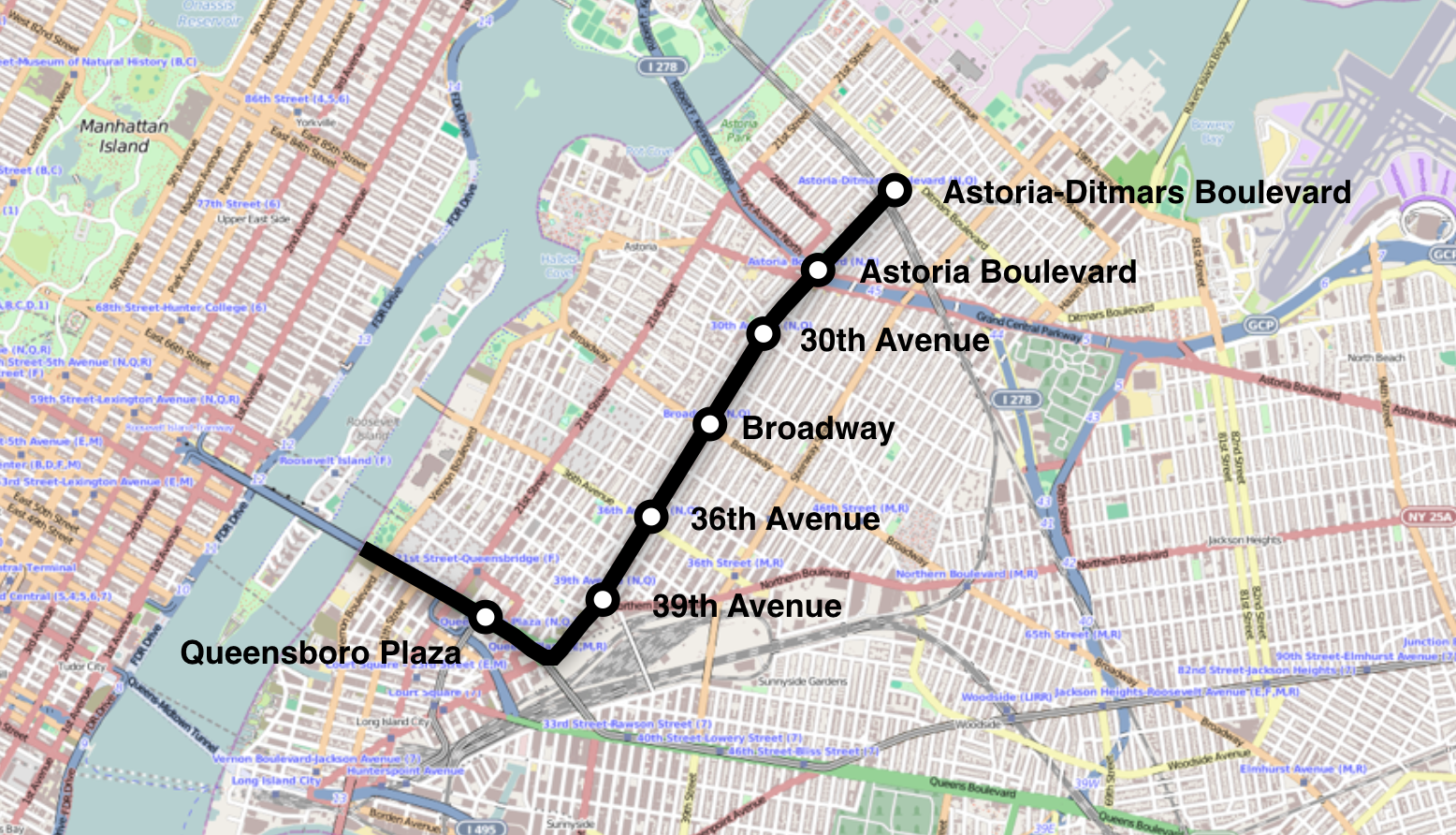
Overview of the BMT Astoria Line

The north end of the Astoria Line is a two-track terminal at Ditmars Boulevard, with one island platform. South of the station, the center express track, currently not used in revenue service, begins (with crossovers to allow terminating trains to reach the correct track). The next station, Astoria Boulevard, is the only express station on the three-track section. The next four stations are local ones with two side platforms.

South of 39th Avenue, the express track merges with the two outer tracks. The line then curves west and enters Queensboro Plaza, a dual-level station with northbound trains on the upper level, southbound trains on the lower level, and cross-platform transfers to the IRT Flushing Line. Crossover tracks exist between the upper-level tracks just north of the station, one of a few connections between the BMT / IND and IRT. After Queensboro Plaza, the line ramps underground, and merges with the 60th Street Tunnel Connection to become the BMT Broadway Line via the 60th Street Tunnel to Manhattan.

== History ==
=== Opening ===
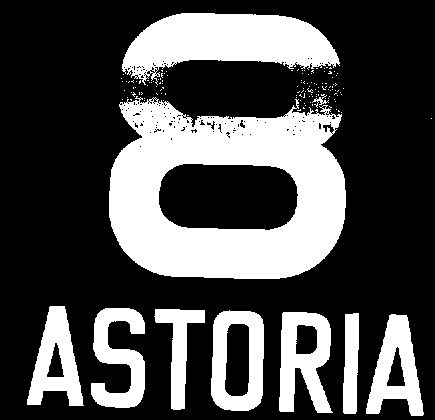
Unused R12 label for the "8" Astoria route.

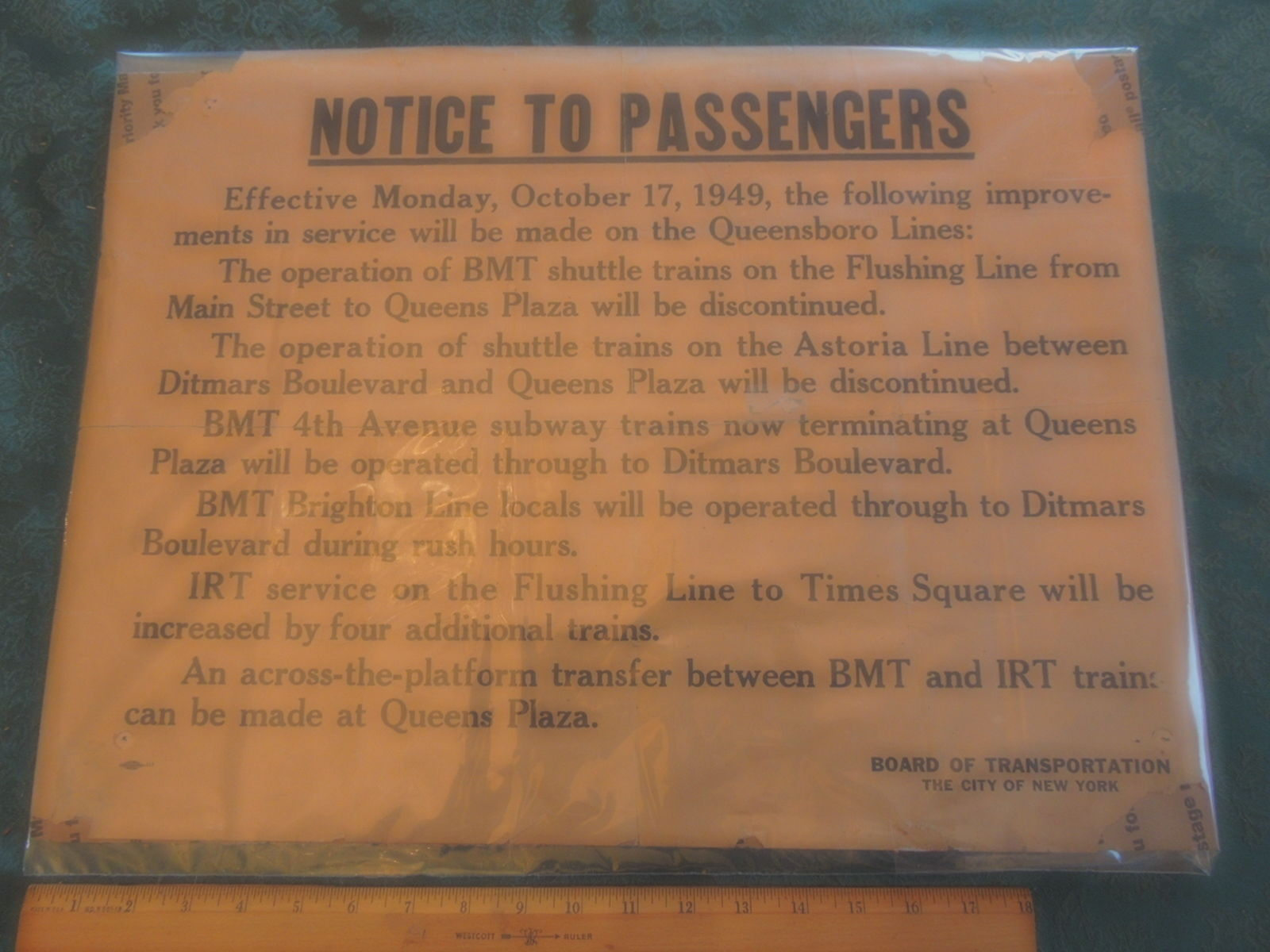
A poster describing the changes at Queensborough Plaza in 1949

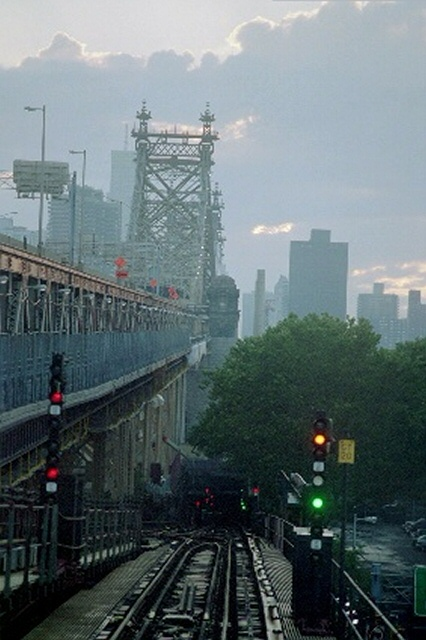
Entrance to the 60th Street Tunnel

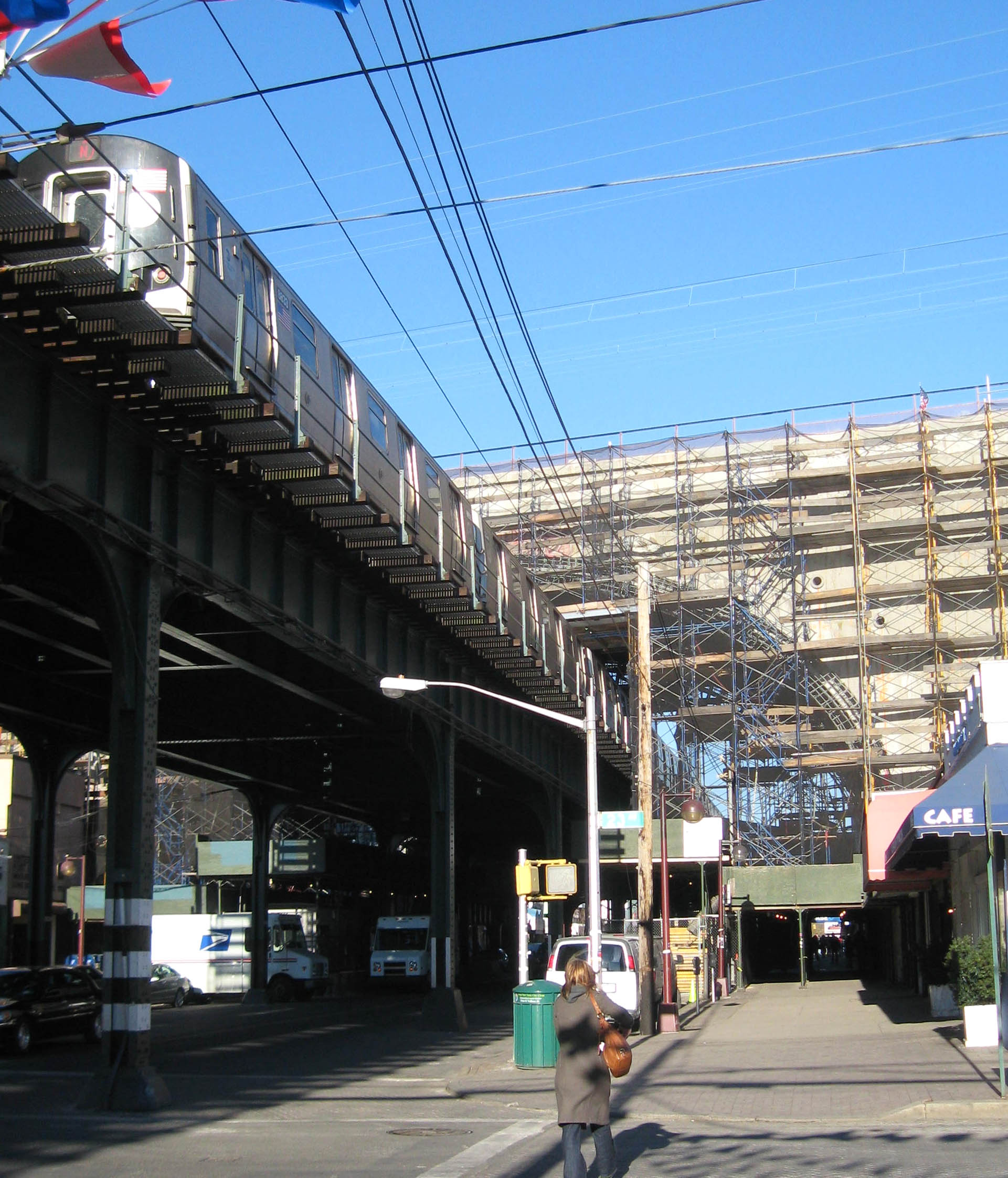
Passing under New York Connecting Railroad

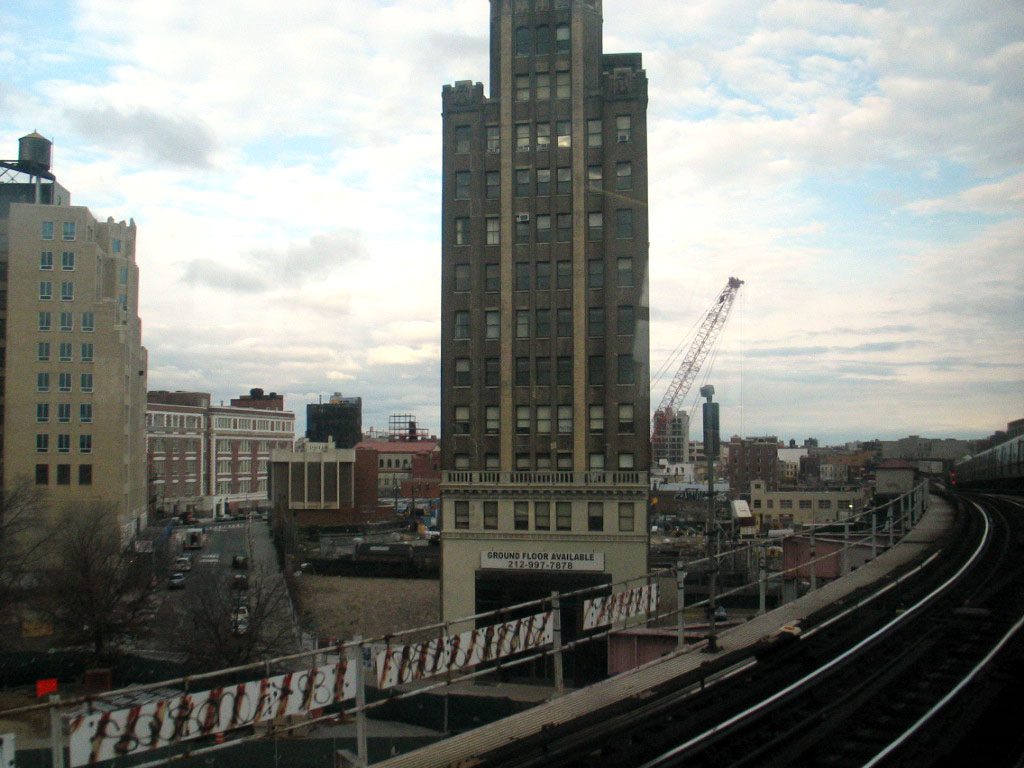
Northbound curve on the Astoria line east of Queensboro Plaza station

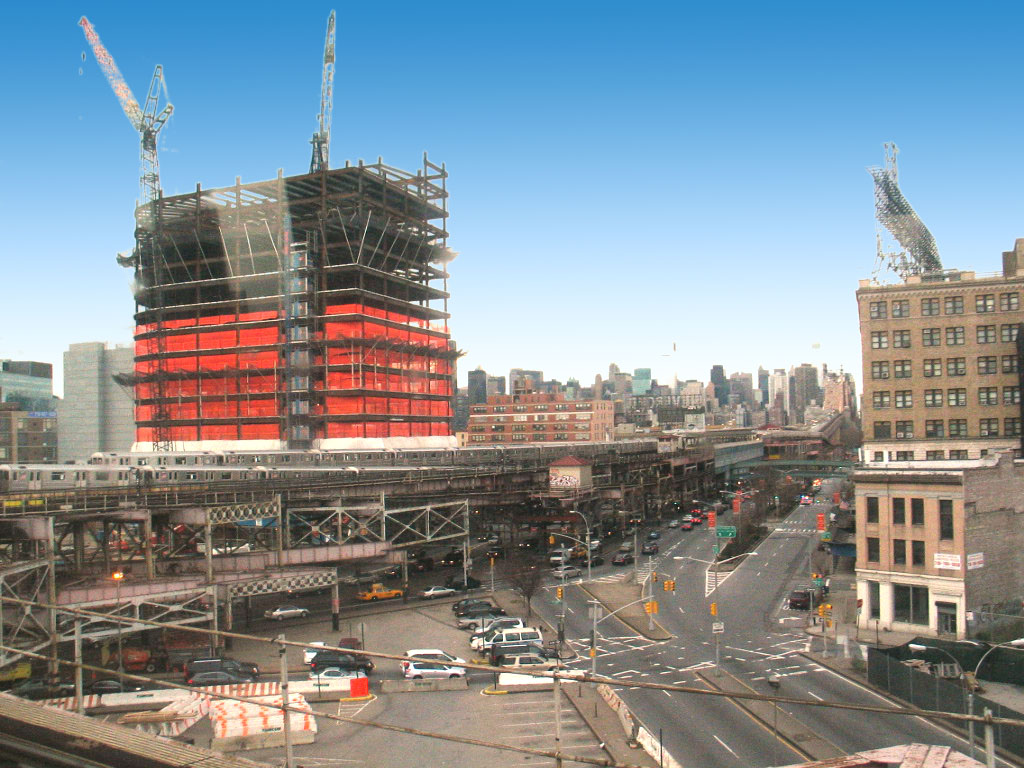
Queensboro Plaza station as seen from a southbound Astoria line train

The Astoria Line was originally part of the Second Avenue Elevated Line, eventually purchased by the Interborough Rapid Transit Company (IRT). Manhattan-bound trains went over the 59th Street (Queensboro) Bridge, then turned south on Second Avenue, joining up with the main line of the Second Avenue Elevated to City Hall and South Ferry. Later the Astoria line was made a spur off the IRT Queensboro Line, now the IRT Flushing Line. The whole line north of Queensboro Plaza opened on February 1, 1917 and was used by trains between Grand Central and Astoria. Through IRT service to the Corona Line (now the Flushing Line) began two months later on April 21.

On July 23, 1917, the Queensboro Bridge spur of the elevated IRT Second Avenue Line opened. At that time, all elevated trains to Queensboro Plaza used the Astoria Line while all subway trains used the Corona Line, though this was later changed with trains alternating between branches.

The 60th Street Tunnel opened on August 1, 1920, allowing BMT trains to reach Queensboro Plaza. However, the stations on the Astoria and Corona Lines were built to IRT specifications, whose platforms were too wide for BMT rolling stock. As a result, those trains terminated at Queensboro Plaza using a relay track east of the station to reverse direction for the return trip to Manhattan.

On April 8, 1923, the BMT, using elevated cars, started running shuttles along the Astoria (numbered BMT 8 in 1924) and Corona Lines (BMT 9) in addition to the existing IRT service. On June 23, 1942, the IRT Second Avenue Line spur to Queensboro Plaza closed.

The IRT services were numbered in 1948, with 7 being assigned to the Flushing Line and 8 to the Astoria Line.

=== Modifications ===
On July 24, 1949, through service between the Astoria Line and the IRT Times Square station was discontinued. On October 17, 1949, the Flushing Line became IRT-only. The platforms on the Astoria Line were shaved back to allow through BMT trains to operate on it, the first ones being the Brighton Local (BMT 1) weekdays & Broadway - Fourth Avenue Local (BMT 2) at all times. Since then, the Astoria Line has hosted the northern end of various services running from Brooklyn through Manhattan; see B, N, Q, R, T and W for details.

The platforms at the seven stations on the Astoria Line were lengthened to 610 feet (190 m) to accommodate ten-car (60 foot) trains in 1950. The project cost $863,000. Signals on the line had to be modified to take into account the platform extensions.

As part of an 18-month capital budget that took effect on January 1, 1963, the wooden platforms at the stations on the Astoria Line were replaced with concrete platforms.

The 2015–2019 MTA Capital Plan called for the Astoria Line's 30th Avenue, Broadway, 36th Avenue, and 39th Avenue stations, along with 29 others, to undergo a complete overhaul as part of the Enhanced Station Initiative. Updates included cellular service, Wi-Fi, USB charging stations, interactive service advisories and maps, improved signage, and improved station lighting. The 30th and 36th Avenues stations were renovated first, from October 2017 to June 2018. After these two stations were reopened, the Broadway and 39th Avenue stations were renovated from July 2018 to January 2019. The remaining stations on the line, Astoria Boulevard and Astoria-Ditmars Boulevard, are also simultaneously undergoing renovations. Astoria-Ditmars Boulevard was renovated from April 2018 to June 2019 and would remain open during this time. However, the Astoria Boulevard station was closed from March 2019 until late 2019. Astoria Boulevard's mezzanine was torn down and replaced, and elevators were added at the station.

== Extension proposals ==
A 1920s Transit Commission study proposed extending the line northwest across or under Randalls and Wards Islands back into Manhattan as a crosstown line at 125th Street, roughly following the route of what is now the Triborough Bridge. As part of the IND Second System plan from 1929, the BMT/IRT Astoria Line would be extended east via Ditmars Boulevard, Astoria Boulevard, 112th Street, and Nassau Boulevard (today's Long Island Expressway) terminating at Cross Island Boulevard. The new line that would have been an extension of the Astoria Line would be called the Long Island City-Horace Harding Boulevard Line. The line would have been two tracks to Astoria Boulevard, and afterward, it would become a four-track line before going back to two tracks at Parsons Boulevard. The entire line would be elevated except for a short section which would have been depressed under Nassau Boulevard. The line would have been extended 8.1 miles at a cost of $17.7 million.

In 1998, an extension of the BMT Astoria Line to LaGuardia Airport was planned as part of a $1.2 billion package to provide access to the New York City airports with funding from the MTA, the Port Authority and the city. The preferred route would have extended the Astoria Line along 31st Street north onto Con Edison's property at the edge of Astoria and then east along 19th Avenue to the Marine Air Terminal. The MTA also considered an eastward extension along Ditmars Boulevard, and a plan to reroute LaGuardia-bound trains from Queensboro Plaza through the Sunnyside rail yard and along the eastern edge of St. Michael’s Cemetery to elevated tracks parallel to the Grand Central Parkway. A fourth route was to have trains turn east via Astoria Boulevard. All of the options would have new elevated sections built. $645 million for the LaGuardia extension was included in the MTA's 2000–2004 Five-Year Capital Plan, and in late 2002, Mayor Bloomberg supported the extension. These options were studied in the LaGuardia Airport Subway Access Study. Community opposition was strong and therefore the plan was canceled in July 2003; however, in 2021 it was being reconsidered after New York governor Kathy Hochul requested the Port Authority find alternatives to the AirTrain LaGuardia project.

The Regional Plan Association, in its Fourth Plan in 2017, anticipated that the population of Astoria would quickly grow over the next three decades, and so called for the Astoria Line to be extended to a new storage yard at Ditmars Boulevard and 20th Street, which would provide added capacity. In addition, a new station at 21st Avenue and 20th Street would improve access for the currently underserved but dense northwest parts of Astoria.

== Station listing ==
Station service legend
Stops all times	Stops 24 hours a day
Stops all times except late nights	Stops every day during daytime hours only
Stops weekdays during the day	Stops during weekday daytime hours only
Stops rush hours in the peak direction only	Stops during weekday rush hours in the peak direction only
Time period details
Disabled access	Station is compliant with the Americans with Disabilities Act
↑	Station is compliant with the Americans with Disabilities Act in the indicated direction only
↓	Station is compliant with the Americans with Disabilities Act in the indicated direction only
	Elevator access to mezzanine only

Neighborhood (approximate)	Disabled access	Station	Tracks	Services	Opened	Transfers and notes
Astoria		Astoria–Ditmars Boulevard		N W	February 1, 1917	originally Ditmars Avenue
Astoria	Center Express track begins (No Regular Service)					
Astoria	Disabled access	Astoria Boulevard	all	N W	February 1, 1917	originally Hoyt Avenue; M60 Select Bus Service to LaGuardia Airport
Astoria		30th Avenue	local	N W	February 1, 1917	originally Grand Avenue
Astoria		Broadway	local	N W	February 1, 1917	
Astoria		36th Avenue	local	N W	February 1, 1917	originally Washington Avenue
Long Island City		39th Avenue	local	N W	February 1, 1917	originally Beebe Avenue; Also known as Dutch Kills
Long Island City	Center Express track ends					
Long Island City	connecting tracks to IRT Flushing Line (No regular service)					
Long Island City	Disabled access	Queensboro Plaza	all	N W	February 1, 1917	7 <7> (IRT Flushing Line)
merges with the 60th Street Tunnel Connection (R ) and becomes the BMT Broadway Line via the 60th Street Tunnel (N R W )
