= Diane Carr =

American artist (born 1946)

Diane Carr is an artist known for her relief sculptures incorporating natural materials and forms.

== Career ==
Associated with the Cass Corridor artist, he works are small scale reliefs, rectangular in format, and constructed of layers of organic materials. Later works (1990s onward) are notable for their increased size and curvilinear forms. She was a Guest Lecturer for Cranbrook Academy of Art in Bloomfield Hills, Michigan. The next year, Carr worked as a Painting Coordinator for Ox Bow Summer Workshop in Saugatuck, Michigan. The following year she was a Visiting Artist at Wesleyan University in Bloomington, Indiana.

In 1985, Carr was a recipient of the Creative Artist Award given by the Michigan Council for the Arts. Her work is in the Detroit Institute of Arts.
