= Astoria–Ditmars Boulevard station =

New York City Subway station in Queens

Astoria–Ditmars Blvd
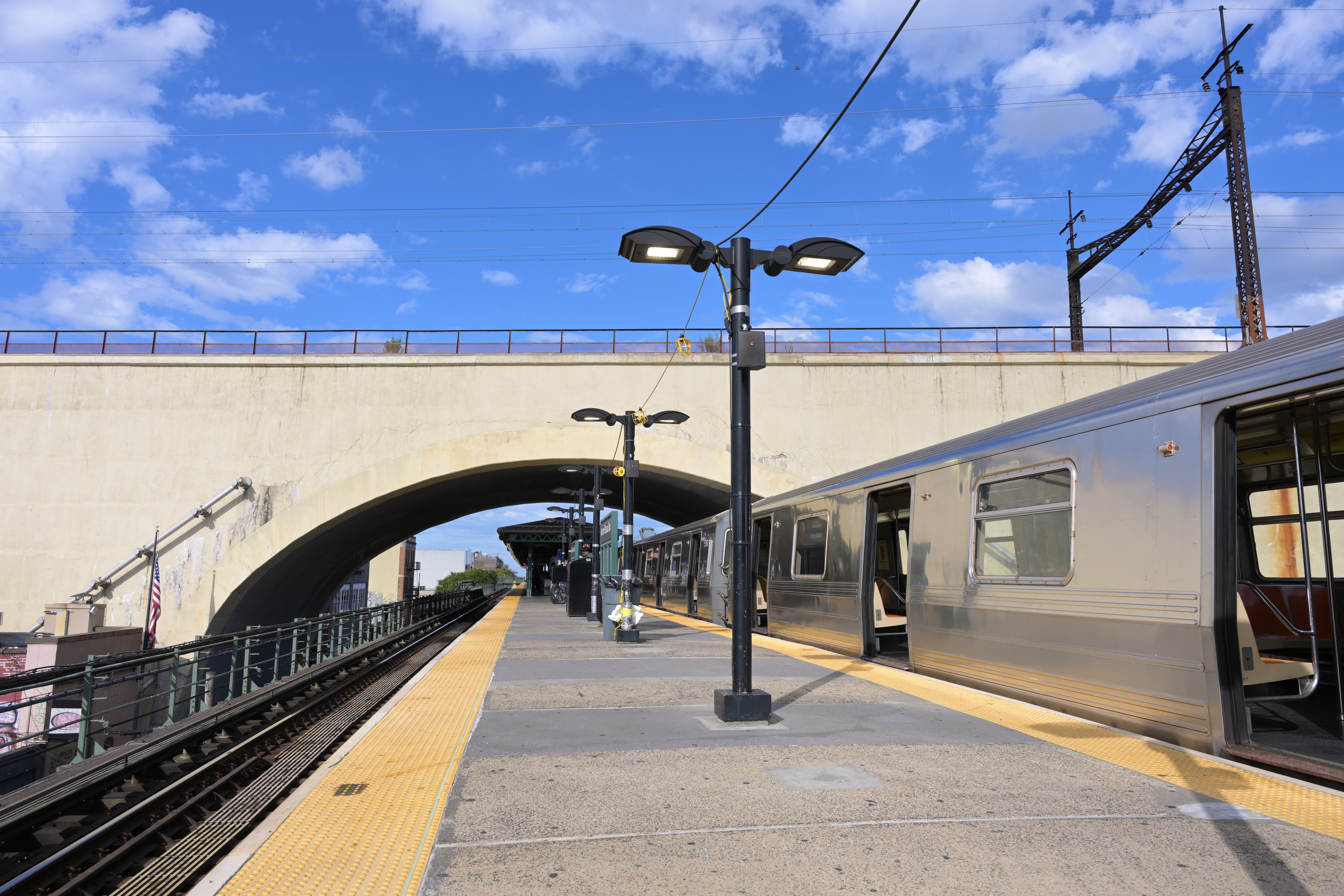
- An R68A N train stopped at the platform

Station statistics
- Address: 23rd Avenue, Ditmars Boulevard and 31st Street; Astoria, New York
- Borough: Queens
- Locale: Astoria
- Coordinates: 40.776089°N 73.910737°W
- Division: B (BMT)
- Line: BMT Astoria Line
- Services: N (all times); W (weekdays)
- Transit: MTA Bus: Q69, Q100 (at 20th Avenue)
- Structure: Elevated
- Platforms: 1 island platform
- Tracks: 2

Other information
- Opened: February 1, 1917; 109 years ago
- Former/other names: Ditmars Avenue

Traffic
- 2025: 3,510,873 ▲6.2%
- Rank: 101 out of 423
Services
Preceding station	New York City Subway	Following station
Astoria Boulevard N W via 34th Street–Herald Square	Local	Terminus
Location
Location within New York City Subway
Location within New York City
Location within New York
Track layout
Street map
Station service legend
Symbol	Description
Stops all times	Stops all times
Stops weekdays during the day	Stops weekdays during the day

The Astoria–Ditmars Boulevard station (originally the Ditmars Avenue station; also Ditmars Boulevard station), is the northern terminal station on the BMT Astoria Line of the New York City Subway. Located above 31st Street between 23rd Avenue and Ditmars Boulevard in Astoria, Queens, it is served by the N train at all times and the W train on weekdays.

The Astoria–Ditmars Boulevard station opened on February 1, 1917, as part of the initial segment of the IRT Astoria Line. In 2018 and 2019, this station was renovated along with six others on the Astoria Line.

This station has two tracks and an island platform. It is partially under the New York Connecting Railroad (NYCR) viaduct, which also carries the tracks of Amtrak's Northeast Corridor. Most of the platform is north of the viaduct.

== History ==
=== Opening ===
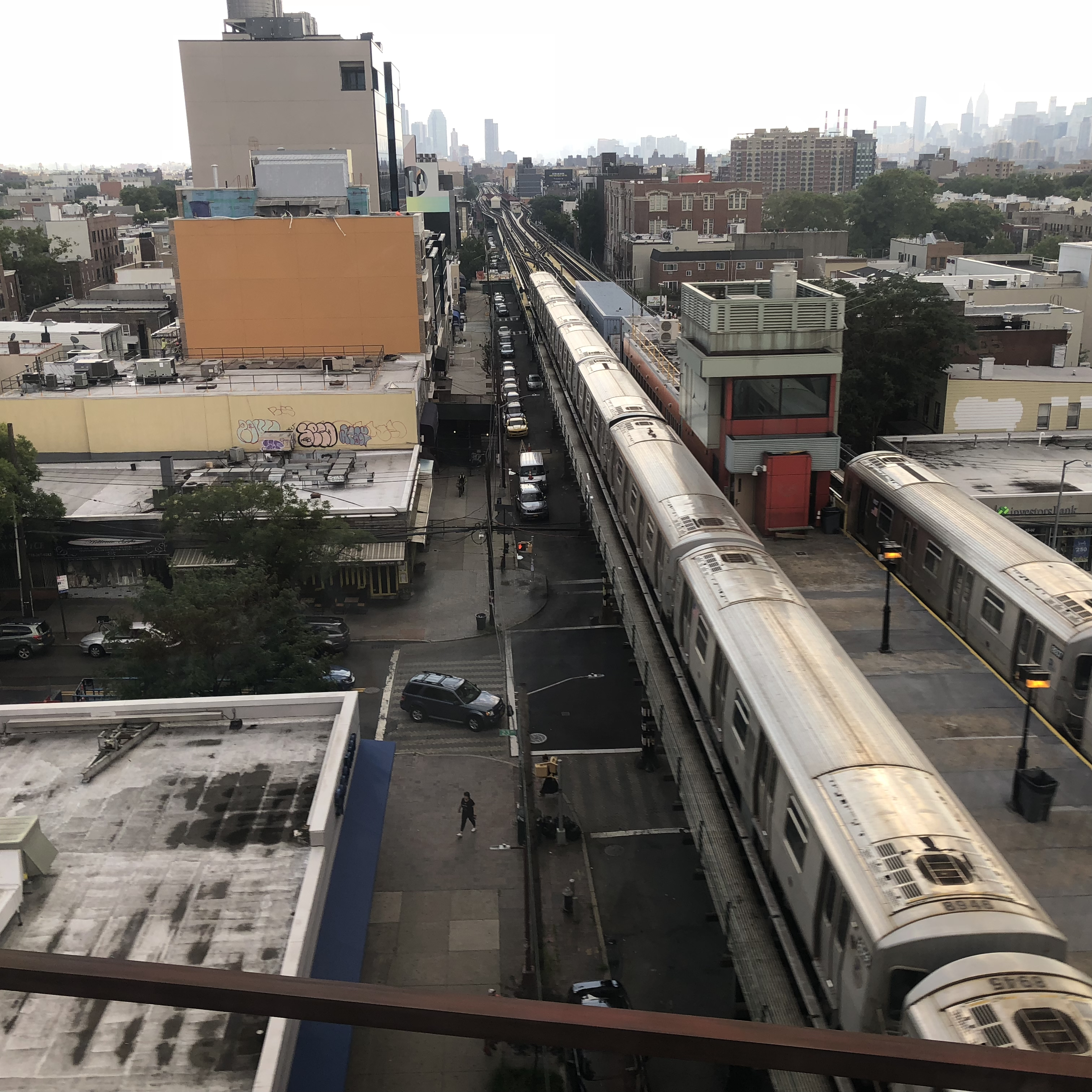
Astoria–Ditmars Boulevard station seen from the New York Connecting Railroad viaduct

This station opened on February 1, 1917, along with the rest of the Astoria Line, which was originally part of the IRT, as a spur off the IRT Queensboro Line, now the IRT Flushing Line. Trains ran between Grand Central and Astoria. Dignitaries from the first ride included President of Alderman Frank Dowling, Public Service Commissioner Hodges, numerous other officials of the commission, President Shonts of the IRT, with a number of his assistants, and Queens Borough President Connolly. Members of the PSC pointed out the need to extend the line from the terminal to Ditmars Boulevard and Steinway Street. Regular passenger service started that afternoon. The station's name was originally Ditmars Avenue, which was the name of Ditmars Boulevard at the station's opening.

On July 23, 1917, the Queensboro Bridge spur of the elevated IRT Second Avenue Line opened. At that time, all elevated trains to Queensboro Plaza used the Astoria Line while all subway trains used the Corona Line, though this was later changed with trains alternating between branches. This station started to be served by BMT shuttles using elevated cars on April 8, 1923.

The city government took over the BMT's operations on June 1, 1940, and the IRT's operations on June 12, 1940. On October 17, 1949, the Astoria Line became BMT-only as the tracks at Queensboro Plaza were consolidated and the platforms on the Astoria Line were shaved back to allow through BMT trains to operate on it. Service was initially provided by the Brighton Local (BMT 1) weekdays & Broadway - Fourth Avenue Local (BMT 2) at all times.

=== Renovations ===
In 1981, the MTA listed the station among the 69 most deteriorated stations in the subway system. The MTA received a $106 million grant from the Urban Mass Transit Administration in October 1983; most of the grant would fund the renovation of eleven stations, including Ditmars Boulevard.

In February 2018, the MTA announced that the station would be renovated for 14 months beginning in April of that year, as part of a $22 million project. The station house, mezzanine, and stairs would be repaired. Some residents protested, arguing that the renovated station would lack elevators, and that then-ongoing full closures of the 30th Avenue and 36th Avenue stations in Astoria had negatively impacted the community. The station remained open during renovation.

== Station layout ==
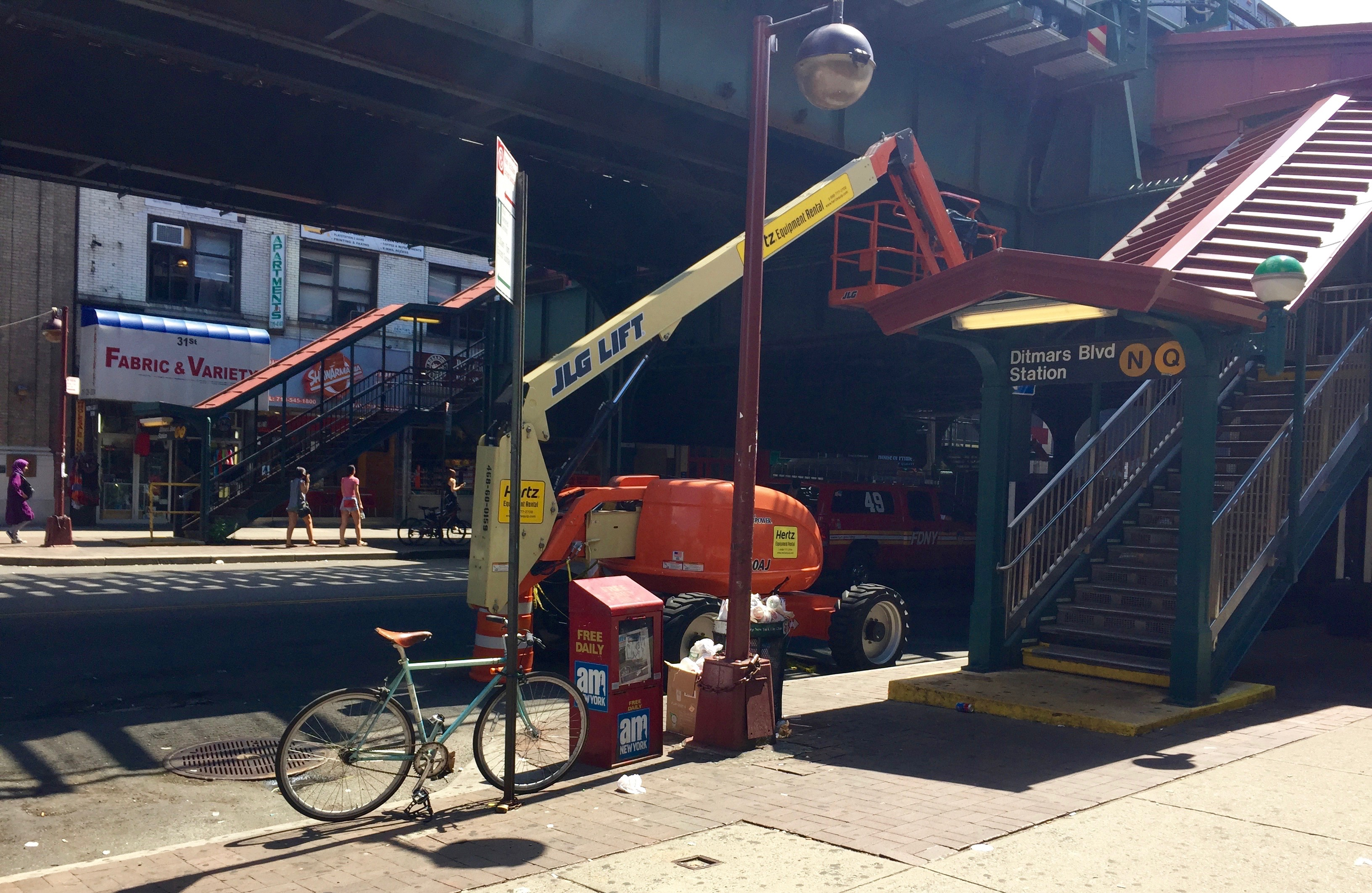
Staircase entrances on 31st Street. The Q train served this station from 2010 to 2016.

The Astoria–Ditmars Boulevard station has two tracks and an island platform. The N stops here at all times and the W stops only on weekdays during the day; the station is the northern terminus for both trains. The next stop to the south is Astoria Boulevard. It is partially located under the New York Connecting Railroad (NYCR) viaduct. Most of the platform is north of the viaduct. The platform canopy extends to the portion of the platform under the NYCR. The tracks end at bumper blocks at the north end of the platform.

As part of the MTA Arts & Design program, Elisabeth Condon created an artwork for the station, titled Urban Idyll, which was installed in 2018. It consists of laminated glass windows with a Tree of Life theme.

=== Exits ===
The station's only mezzanine is a station house beneath the tracks and platforms. Two double-wide staircases from the platform go down to their own bank of turnstiles with a token booth in the middle. Outside fare control, there are four staircases, two going down to the west side of 31st Street between Ditmars Boulevard and 23rd Avenue and two going down to the east side. The east side of the station house has a short, enclosed pedestrian bridge that leads to the Ditmars Plaza Mini Mall, located on the second floor of the adjacent Garry Building. This mall has a staircase to the street, providing another entrance to the station.

== Provisions for proposed extensions ==
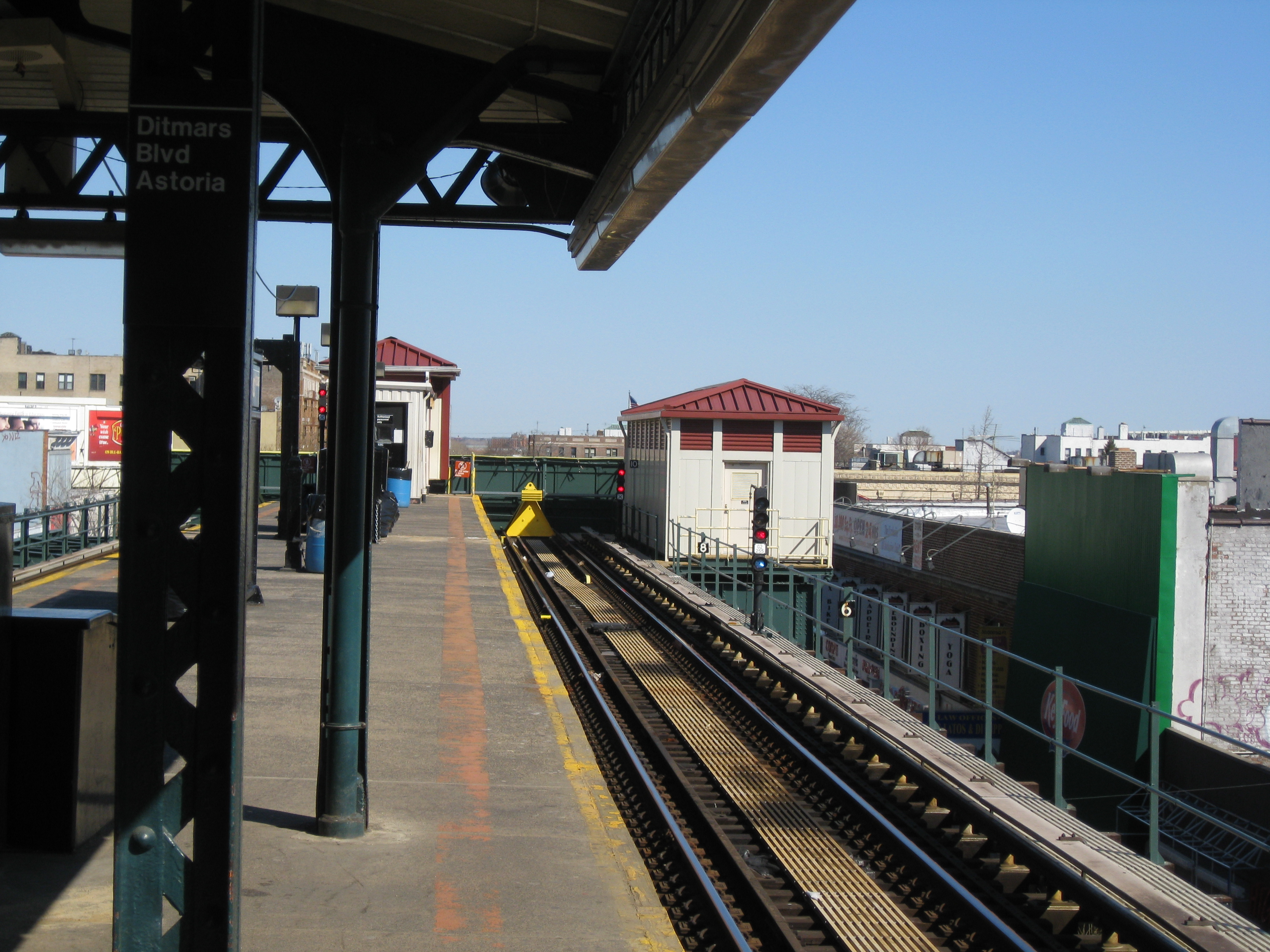
End of the station.

There was a proposed, but never-built, extension of the line toward Bayside and possibly LaGuardia Airport. In 1998, an extension of the BMT Astoria Line to LaGuardia Airport was planned as part of a $1.2 billion package to provide access to the New York City airports with funding from the MTA, the Port Authority and the city. The preferred route would have extended the Astoria Line along 31st Street north onto Con Edison’s property at the edge of Astoria and then east along 19th Avenue to the Marine Air Terminal. The MTA also considered an eastward extension along Ditmars Boulevard, and a plan to reroute LaGuardia-bound trains from Queensboro Plaza through the Sunnyside rail yard and along the eastern edge of St. Michael’s Cemetery to elevated tracks parallel to the Grand Central Parkway. A fourth route was to have trains turn east via Astoria Boulevard. All of the options would have new elevated sections built. $645 million for the LaGuardia extension was included in the MTA’s 2000-2004 Five-Year Capital Plan, and in late 2002, Mayor Bloomberg supported the extension. These options were studied in the LaGuardia Airport Subway Access Study. Community opposition was strong and therefore the plan was canceled in July 2003. After the AirTrain LaGuardia people mover, which would have run to Mets–Willets Point, was canceled in 2023, a panel of three transportation experts recommended that the Port Authority of New York and New Jersey operate a shuttle bus route from the airport to the Astoria–Ditmars Boulevard station.

The Regional Plan Association, in its Fourth Plan in 2017, anticipated that the population of Astoria would quickly grow over the next three decades, and so called for the Astoria Line to be extended to a new storage yard at Ditmars Boulevard and 20th Street, which would provide added capacity. In addition, a new station at 21st Avenue and 20th Street would improve access for the currently underserved but dense northwest parts of Astoria.

== Ridership ==
In 2019, the station had 5,277,341 boardings, making it the 120th most used station in the 423-station system. This amounted to an average of 17,912 passengers per weekday.

== Image gallery ==
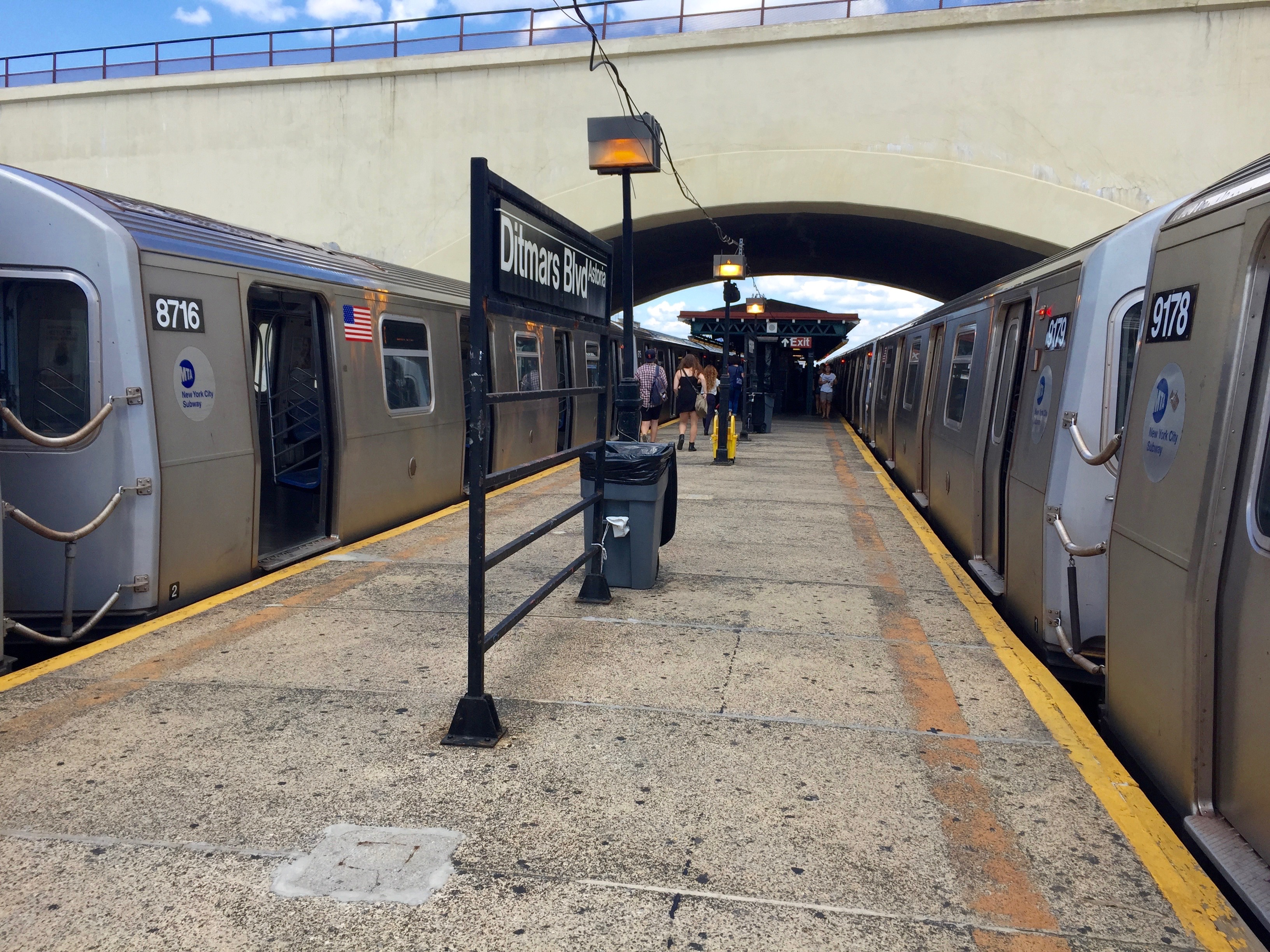
Platform before 2019 renovation

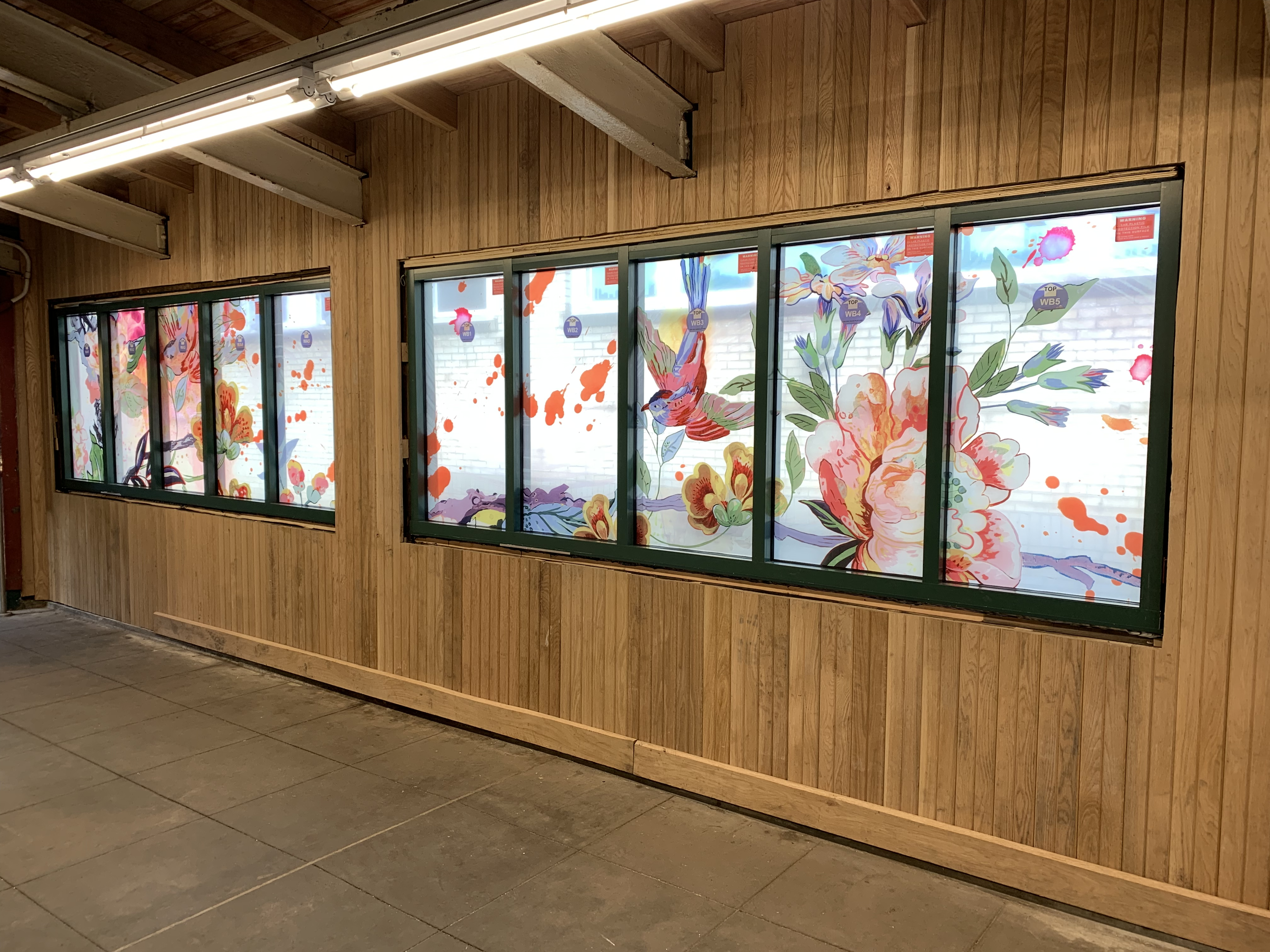
Elisabeth Condon's Urban Idyll piece in the station's mezzanine.

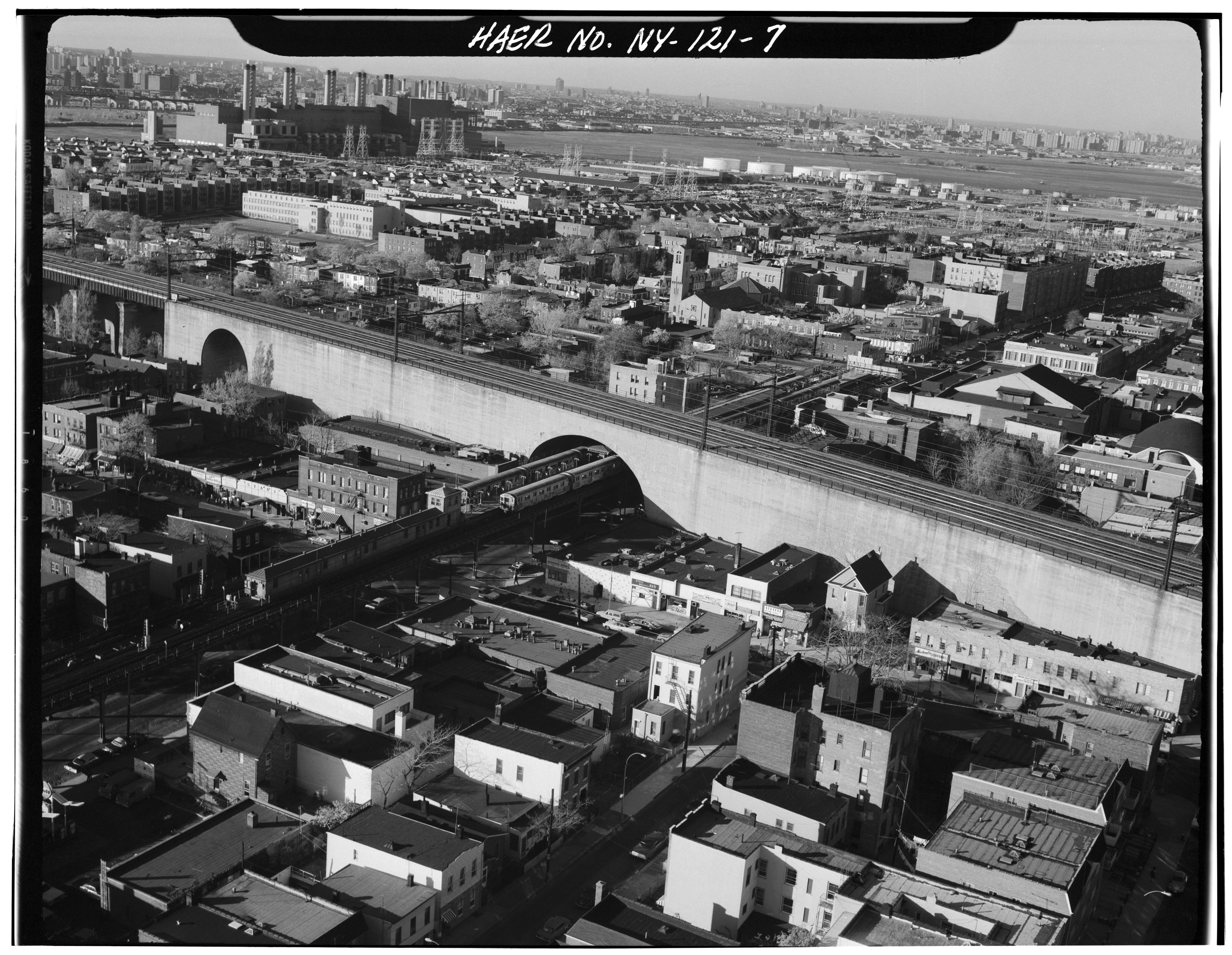
Station seen in 1970s

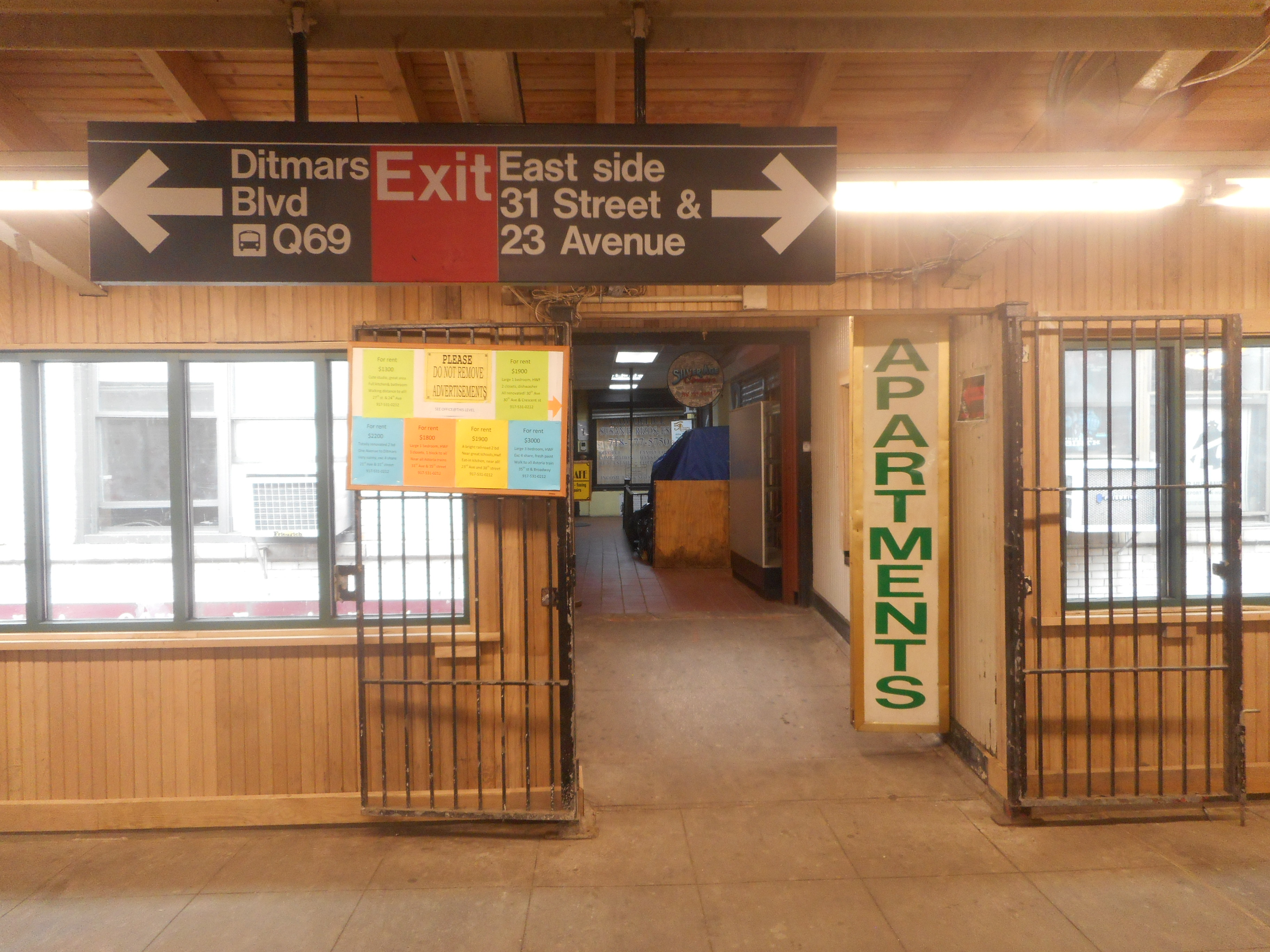
Gerry Building Entrance
