= Technology of the New York City Subway =

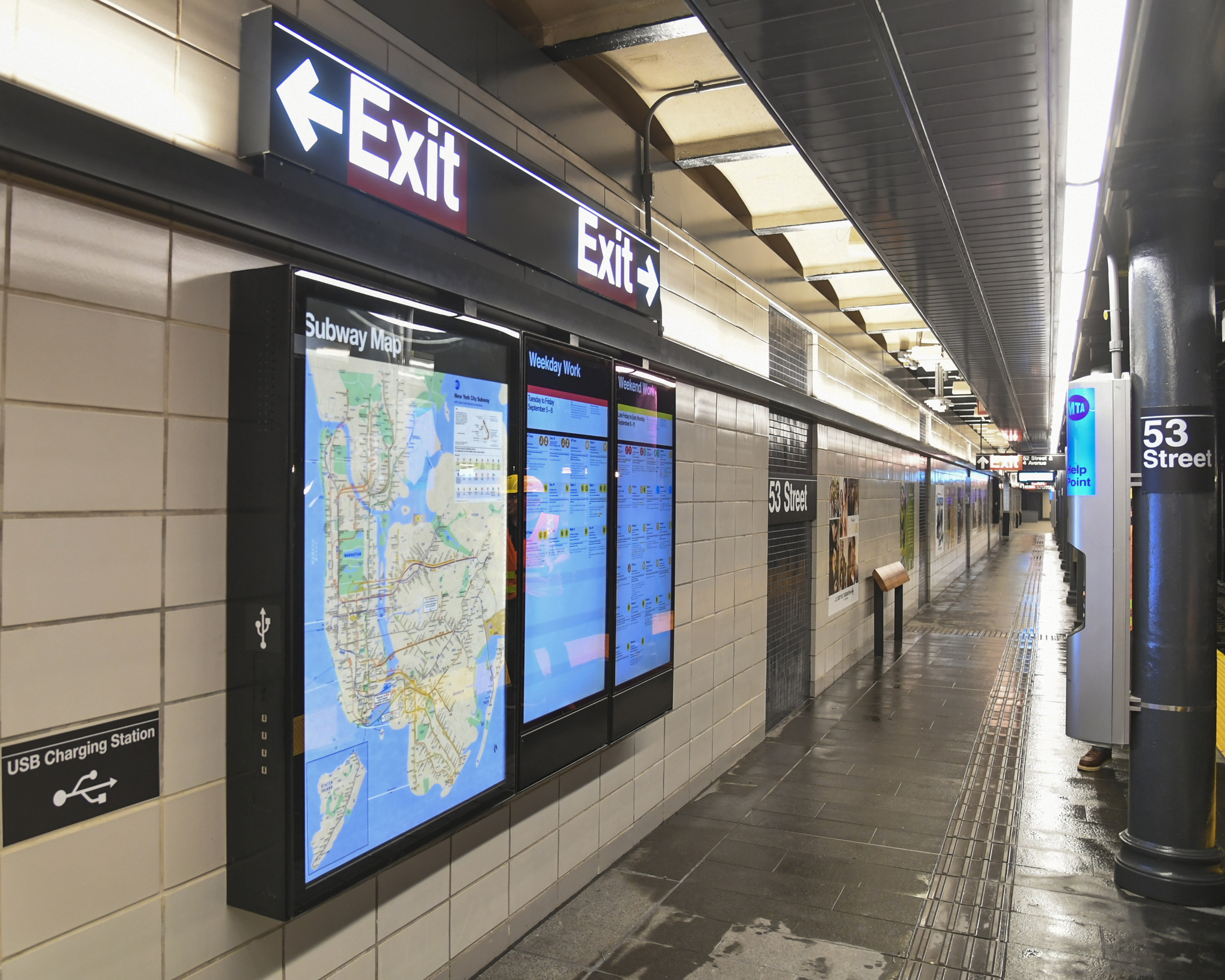
53rd Street, an "enhanced" subway station

Since the late 20th century, the Metropolitan Transportation Authority has started several projects to maintain and improve the New York City Subway. Some of these projects, such as subway line automation, proposed platform screen doors, the FASTRACK maintenance program, and infrastructural improvements proposed in 2015–2019 Capital Program, contribute toward improving the system's efficiency. Others, such as train-arrival "countdown clocks", "Help Point" station intercoms, "On the Go! Travel Station" passenger kiosks, wireless and cellular network connections in stations, MetroCard fare payment alternatives, and digital ads, are meant to benefit individual passengers. Yet others, including the various methods of subway construction, do not directly impact the passenger interface, but are used to make subway operations efficient.

In the mid-1990s, it started converting the BMT Canarsie Line to use communications-based train control, using a moving block signal system that allowed more trains to use the tracks and thus increasing passenger capacity. After the Canarsie Line tests were successful, the MTA expanded the automation program in the 2000s and 2010s to include other lines. This led to a 2017 proposal to install platform screen doors in one Canarsie Line station. Additionally, as part of another program called FASTRACK, the MTA started closing certain lines during weekday nights in 2012, with each of the lines closing overnight for a week in order to allow workers to clean these lines without being hindered by train movements. The program was expanded beyond Manhattan the next year after observing the increased efficiency of the FASTRACK program compared to previous service diversions. In 2015, the MTA announced a wide-ranging improvement program as part of the 2015–2019 Capital Program. Thirty stations would be extensively rebuilt under the Enhanced Station Initiative, and new R211 subway cars would be able to fit more passengers.

The MTA has also started some projects to improve passenger amenities. It added train arrival "countdown clocks" to most A Division (numbered route) stations and the BMT Canarsie Line (L train) by late 2011, allowing passengers on these routes to see train arrival times using real-time data. A similar countdown-clock project for the B Division (lettered routes) and the IRT Flushing Line was deferred until 2016, when a new Bluetooth-based clock system was tested successfully. Beginning in 2011, the MTA installed "Help Point" to aid with emergency calls or station agent assistance, in all stations. Interactive touchscreen kiosks, which give station advisories, itineraries, and timetables, were installed starting in 2011. Cellular phone and wireless data in stations, first installed in 2011 as part of a pilot program, was expanded systemwide due to positive passenger feedback. Additionally, credit-card trials at several subway stations in 2006 and 2010 led to proposals for OMNY, a contactless payment system to replace the aging MetroCard system used to pay fares on MTA-operated transportation. Finally, in 2017, the MTA started installing digital advertisements in trains and stations.

== Construction methods ==
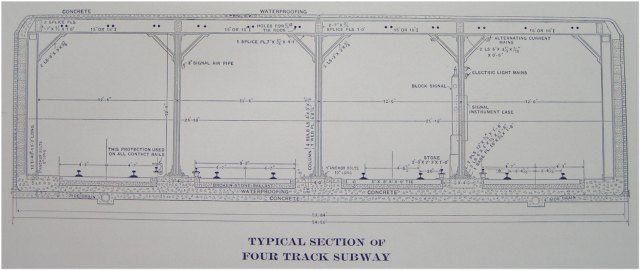
Cross-section of the first subway

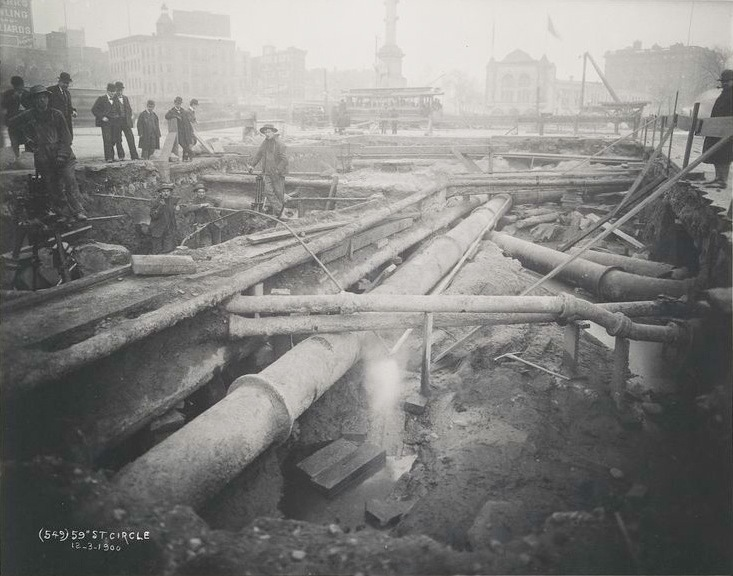
For the first IRT subway line, pictured at 59th Street – Columbus Circle, cut-and-cover was used as a form of construction.

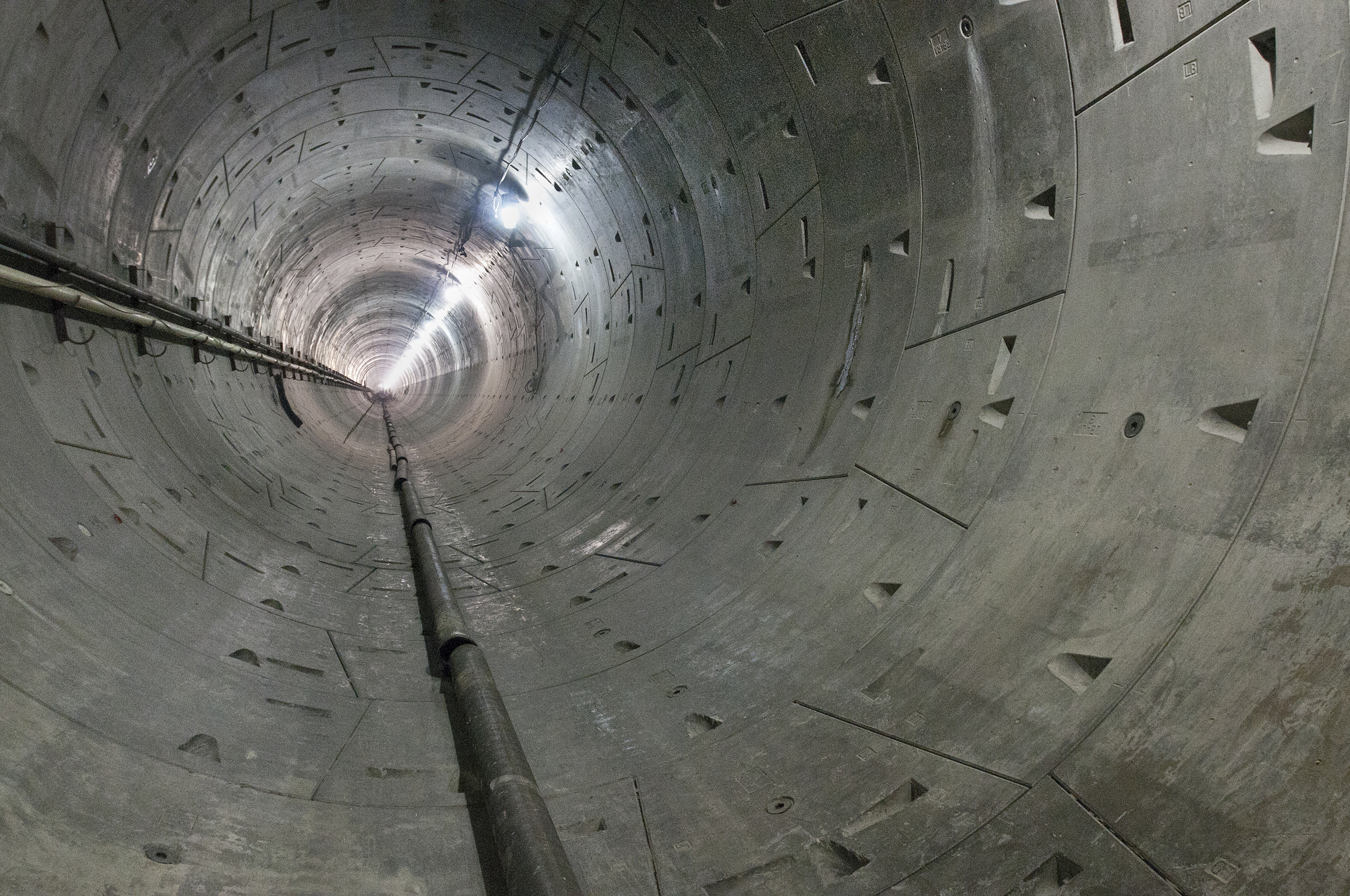
Recent projects, like the extension of the IRT Flushing Line (pictured) use tunnel boring machines to build the subway tunnels.

When the IRT subway debuted in 1904, the typical tunnel construction method was cut-and-cover. The street was torn up to dig the tunnel below before being rebuilt from above. Traffic on the street above would be interrupted due to the digging up of the street. Temporary steel and wooden bridges carried surface traffic above the construction. The 7,700 workers who built the original subway lines were mostly immigrants living in Manhattan.

Contractors in this type of construction faced many obstacles, both natural and man-made. They had to deal with rock formations, and ground water, which required pumps. 12 miles (19 km) of sewers, as well as water and gas mains, electric conduits, and New York City steam system pipes had to be rerouted. Street railways had to be torn up to allow the work. The foundations of tall buildings often ran near the subway construction, and in some cases needed underpinning to ensure stability.

This method worked well for digging soft dirt and gravel near the street surface. However, tunnelling shields were required for deeper sections, such as the Harlem and East River tunnels, which used cast-iron tubes. Segments between 33rd and 42nd streets under Park Avenue, 116th Street and 120th Street under Broadway, and 145th Street and Dyckman Street (Fort George) under Broadway and Saint Nicholas Avenue as well as the tunnel from 96th Street to Central Park North–110th Street & Lenox Avenue, used either rock or concrete-lined tunnels.

About 40% of the subway system runs on surface or elevated tracks, including steel or cast iron elevated structures, concrete viaducts, embankments, open cuts and surface routes. All of these construction methods are completely grade-separated from road and pedestrian crossings, and most crossings of two subway tracks are grade-separated with flying junctions. The sole level junctions of two lines in regular revenue service are the 142nd Street junction and the Myrtle Avenue junction.

More recent projects use tunnel boring machines, which minimize disruption at street level and avoid already existing utilities, but increase cost. Examples of such projects include the extension of the IRT Flushing Line and the IND Second Avenue Line.

== Automation and signaling ==
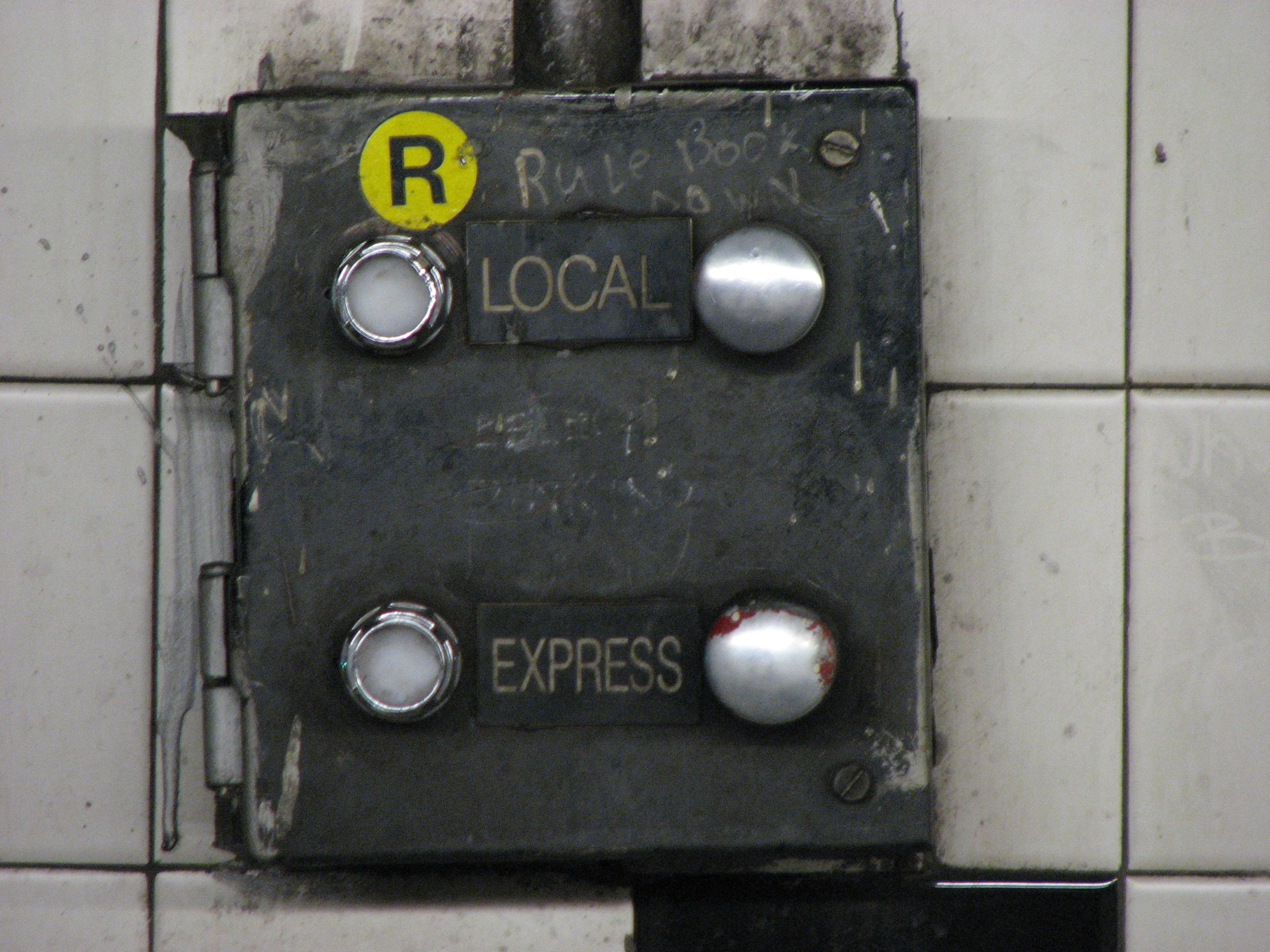
This is a punch box, used for signaling to a tower operator which line the train should use at a junction. This technology is no longer in use on the IRT (A Division); the signal system that allows countdown clocks also automates train identification and switching.

The MTA has plans to upgrade much of New York City Subway system from a fixed block signaling system to one with communications-based train control (CBTC) technology, which will control the speed and starting and stopping of subway trains. The CBTC system is mostly automated and uses a moving block system – which reduces headways between trains, increases train frequencies and capacities, and relays the trains' positions to a control room – rather than a fixed block system. This will require new rolling stock to be built for the subway system, as only newer trains can use CBTC systems.

Trains using CBTC locate themselves based on measuring their distance past fixed transponders installed between the rails. Trains equipped with CBTC have a transponder interrogator antenna beneath each carriage, which communicates with the fixed trackside transponders and report the trains' location to a wayside Zone Controller via radio. Then, the Controller issues Movement Authorities to the trains. This technology upgrade will allow trains to be operated at closer distances, slightly increasing capacity; will allow the MTA to keep track of trains in real time and provide more information to the public regarding train arrivals and delays; and will obviate the need for complex interlocking towers. The trains are also equipped with high-tech computers inside the cab so that the conductor could monitor the train's speed and relative location.

=== First two lines ===
The BMT Canarsie Line (L service) was the first line to implement the automated technology using Siemens's Trainguard MT CBTC system, as it was a self-contained line with none of the route interlining seen elsewhere around the system. The CBTC project was first proposed in 1994 and approved by the MTA in 1997. Installation of the signal system was begun in 2000. Initial testing began in 2004, and installation was mostly completed by December 2006, with all CBTC-equipped R143 subway cars in service by that date. Due to an unexpected ridership increase on the Canarsie Line, the MTA ordered more R160 cars and these were put into service in 2010. This enabled the agency to operate up to 26 trains per hour up from the May 2007 service level of 15 trains per hour, an achievement that would not be possible without the CBTC technology or a redesign of the previous automatic block signal system. The R143s and R160s both use Trainguard MT CBTC, supplied by Siemens.

The next line to have CBTC installed was the pre-existing IRT Flushing Line and its western extension opened in 2015 (served by the 7 and <7> trains). The Flushing Line was chosen for the second implementation of CBTC because it is also a self-contained line with no direct connections to other subway lines currently in use. The 2010–2014 capital budget provided funding for CBTC installation on the Flushing Line, with scheduled installation originally set for completion in 2016. The R188 cars were ordered in 2010 to equip the line with compatible rolling stock. This order consists of new cars and retrofits of existing R142A cars for CBTC. However, the CBTC retrofit date was later pushed back to 2017 or 2018. The installation is being done by Thales Group.

=== Expansion ===
Siemens and Thales successfully conducted tests on one of the IND Culver Line's tracks to determine if their CBTC systems were compatible, thus allowing installation of CBTC on the rest of the B Division. In 2016, Siemens and Thales were awarded a contract to install CBTC on the IND Queens Boulevard Line from 50th Street/8th Avenue and 47th–50th Streets–Rockefeller Center to Kew Gardens–Union Turnpike. Planning for phase one started in 2015 and was complete by February 2016, with major engineering work following in November 2016. Funding for CBTC on the IND Eighth Avenue Line from 59th Street–Columbus Circle to High Street is also provided in the 2015–2019 Capital Program, along with the modernization of interlockings at 30th and 42nd Streets. The local tracks of the IND Culver Line would also get CBTC as part of the 2015–2019 Capital Program, as well as the entire line between Church Avenue and West Eighth Street–New York Aquarium, with three interlockings to be upgraded on that stretch.

As of 2014, MTA projects that 355 miles (571 km) of track will receive CBTC signals by 2029, including most of the IND, as well as the IRT Lexington Avenue Line and the BMT Broadway Line. The MTA also is planning to install CBTC equipment on the IND Crosstown Line, the BMT Fourth Avenue Line and the BMT Brighton Line before 2025.

Additionally, the New York City Subway uses a system known as Automatic Train Supervision (ATS) for dispatching and train routing on the A Division (the Flushing line, and the trains used on the 7 and <7> services, do not have ATS.) ATS allows dispatchers in the Operations Control Center (OCC) to see where trains are in real time, and whether each individual train is running early or late. Dispatchers can hold trains for connections, re-route trains, or short-turn trains to provide better service when a disruption causes delays.

=== Other ideas ===
In 2017, the MTA started testing ultra-wideband radio-enabled train signaling on the IND Culver Line. The ultra-wideband train signals would be able to carry more data wirelessly in a manner similar to CBTC, but can be installed faster. The ultra-wideband signals would have the added benefit of allowing passengers to use cellphones while between stations, instead of the current setup (see Technology of the New York City Subway § Cellular phone and wireless data) that only provides cellphone signals within the stations.

== Platform screen doors ==
The MTA has long been reluctant to install platform screen doors in the subway system, though it had been considering such an idea since the 1980s. Originally, it was planned to install platform doors in several stations along the Second Avenue Subway and on the 7 Subway Extension, but their installation presented substantial technical challenges, as there are different placements of doors on New York City Subway rolling stock. The platform-door proposal was scrapped in 2012 because of high installation and maintenance costs, rolling stock door placement, the need to provide a suitable signal interface between the train and platform, and the potential delay in operations that would result from the operation of such doors.

The MTA is also interested in retrofitting platform screen doors on the Canarsie Line, along the L train, and the IRT Flushing Line, along the 7 and <7> trains. However, it is unlikely that the entire New York City Subway system will get retrofitted with platform screen doors or automatic platform gates due to, again, the varying placements of doors on rolling stock. Following a series of incidents during one week in November 2016, in which 3 people were injured or killed after being pushed into tracks, the MTA started to consider installing platform edge doors for the 42nd Street Shuttle. By 2017, a pilot program for platform screen door technology was underway at the Pelham Parkway station in the Bronx.

The MTA conducted an internal study of the system in 2019 to determine whether platform screen doors could be installed at each station. The MTA concluded that only 128 stations, or 27 percent of the network, could theoretically be fitted with platform screen doors. Between those, only 41 such stations would theoretically be able to receive such doors in 2019 due to mismatches in door positions between different rolling stock, (Note: The A Division uniformly uses 51-foot-long (16 m) cars with three doors on each side. As of 2019, the B Division uses 60-foot-long (18 m) and 75-foot-long (23 m) cars with four doors on each side.) and it would take ten years to have a uniform door position among all rolling stock. Of the infeasible stations, 154 stops could not receive platform doors because the resulting platform would be too narrow under the ADA, while 100 stops (mostly above ground) had precast concrete platforms that would not be able to support the weight of the doors. The MTA claimed the remaining stations could not be refitted because of persistent fleet alignment issues; (Note: 60-foot-long B Division cars have slightly different door arrangements based on whether they are "A" (cab) cars or "B" (trailer) cars, and they are arranged in four- or five-car sets. Four-car sets have two "A" cars and two "B" cars, and five-car sets have two "A" cars and three "B" cars. The MTA concluded that 31 stations could not be retrofitted with PSDs, regardless of whether all B Division cars were standardized to 60 feet long, because these stations are served by trains that use both four-car and five-car sets.) columns that were too close to the platform edge, an inaccessible platform, insufficient space for a platform-door equipment room, and, in one case (14th Street-Union Square on the Lexington Avenue Line), gap fillers.

=== Platform door pilots ===
In October 2017, it was announced that as part of a pilot program, the Canarsie Line's Third Avenue station was planned to be refitted with platform screen doors while the 14th Street Tunnel was rebuilt from April 2019 to March 2020. This was possible as a result of the L train's automated train operation. The MTA would have used the results of the pilot in order to determine the feasibility of adding such doors citywide. The PSDs would have been approximately 54 in (140 cm) high and would have been coordinated with the location of the subway car doors when a train was in the station. To ensure that the subway cars were precisely lined up with the doors, a wayside-only berthing system would be installed. Emergency egress gates would be installed in between the regular doors to allow people to exit in the case of an emergency. The platform edges and topping would be removed and replaced so that they align with the sills of the train doors and to be in compliance with the Americans with Disabilities Act of 1990. To ensure that people do not get trapped in between the subway car doors and the PSDs, sensors and CCTV cameras would be installed with monitors at the center and front of the platforms visible to the train operator and conductor. In June 2018, the $30 million for the platform edge door pilot program was diverted to another project, and the pilot program was postponed until sufficient funding could be found. Stations constructed as part of the Second Avenue Subway's Phase 2 may receive platform screen doors depending on the results of studies being conducted for their installation elsewhere.

The MTA announced another PSD pilot program at three stations in February 2022: the 7 and <7> trains' platform at Times Square, the E train's platform at Sutphin Boulevard–Archer Avenue–JFK Airport, and the Third Avenue station. The announcement came after several people had been shoved onto tracks, including one incident that led to the death of Michelle Go at the Times Square stations.

On July 13, 2022, the MTA released a request for proposals for a design-build contract to install PSDs at the three pilot stations. To ensure the maintenance of the PSDs, there will be a separate long-term maintenance contract. The platforms at the stations will be rebuilt to support the weight of the PSDs, including the replacement of concrete and rubbing boards, the repositioning of tactile tiles, and steel reinforcement. Wayside-only berthing systems will be installed, with stopping locations at Times Square and Third Avenue being synchronized with the existing CBTC signal system. At these two stations, existing track will be replaced. To ensure riders can exit trains in the case of an emergency, emergency exit doors with push bars will be installed in the three stations, and to prevent riders from being trapped between the PSDs and train doors, door entrapment sensors will be installed. A PSD storage room and a PSD control room will be constructed in each station. The doors are planned to be installed starting in December 2023 at a cost of $6 million. Designs for the platform doors were being finalized by June 2023.

=== Platform fences and track intrusion detection ===
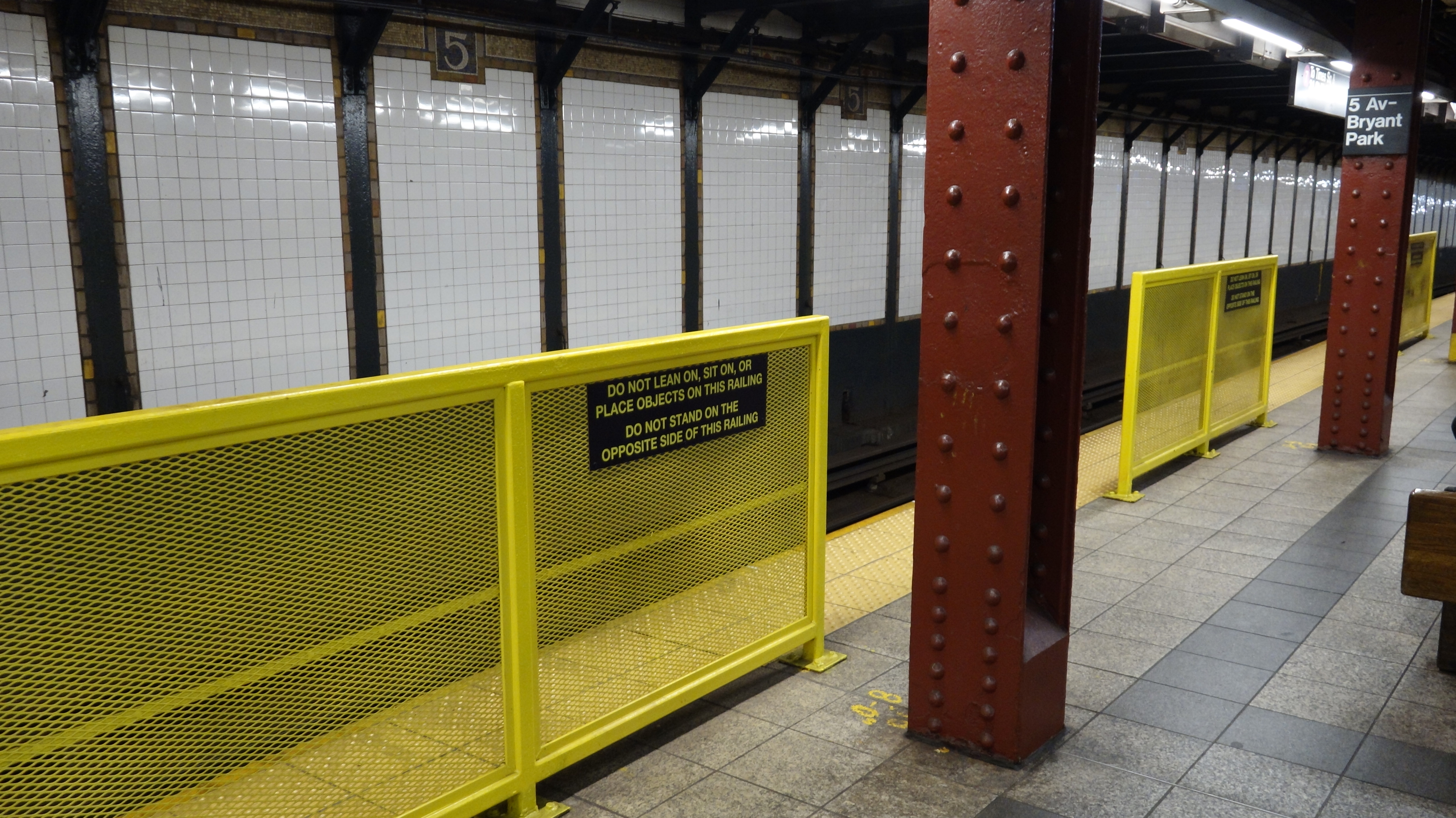
Non-movable low barriers at 5th Avenue

In 2023, short barriers were installed at the centers of the platforms at 57th Street, Bedford Avenue, and Crescent Street to reduce the probability of passengers being pushed into the tracks. In 2024, the MTA announced that it would install low platform fences at four stations (including 191st Street and Clark Street) to reduce the likelihood of passengers falling onto the tracks. Platform fences had been installed at 56 stations by July 2025 and 115 stations by that December.

The barriers consist of low fences, spaced along the length of the platform; there are no sliding platform screen doors between the barriers. The original fences are yellow rectangular barriers, but fences installed later in 2024 are painted gray; fences installed from 2025 onward have metal mesh paneling and a handrail that flares inward at the top. The fences are manufactured in-house by MTA's metalworking shops and weigh between 100 and 350 pounds (45 and 159 kg) each.

The MTA piloted a series of "track intrusion" sensors, including lasers and thermal sensors, to detect people and objects on the tracks in 2014. MTA officials solicited further ideas for track intrusion detection in 2022, and it proposed installing artificial intelligence-equipped cameras for this purpose in 2026.

== Air conditioning in stations ==
All subway trains have been air-conditioned since 1993, but most stations do not have any form of air conditioning. Seven of the New York City Subway's 472 stations contain artificial air-conditioning systems. The air-cooling systems are mostly located in subway stations that were built in the 21st century. In August 2006, the MTA revealed that all new subway stations would be outfitted with air-cooling systems to reduce the temperature along platforms by as much as 10 °F (6 °C). The stations with artificial cooling systems are the Grand Central–42nd Street station on the 4, 5, 6, and <6> trains, the Cortlandt Street and South Ferry stations on the 1 train, which both replaced older stations, the 34th Street–Hudson Yards station on the 7 and <7> trains, three stations on the Second Avenue Subway, the Lexington Avenue–63rd Street station, and the Cortlandt Street station on the N, R, and W trains. Fans are used at six additional stations.

The leader of MTA's construction department said in 2022 that it was not feasible to install air conditioning in most older stations. This is both because of the high power requirements for the air-cooling systems and because the presence of ventilation grates in older stations would reduce the efficiency of an air conditioning system. The Grand Central–42nd Street station is a major exception, since there is a large cooling plant for Grand Central Terminal immediately above the platforms that are air-conditioned; the plant was installed in 2000. According to The New York Times, it would cost $4.8 billion to install air-conditioning units in all other below-ground stations. In September 2023, the MTA began studying the feasibility of installing air conditioning in other stations. In 2025, as part of its attempts to protect the system against worsening global warming, the MTA began surveying the possibility of installing geothermal cooling systems in stations. The next year, the MTA began experimenting with a radiant cooling system, in which chilled water circulates through pipes to cool the surrounding air, at the East Broadway station.

== FASTRACK ==
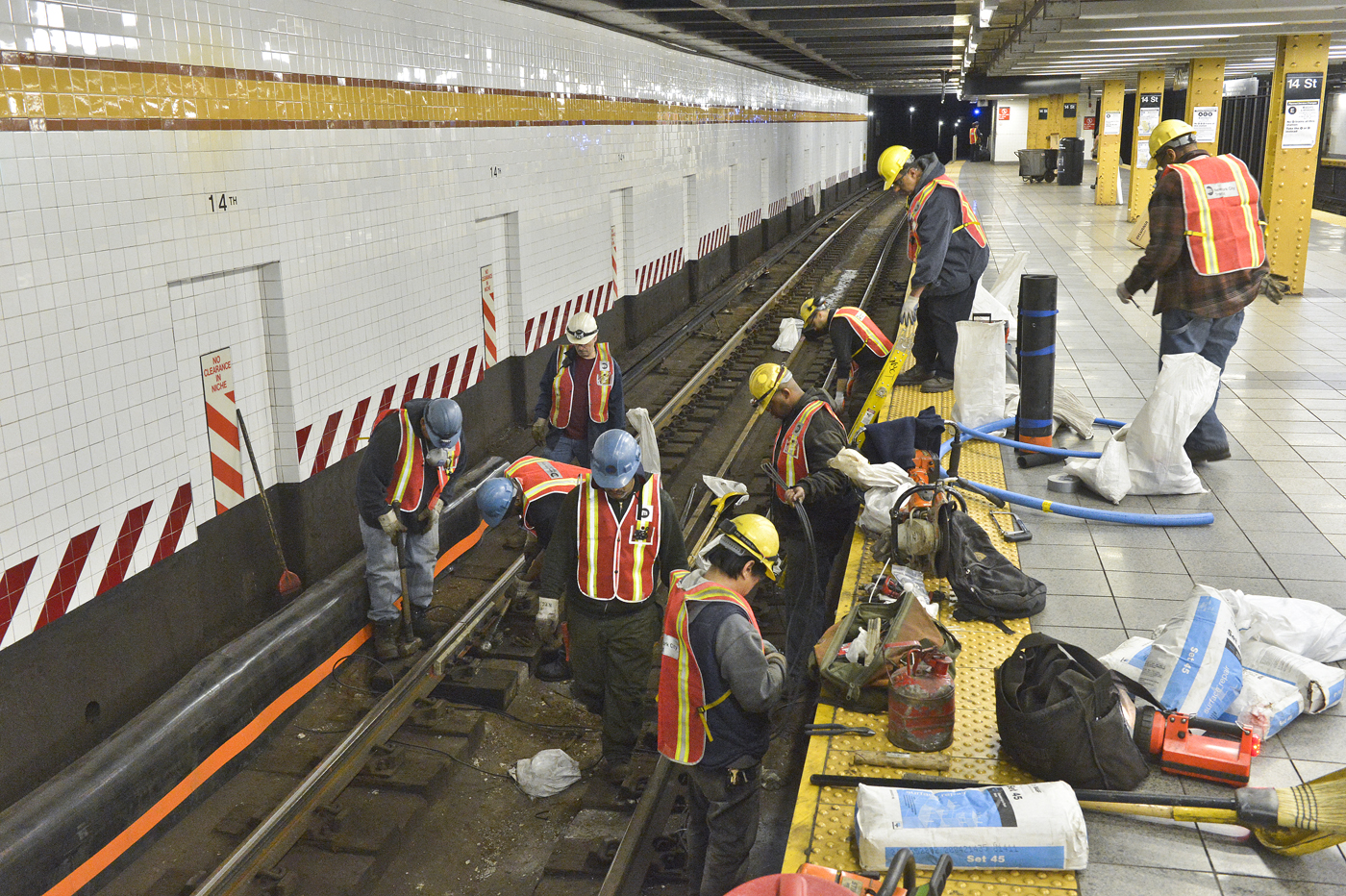
FASTRACK on the IND Eighth Avenue Line at 14th Street

In January 2012, the MTA introduced a new maintenance program, FASTRACK, to speed up repair work. This program involves a more drastic approach than previous construction, and completely shuts down a major portion of a line for overnight work on four consecutive weeknights from 10 p.m. to 6 a.m. According to the MTA, this new program proved much more efficient and quicker than regular service changes, especially because it happened at night and not the weekend, when most transit closures had occurred before. In 2012 the program only closed lines in Midtown and Lower Manhattan, (Note: The corridors repaired in 2012 were: IRT Lexington Avenue Line from Grand Central–42nd Street to Atlantic Avenue–Barclays Center; IND Sixth Avenue Line from 59th Street–Columbus Circle to West Fourth Street–Washington Square; IRT Broadway–Seventh Avenue Line from 34th Street–Penn Station to Atlantic Avenue–Barclays Center; IND Eighth Avenue Line from 59th Street–Columbus Circle to Jay Street–MetroTech) but due to the success of the program, the MTA decided to expand it to the outer boroughs as well. In 2013, FASTRACK was expanded to other corridors requiring minimal shuttle buses (Note: The corridors repaired in 2013 were: BMT Broadway Line from Queensboro Plaza to Court Street; IND Eighth Avenue Line from 168th Street to Inwood–207th Street; IND Concourse Line from 161st Street–Yankee Stadium to Norwood–205th Street; IND Queens Boulevard Line from Fifth Avenue/53rd Street to Jackson Heights–Roosevelt Avenue; IRT Nostrand Avenue Line from Franklin Avenue to Flatbush Avenue–Brooklyn College; IND Concourse/Eighth Avenue lines from 59th Street–Columbus Circle to 161st Street–Yankee Stadium and 168th Street, respectively; BMT Nassau Street Line from Broad Street to Essex Street; BMT Fourth Avenue Line from 36th Street to Bay Ridge–95th Street; IRT Lexington Avenue Line from Grand Central–42nd Street to 125th Street) and in 2014 to even more locations. There were corridors scheduled for 2014 during 24 weeks of the year, (Note: The corridors repaired in 2014 were: IRT Lexington Avenue Line from Grand Central–42nd Street to Atlantic Avenue–Barclays Center; IRT Lexington Avenue Line from Grand Central–42nd Street to 125th Street; IND Sixth Avenue Line from 59th Street–Columbus Circle to West Fourth Street–Washington Square; IND Sixth Avenue Line from West Fourth Street–Washington Square to Jay Street–MetroTech; IRT Broadway–Seventh Avenue Line from 34th Street–Penn Station to Atlantic Avenue–Barclays Center; IRT Broadway–Seventh Avenue Line from 96th Street to Dyckman Street; IRT Eastern Parkway Line from Atlantic Avenue–Barclays Center to Franklin Avenue; BMT Broadway Line from Queensboro Plaza to Court Street; IND Eighth Avenue Line from 59th Street–Columbus Circle to Jay Street–MetroTech; IND Eighth Avenue Line from 168th Street to Inwood–207th Street; IND Concourse/Eighth Avenue lines from 59th Street–Columbus Circle to 161st Street–Yankee Stadium and 168th Street, respectively; IND Concourse Line from 161st Street–Yankee Stadium to Norwood–205th Street; IND Queens Boulevard Line from Fifth Avenue/53rd Street to Jackson Heights–Roosevelt Avenue; BMT Fourth Avenue Line from 36th Street to Bay Ridge–95th Street; IND Fulton Street Line between Jay Street–MetroTech and Broadway Junction; IND Crosstown Line from Bedford–Nostrand Avenues to Hoyt–Schermerhorn Streets) 12 corridors scheduled during 22 weeks in 2015, and 13 corridors scheduled during 21 weeks in 2016.

As part of an $836 million program to resolve the subway's 2017–2021 state of emergency, MTA Chairman Joe Lhota announced the expansion of the FASTRACK program in order to fix critical infrastructure faster.

== 2015–2019 Capital Program overhaul ==
=== Enhanced Station Initiative ===
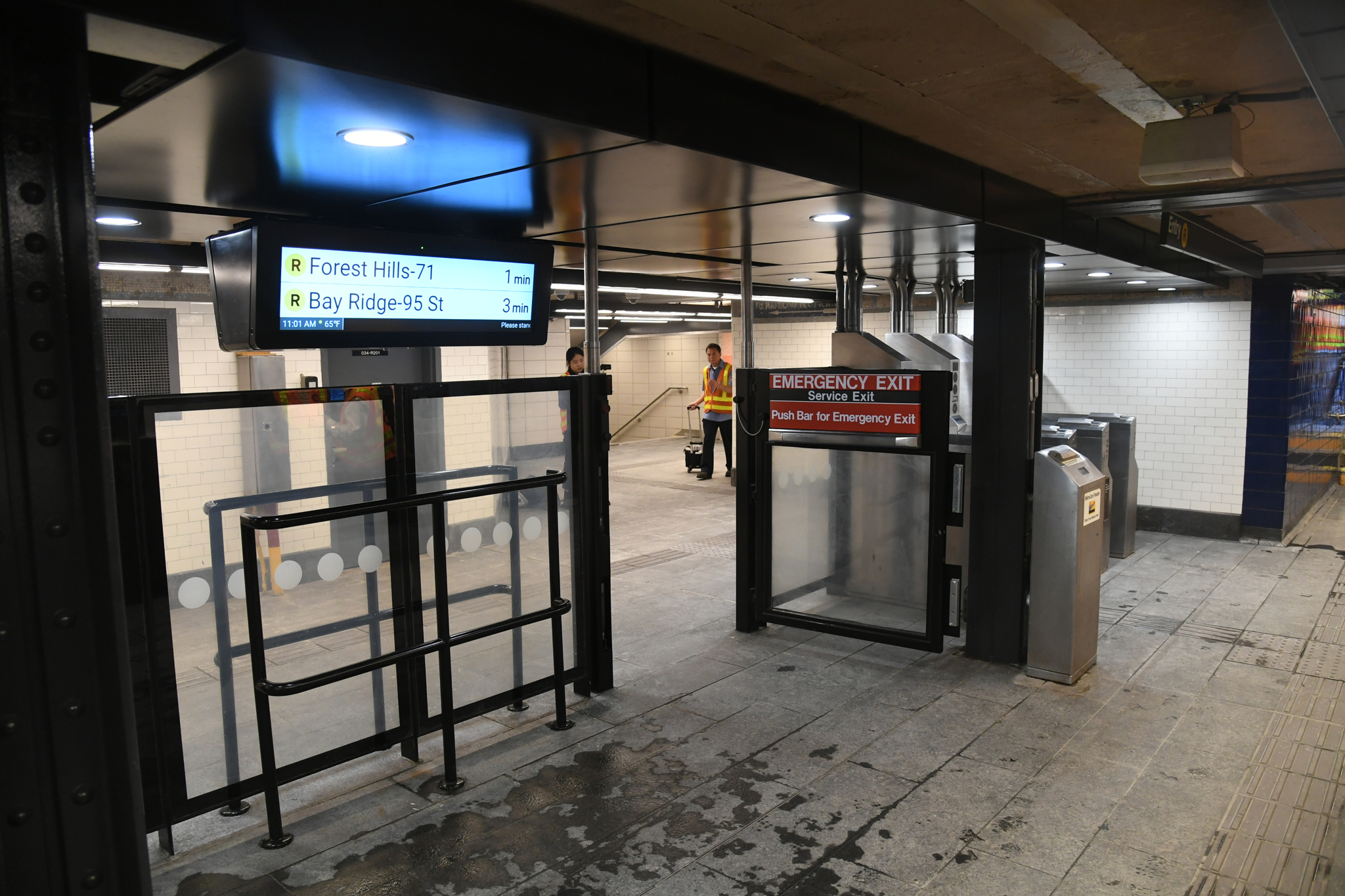
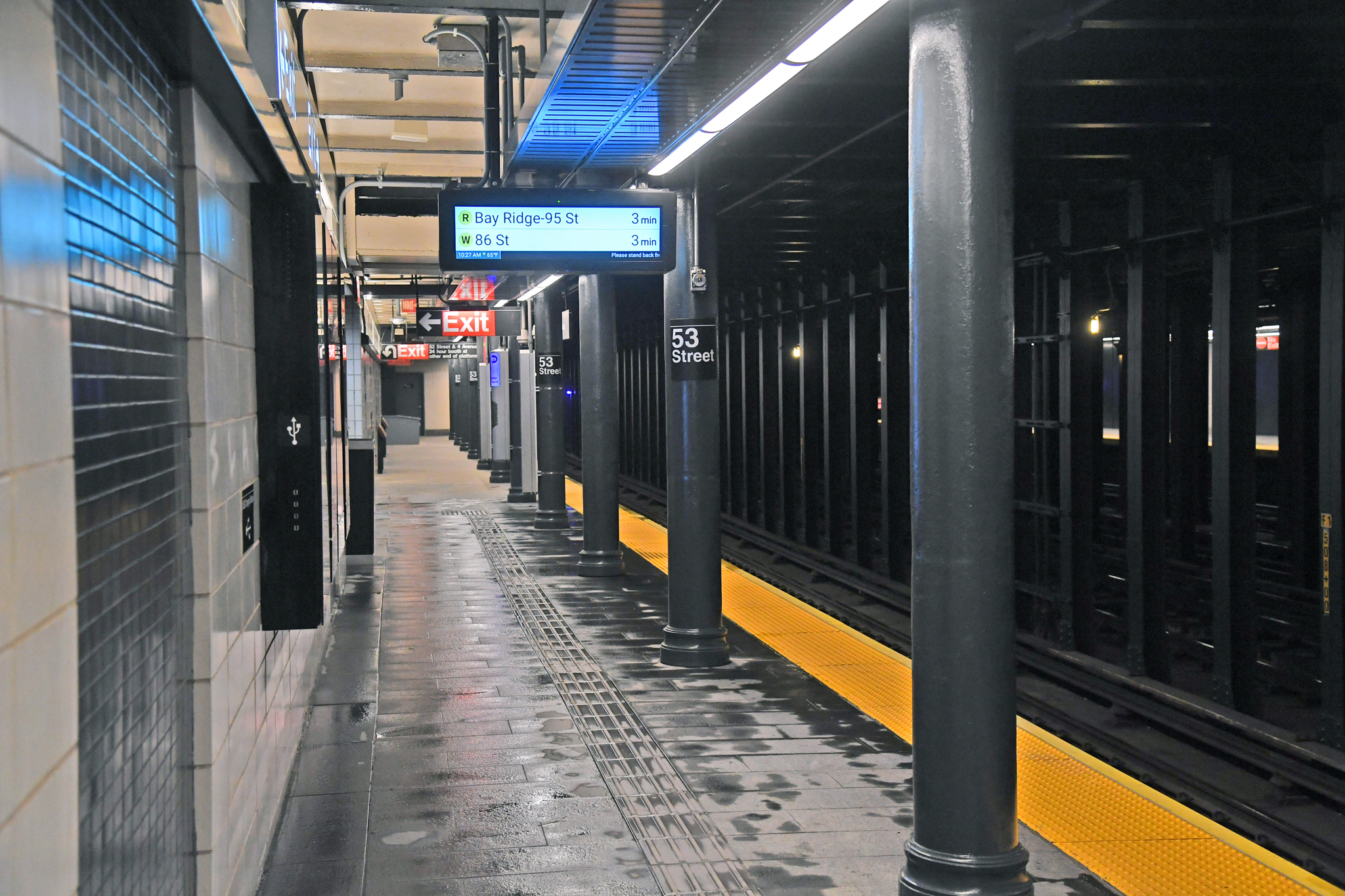
A sample fare control area (left) and platform level (right) of 53rd Street, a station rebuilt under the 2015–2019 modernization plan

The 2015–2019 MTA Capital Plan included funds for the Enhanced Station Initiative (ESI), under which thirty-three stations in all five boroughs would undergo a complete overhaul and would be entirely closed for up to 6 months at a time. The 34th Street–Penn Station stops on the IRT Broadway–Seventh Avenue Line and IND Eighth Avenue Line were added to the plan later, but would not be entirely closed due to their key location. The 30 original stations as part of the ESI would be rebuilt for $881 million, the two Penn Station stops would be rebuilt for $40 million, and the Richmond Valley stop on the Staten Island Railway would be rebuilt for $15 million. Five stations on the Metro-North Railroad were added to the plan in December 2017, as were sixteen stations on the Long Island Rail Road, which were proposed in several phases. (Note: Enhanced Station Initiative renovations are being performed at these stations: Phase 1: Deer Park, Brentwood, Merrick, Stony Brook, Syosset, East Hampton, Bellmore, and Farmingdale; Phase 2: Great Neck, Bayside, Northport, Valley Stream, Ronkonkoma, and Baldwin; Work would also be performed at Stewart Manor and Port Jefferson.)

Updates included cellular service, Wi-Fi, charging stations, interactive service advisories and maps, improved signage, strip maps for the subway routes, subway countdown clocks, service alerts, On-The-Go Informational Dashboards, neighborhood maps, new art, and improved station lighting. (Note: The Brooklyn stations are: Clinton–Washington Avenues, Kingston–Throop Avenues, and Van Siclen Avenue on the IND Fulton Street Line; Flushing Avenue and Classon Avenue on the IND Crosstown Line; Prospect Avenue, 53rd Street and Bay Ridge Avenue on the BMT Fourth Avenue Line; The Bronx stations are: 167th Street and 174th–175th Streets on the IND Concourse Line; Pelham Parkway on the IRT Dyre Avenue Line; Third Avenue–138th Street, Brook Avenue, East 149th Street, and Westchester Square–East Tremont Avenue on the IRT Flushing Line; The Manhattan stations are: 23rd Street and 57th Street on the IND Sixth Avenue Line; 28th Street on the IRT Lexington Avenue Line; 72nd Street, 86th Street, Cathedral Parkway–110th Street, and 163rd Street–Amsterdam Avenue on the IND Eighth Avenue Line; 145th Street on the IRT Lenox Avenue Line; The Queens stations are: Northern Boulevard, 67th Avenue, and Parsons Boulevard on the IND Queens Boulevard Line; 30th Avenue, Broadway, 36th Avenue, and 39th Avenue on the BMT Astoria Line; There is also one station on Staten Island that is part of the Staten Island Railway (SIR) that was renovated: the Richmond Valley.) Cables and conduits were decluttered, simplifying the stations' wiring. The stations also included glass barriers near fare control areas (rather than the metal fences that separate the paid and unpaid areas of the stations), as well as new tiled floors that are easy to clean. Concrete repairs, new platform edges, waterproofing, most tile patching, and structural steel repairs got the stations into states of good repair. Passenger amenities included next-train countdown clocks and neighborhood wayfinding maps at the exterior of each entrance; digital maps, MetroCard vending machines, and station agent booths situated in a central location in the mezzanine; and digital next-train information and service change notices at platform level. One additional station, Richmond Valley of the Staten Island Railway, was also overhauled, without being closed.

The renovations were done in several stages called "packages", which allowed contractors to renovate three to five stations in a given area simultaneously. The first four packages were completed in 23 months, by early 2019. The first package consisted of the Prospect Avenue, 53rd Street and Bay Ridge Avenue stations along the BMT Fourth Avenue Line in Brooklyn, for which the contract was awarded on November 30, 2016. From March to June 2017, these stations closed for construction, reopening from September to November 2017. The second group of stations, comprising the 30th Avenue, Broadway, 36th Avenue, and 39th Avenue stations on the BMT Astoria Line in Queens, was awarded on April 14, 2017, to Skanska USA, and entailed renovating these stations on a staggered schedule from October 2017 to February 2019. Originally, this package entailed renovating one platform at a time since the stations are all consecutive, unlike in other packages, but the plan was later amended so two sets of two non-consecutive stations would be completely closed at once.

The third package of stations was on the IND Eighth Avenue Line in Manhattan. The 163rd Street, 110th Street, 86th Street, and 72nd Street stations were included as part of an amendment to the Capital Program. The New York City Transit and Bus Committee officially recommended that the MTA Board award the $111 million contract for Package 3 to ECCO III Enterprises in October 2017. These stations were closed on a staggered schedule between March and June 2018, and reopened between September and November 2018. The fourth package of stations consisted of stations in midtown Manhattan, and included the 34th Street–Penn Station stops on the IND Eighth Avenue Line and the IRT Broadway–Seventh Avenue Line, 57th Street and 23rd Street on the IND Sixth Avenue Line, and 28th Street on the IRT Lexington Avenue Line. These stations, except the two 34th Street–Penn Station stops, were closed between July and December 2018. The fifth and final package for the New York City Subway included the remaining three stations in upper Manhattan and the southwest Bronx: 145th Street on the IRT Lenox Avenue Line, and 167th Street and 174th–175th Streets on the IND Concourse Line. It was originally the eighth of eight planned packages. The 145th Street station was closed between July and November 2018, while the Concourse Line stations was closed from August 2018 to December 2018. An additional package included the Metro-North Railroad stations at White Plains, Harlem–125th Street, Crestwood, Port Chester, and Riverdale.

The ESI program formerly contained thirteen more stations in three packages numbered 5 through 7, but these were deferred to the 2020–2024 Capital Program due to a lack of funding. The fifth package of stations would have been in northern and eastern Brooklyn, along with Richmond Valley of the SIR. This package would have included Flushing Avenue and Classon Avenue on the IND Crosstown Line, and Van Siclen Avenue, Kingston–Throop Avenues, and Clinton–Washington Avenues on the IND Fulton Street Line. The sixth package would have included stations in the eastern and northern Bronx, comprising Pelham Parkway on the IRT Dyre Avenue Line, as well as Third Avenue–138th Street, Brook Avenue, East 149th Street, and Westchester Square–East Tremont Avenue on the IRT Pelham Line. The seventh package would have included three stations on the IND Queens Boulevard Line: Northern Boulevard, 67th Avenue, and Parsons Boulevard.

In July 2017, after Package 1 had been assigned, the nonprofit Citizens Budget Commission released a study critical of the plan. In the study, the CBC noted that the 30 original stations only constituted 8% of weekday boardings, and none of these stations were in the list of 25 most-used stations in 2016. Compared to stations that would only be "renewed" under this Capital Plan, i.e. with less comprehensive improvements performed under partial closures, the average ESI station could be 2 to 2.5 times as expensive as the average non-ESI station. The CBC wrote that the MTA had added $857 million to the ESI's original $64 million in funding, and that the cost of extensive renovations offset the savings afforded by using design–build contracts for ESI projects. The ESI program has also been criticized for the full station closures that entails, which force riders to walk to the next station and add extra time to their commute. Some transit advocates have also pointed out that the Enhanced Station Initiative does not include improvements, such as elevators, that would make the stations compliant with the Americans with Disabilities Act of 1990.

In January 2018, the NYCT and Bus Committee recommended that Judlau Contracting receive the $125 million contract for Package 4 and that Citnalta-Forte receive the $125 million contract for Package 8. However, the MTA Board temporarily deferred the vote for these packages after city representatives refused to vote to award the contracts, citing the high cost and relatively low importance of the program. Some executives had pointed out that improving subway service was more important than renovating stations that were used by relatively few people. In response, MTA Chairman Joe Lhota said that these stations had been selected because ESI was a "pilot" program, and thus, the renovations would be tested on smaller stations first. NYCT Chairman Andy Byford looked over the list of ESI stations and concluded that the list was suitable because these stations were in need of structural improvements. He said that the MTA's decision to not add elevators was reasonable because the work involved would have delayed many of the projects for several years, and in some cases, other nearby stops already had or were getting elevators. The ESI packages were put back for a vote in February, and the two contracts were ultimately approved, with three city representatives dissenting.

In April 2018, Lhota announced that cost overruns had forced the MTA to reduce the number of subway stations included in the program from 33 stations to 19. The 19 subway stations still part of the program include those in Packages 1, 2, 3, 4, and 8, although the Staten Island Railway's Richmond Valley station from package 5 would still be included. Most of the $936 million allocated to the ESI was already used for the 19 stations underway. During the work, contractors had discovered additional infrastructure issues that had to be dealt with. In total, the work on the 19 subway stations will cost $850 million. The remaining $86 million will be used for subway accessibility projects. The 13 stations without funding will be pushed back to the 2020–2024 Capital Plan.

=== Other components ===
Minor component work, such as station signage, tiling, and lighting, would also be performed at over 170 other stations as part of the plan. The MTA would also begin designing OMNY, a new contactless fare payment system to replace the MetroCard (see § Contactless fare trials).

In addition, at least 1,025 R211 subway cars are expected to be ordered under the plan. The R211s would include 58-inch (150 cm) wide doors, wider than the current MTA standard of 50 inches (130 cm), thereby projected to reduce station dwell time by 32%. The new cars will have Wi-Fi installed (see § Cellular phone and wireless data), USB chargers, digital advertisements, digital customer information displays, illuminated door opening alerts, and security cameras, unlike the current New Technology Trains, which lack these features. Some lines, like the IND Eighth Avenue Line, would get communications-based train control as part of a larger plan to automate the system. These measures are all projected to help reduce overcrowding on the subway, which is prevalent.

== Train arrival countdown clocks ==
Different types of train arrival countdown clocks

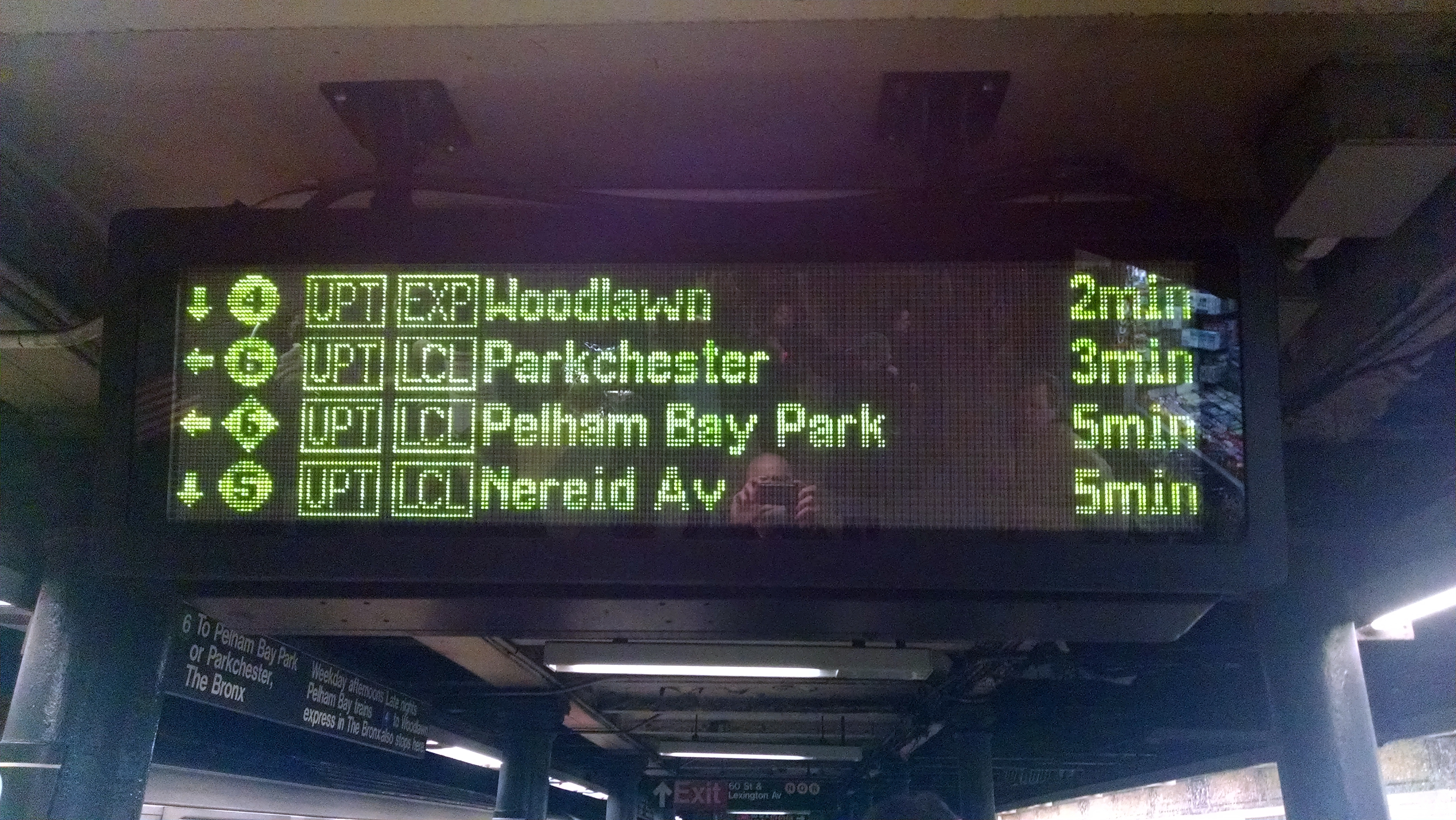
Detailed next-train signs of the type used on the A Division, at 59th Street on the IRT Lexington Avenue Line. This clock shows the train's service, destination, estimated arrival time, chronological sequence, track on which the train is arriving, and whether the train is local or express.

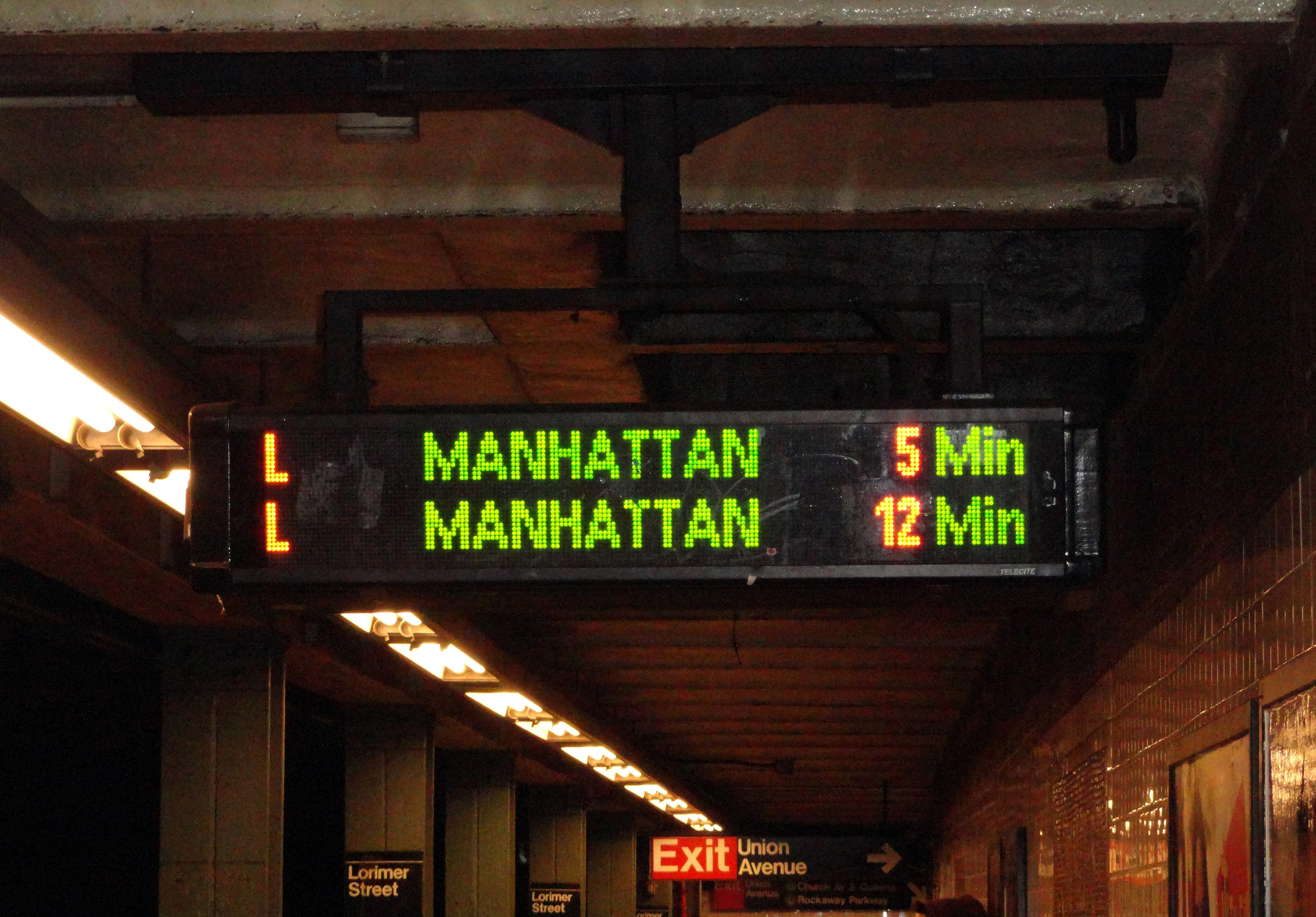
Detailed next-train signs of the type used on the BMT Canarsie Line, at Lorimer Street. This clock shows the train's service, destination, and estimated arrival time. Many of these clocks have since been replaced.

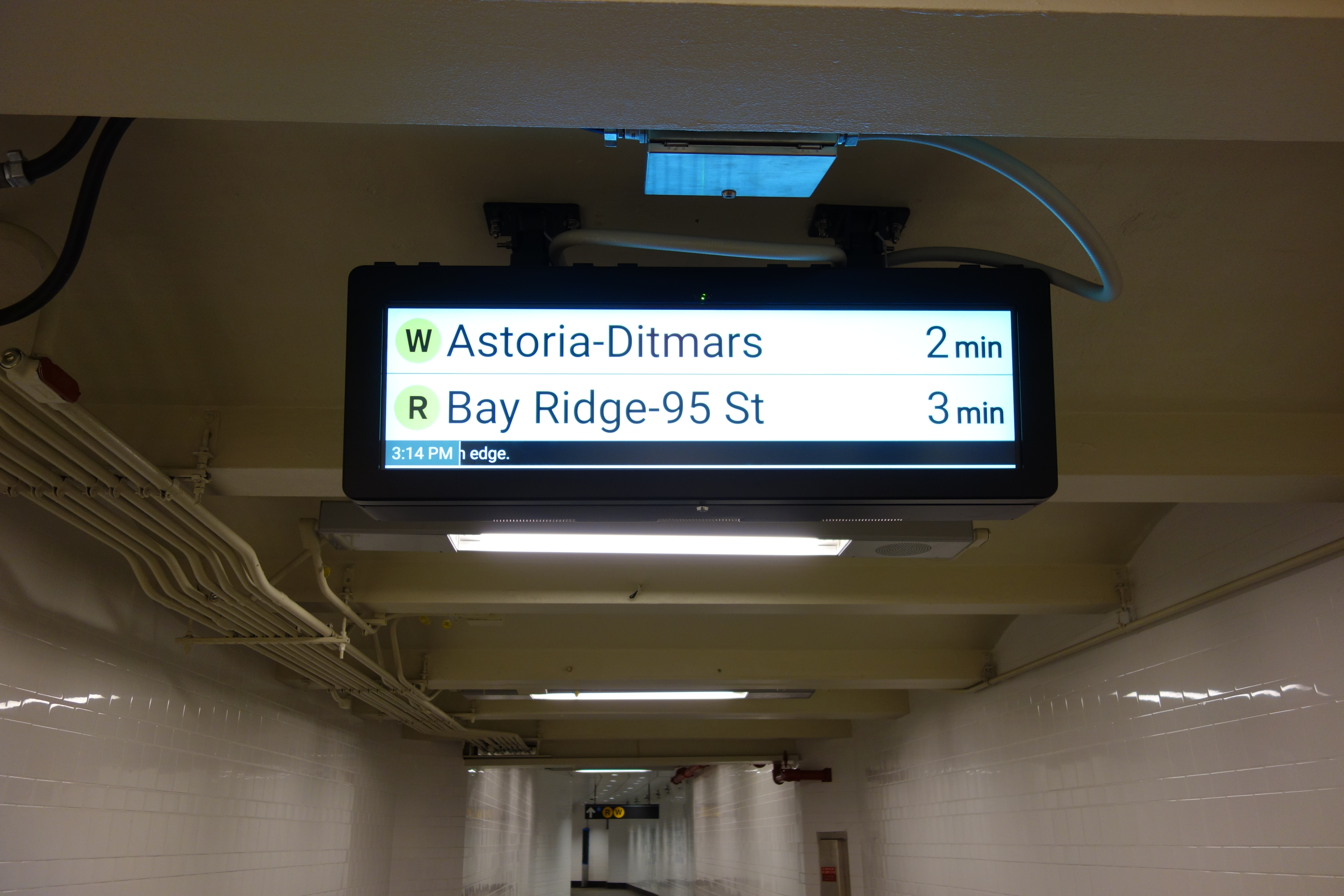
Detailed next-train signs of the type used on parts of the B Division, at Cortlandt Street on the BMT Broadway Line. This clock shows the train's service, destination, estimated arrival time, current clock time, weather, and service advisories.

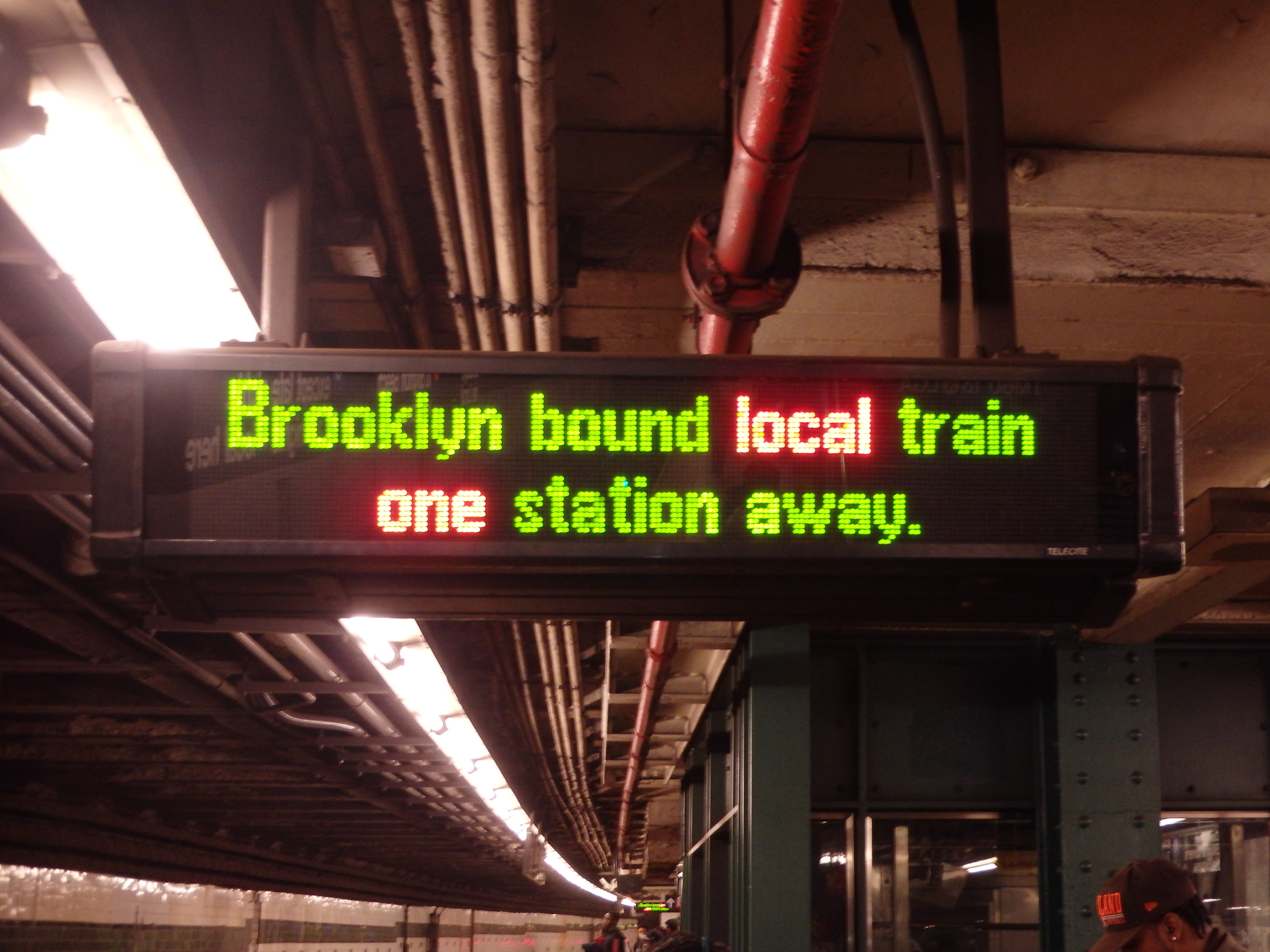
Simple next-train signs of the type used on parts of the B Division, at 125th Street on the IND Eighth Avenue Line. This clock shows the track on which the train is arriving, the number of stops away for the next train, and whether the train is local or express.

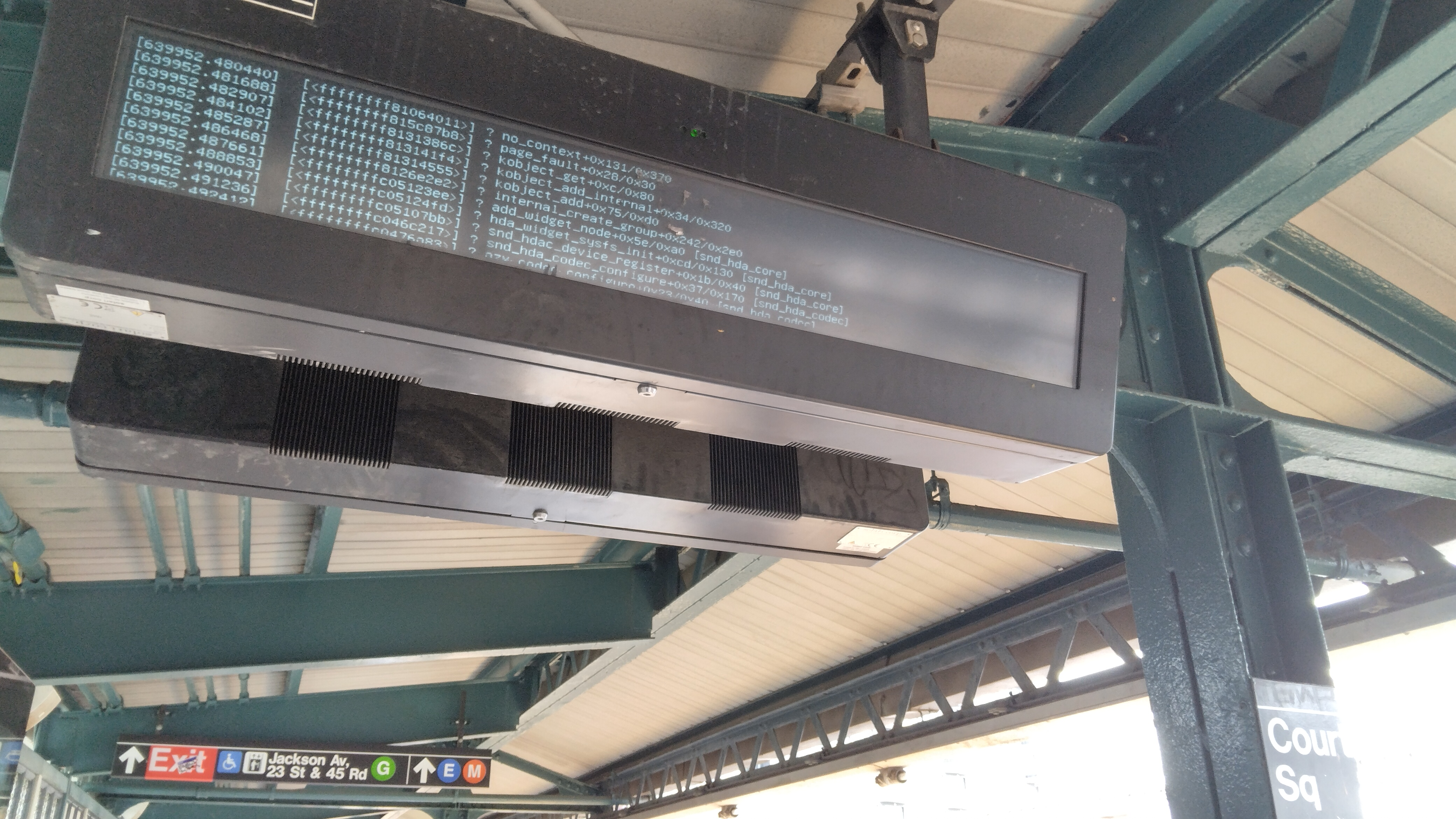
A kernel panic on a next arrival display at Court Square

=== Mainline A Division and Canarsie Line clocks ===
In 2003, the MTA signed a $160 million contract with Siemens Transportation Systems to install digital real-time message boards (officially Public Address Customer Information Screens, or PA/CIS) at 158 of its IRT stations to display the number of minutes until the arrival of the next trains. Payments to the company were stopped in May 2006 following many technical problems and delays and MTA started to look for alternative suppliers and technologies. In January 2007 Siemens announced that the issues had been resolved and that screens would start appearing at 158 stations by the end of the year. In 2008, the system-wide roll-out was pushed back again, to 2011, with the MTA citing technical problems.

An in-house simpler system developed by MTA for the L train was operational by early 2009 and the first three displays of the larger Siemens system became operational at stations on the IRT Pelham Line (6 and <6> trains) in the Bronx in December 2009. Siemens signs were in operation in 110 A Division stations by March 2011 and in 153 IRT mainline and 24 Canarsie Line stations by late 2011. Simpler countdown clocks, which only announce the track on which the train is arriving and the number of stops the train is from the station, are used at 40 stations. This includes 13 stations on the IND Queens Boulevard Line, 19 stations on the IND Eighth Avenue Line (including four that also have next-train displays that show this information), three stations on the BMT Broadway Line, and five stations on the BMT Astoria Line; however, the clocks on the Broadway and Astoria Lines are not in use as of 2016. The announcements are voiced by former radio traffic reporter Bernie Wagenblast and Carolyn Hopkins.

In 2012, real-time station information for the "mainline" IRT, comprising all the IRT services except the 7 train, was made available to third-party developers via an API, through MTA's Subway Time mobile app and as open data. In early 2014, data for the L train were also given to developers. Displays at 5 IRT Dyre Avenue Line stations were the last in the mainline A Division to be added, as a result of signal modernizations for IRT Dyre Avenue Line stations.

=== Mainline B Division and Flushing Line clocks ===
Displays at 267 B Division stations were funded as part of the 2015–2019 capital program. Upon the October 2015 approval of funding for the 2015–2019 capital program, full installation of the countdown clocks was deferred to beyond 2020, with 323 out of 472 stations (Note: This includes 320 out of the 469 stations (as of October 2015), plus three new stations on the Second Avenue Subway opened on January 1, 2017) having countdown clocks by then. This was attributed to the rate of installation of Wi-Fi and 3G systems in subway stations, which, among other things, makes countdown clocks viable. The B, D, and N were expected to get countdown clocks in 2016; the B and D would get the PA/CIS along their shared IND Concourse Line stations, the D along the BMT West End Line, and the N along the BMT Sea Beach Line. Meanwhile, the IRT Flushing Line (7 and <7>) was to get the clocks in 2018, a delay from an earlier announced date of 2016.

In August 2016, a 90-day testing period began for updated countdown clocks on eight BMT Broadway Line stations on the N, Q, R, and W services. The clocks feature new LCD screens as opposed to the old LED screens. The new countdown clocks show the date and time, current weather, next trains, advertisements, other media, and service changes, unlike the old countdown clocks, which can only show the date and time and the next train arrivals. The LCD clocks also use data from the Bluetooth receivers installed at the end of each platform in the stations, which connect with Bluetooth receivers installed on the first and last cars of every train. If the test was successful, the remaining 269 B Division stations would receive the new LCD countdown clocks. The MTA was able to speed up the test by using Bluetooth receivers and wireless data in stations. As opposed to the countdown clocks on the numbered lines, the system calculates when the trains will pull into their next stop based on when trains enter and leave the stations. The new Bluetooth clocks performed accurately 97% of the time.

In November 2016, the MTA declared the Broadway Line countdown clock test successful. All B Division stations would get countdown clocks by March 2018 (several years ahead of schedule), using the same Bluetooth technology as the clocks in the Broadway Line stations. The countdown clocks would use either existing and new Siemens tricolor LED displays like the ones on the A Division and across scattered parts of the B Division, or new multicolor LCD like the ones on the Broadway Line. The R was the first mainline B Division route to receive countdown clocks along its entire length in July 2017. Under the MTA's rollout schedule released in July 2017, the countdown clocks on other routes would be enabled in stages through December 2017, including on the L train, where the existing LED clocks would be upgraded to use the new LCDs. All of the countdown-clock data for the B Division services would also be available in the MTA's Subway Time app, in addition to the data for the A Division and L services that were already included in the app prior to the test.

The countdown clocks for the rest of the B Division were to be installed as part of the Integrated Service Information and Management – B Division (ISIM-B) project, which would upgrade signal towers and connect track circuits to a central database. The project was called the Beacon Train Arrival System, and all 268 underground stations would have it installed by the end of 2017. In each of the remaining 269 stations without countdown clocks, there would be two displays for each platform, as well as a single display installed just outside fare control. The cost would be around $31.7 million to install, plus $5 million in annual maintenance costs. Since the clocks are based on the Transit Wireless Wi-Fi, installation of each set of displays would cost $211,000 at every aboveground station (which did not have Transit Wireless as of 2016) and $54,000 at every underground station with Transit Wireless. The MTA would upgrade the aboveground stations so they could also get Wi-Fi capabilities.

As the first batch of Bluetooth-enabled B Division countdown clocks was installed in September 2017, there were some passenger complaints about the location of the clocks. Although the MTA places the clocks at the middle of each platform, as well as offers train arrival data on its Subway Time app, riders noted that these clocks were not always placed near locations where the riders would actually wait, such as the stairs to the platforms or the station entrances. Sometimes, the clocks were hidden behind signs or located far away from the station entrances. Riders also reported instances where the clocks froze, displayed the wrong information, projected wildly fluctuating arrival times, or forgot to display upcoming trains. All of the system's 472 stations had countdown clocks by New Year's Day 2018. The last route to get countdown clocks was the 7, which received Bluetooth-enabled clocks in December 2017 because of issues with the installation of communications-based train control on the Flushing Line. By the 2020s, the countdown clocks were also being used to display advertisements; the MTA earned $170 million a year from these advertisements.

== Fare collection ==
=== Fare collection media ===
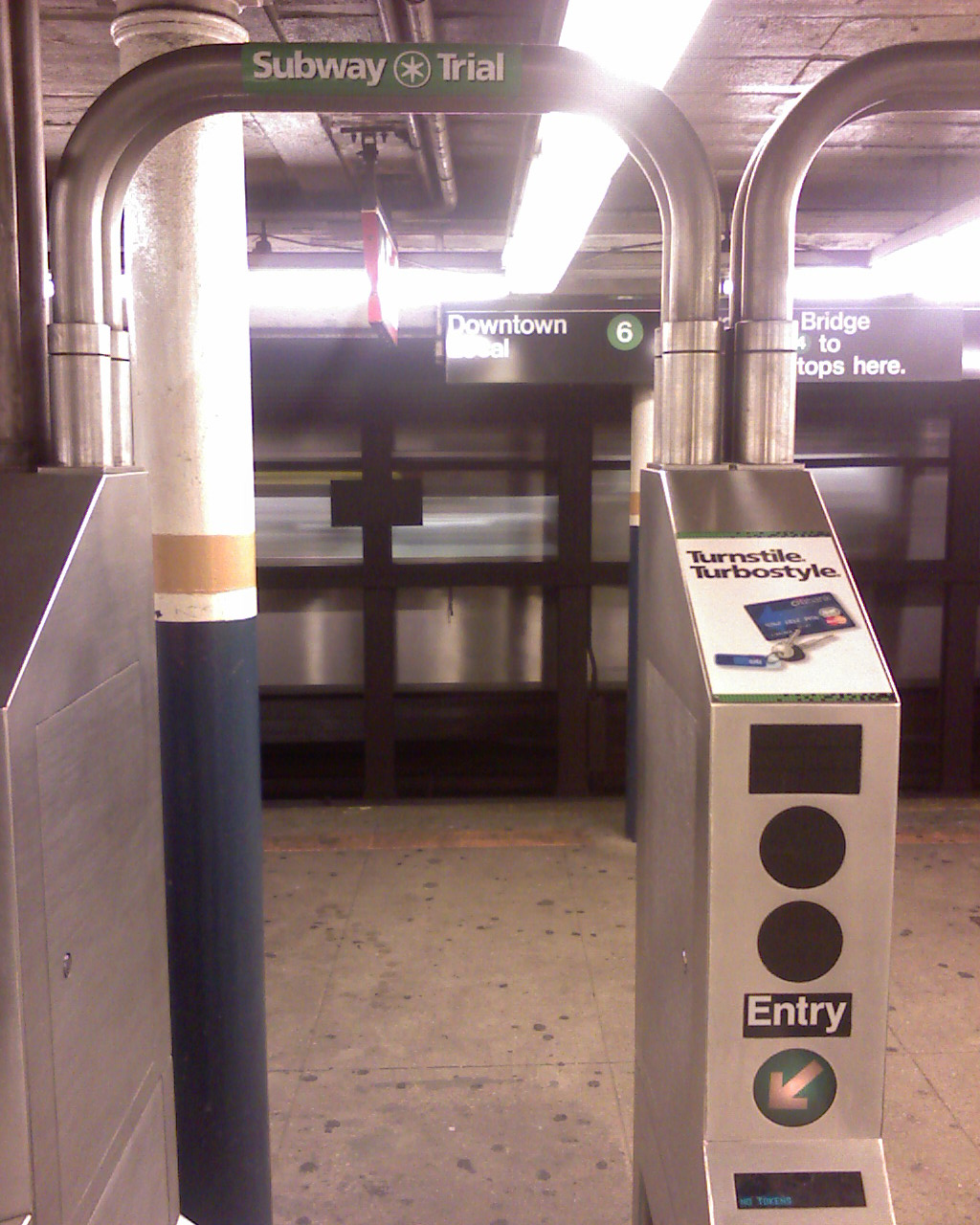
RFID trial on the IRT Lexington Avenue Line

Access to the paid area is by turnstile. Starting in 1992, MetroCards made by Cubic Transportation Systems replaced the subway tokens that had been used as the subway's form of fare payment from the 1950s on; by 2003, the MetroCard was the exclusive method of fare payment systemwide. Since then, there have been programs to replace the MetroCard itself. In the first program, introduced in early 2006, the MTA signed a deal with MasterCard to test out a new radio-frequency identification card payment scheme. Customers had to sign up at a special MasterCard website and use a MasterCard PayPass credit or debit card/tag to participate. Originally scheduled to end in December 2006, the trial was extended into 2007 due to "overwhelming positive response". In light of the success of the first PayPass pilot project in 2006, another trial was started by the MTA. This one started on June 1, 2010, and ended on November 30, 2010. The first two months started with the customer just using the MasterCard PayPass debit or credit card. However, this trial was the debut of having a rider use the VISA PayWave debit or credit card to enter the system, which started on August 1, 2010. The trial continued for six months.

In 2016, the MTA announced that it would begin designing a new contactless fare payment system to replace the MetroCard. The system would probably use phone- and bank card-based payment systems like Apple Pay and Android Pay. On October 23, 2017, it was announced that the MetroCard would be phased out and replaced by OMNY, a contactless fare payment system also by Cubic, with fare payment being made using Apple Pay, Google Wallet, debit/credit cards with near-field communication enabled, or radio-frequency identification cards. The OMNY system was rolled out starting in 2019, though support of the MetroCard is slated to remain until 2025. The fare system was criticized because the new turnstiles could be hacked, thereby leaving credit card and phone information vulnerable to theft.

=== Turnstiles ===
The New York City Subway primarily employs two types of turnstiles: a waist-high turnstile, and a full-height turnstile known as a High Entry-Exit Turnstile (HEET). The waist-high turnstiles, the most prominent in the system, were installed beginning in 1993 along with the implementation of MetroCard, though they originally accepted tokens. They are manufactured in Tennessee by Cubic Corporation. Some of the waist-high turnstiles date to the late 20th century, when tokens were used to pay fares; as such, they still have token-return compartments. The waist-high turnstiles are vulnerable to a practice called "back-cocking", in which people entering the system can partially rotate the turnstile as if they were exiting, then slip through the side of the turnstile without paying.

The newer HEETs resemble several older turnstiles of that design informally called "iron maidens", and are prevalent at subway entrances without token booths to discourage fare evasion. Both turnstiles are stainless steel and are bidirectional, allowing passengers to enter with fare payment and to exit. A third older type of turnstile, the High Exit Turnstile (HET), is a black-painted unidirectional iron maiden and only turns in the exiting direction. Entrance is also available via Service Entry gates or AutoGates, which cater primarily to handicapped passengers or passengers with large items such as strollers and luggage. These gates double as pushbar Emergency Exits, though they are often used for regular exiting in crowded stations. As a precaution against fare evasion, two-fifths of the system's emergency exit doors had been retrofitted with delayed-opening devices as of 2025, and security guards were staffed outside emergency exits. The delayed-opening devices, which prevent the door from opening until several seconds after the door is pushed, can be overridden by MTA staff in emergencies.

New turnstile designs were introduced in the 2020s. The MTA announced in 2021 that it would install wide-aisle fare gates for disabled passengers at five subway stations by mid-2022; the implementation of these fare gates was delayed by a year. Additionally, in an attempt to reduce fare evasion, the MTA exhibited several designs for half-height and full-height Plexiglas turnstiles in May 2023, which would replace the existing waist-high turnstiles. On December 4, 2023, the first wide aisle fare gates were installed at Sutphin Boulevard–Archer Avenue–JFK Airport station. Within two months, there was a slight increase in fare-paying riders at the station, although passengers were able to evade fares merely by leaning over the new turnstiles and activating the motion sensors. Following adjustments to the turnstiles, the MTA announced in May 2024 that the new turnstiles would be installed at fifteen stations by the end of that year, but the installation of the turnstiles was delayed. As of 2025, the MTA planned to install the new turnstiles at 150 stations in four years. By 2026, the newer Plexiglas turnstiles had reduced fare evasion by an average of 35% where they were installed.

The MTA has also tested out other features to prevent fare evasion. These have included low metal fins or "sleeves" on each arm of a turnstile, to dissuade potential fare evaders from squeezing through the gaps between the arms, as well as high spiked panels between separate turnstiles. In December 2025, the MTA announced that these features would be installed in almost every station.

== Help Point ==
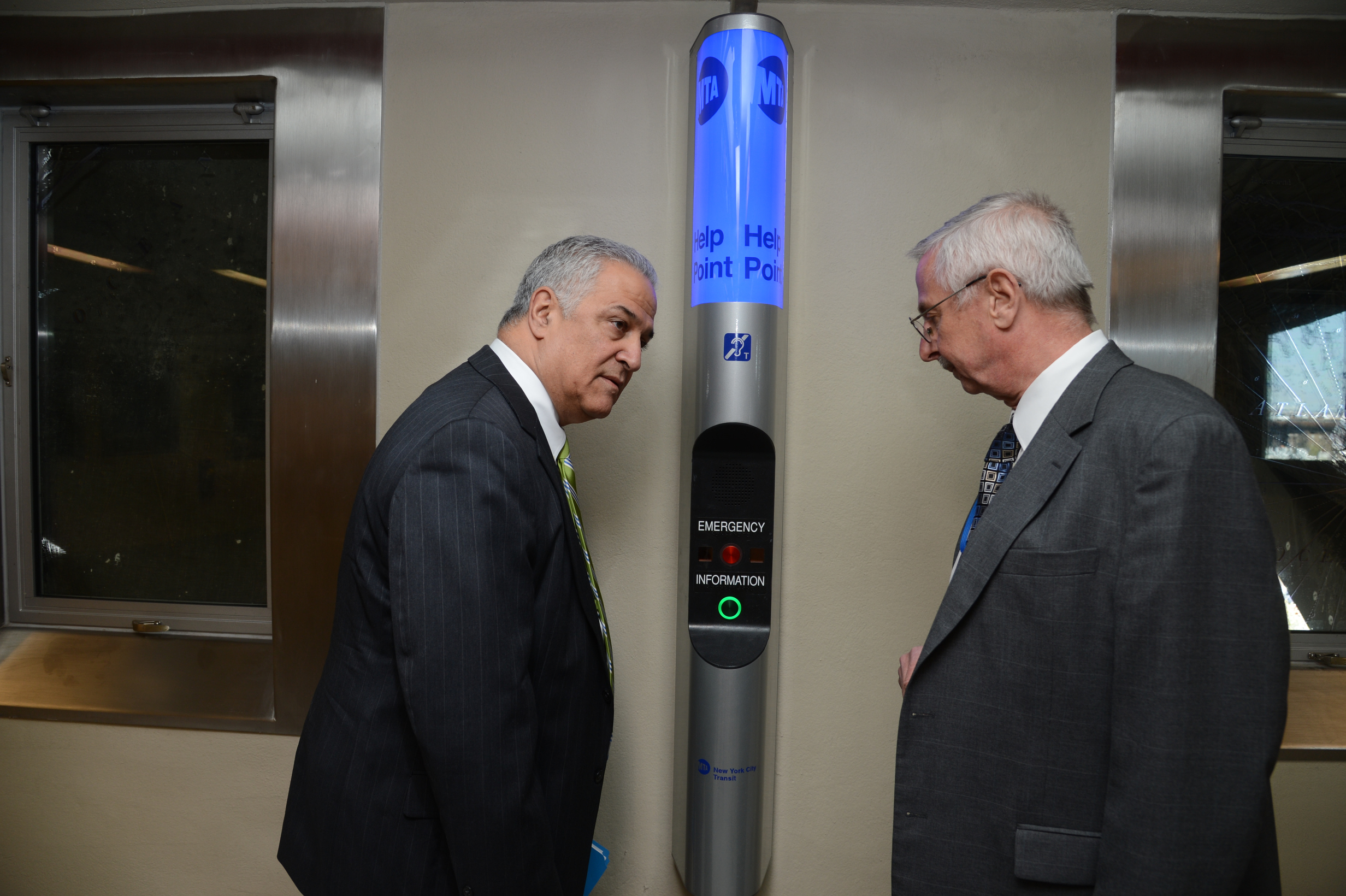
The Help Point at the Smith–Ninth Streets station

The MTA set up another technology pilot project called "Help Point" in April 2011. Help Point, a new digital-audio communications system, was designed for use in case of an emergency or to obtain subway information for travel directions. The top button is labeled red for emergencies and connects to the Rail Control Center. The bottom button is labeled green and connects to a MTA station agent for any inquiries. All units are equipped with a microphone and speaker, and can optionally be installed with a camera. Also, the test units were equipped for the hearing impaired (under ADA compliance).

The two subway stations that were part of this trial were on the IRT Lexington Avenue Line. They were the 23rd Street–Baruch College and the Brooklyn Bridge–City Hall stations. The Help Points at the Brooklyn Bridge–City Hall station were wireless, while those at the 23rd Street station ones were hard-wired, to test which type of transmission is best for the subway.

After the Help Point test was successfully completed, the MTA started to install Help Points in all 472 subway stations to replace the existing Customer Assistance Intercom (CAI) units. The help points were installed in 166 stations by 2014, at which time the remaining stations were scheduled to have Help Points by the end of 2019. The Help Point installation timeline was later accelerated to the end of 2017, and Boyce Technologies was hired to install the devices. The MTA finished installing over 3,000 Help Points in 2018 for a total of $252.7 million. A 2024 audit of the Help Points found that, during a six-month period in 2023, half of emergency calls made through Help Points were prank calls and that more than 1,000 emergency calls made through Help Points were not answered.

== On The Go! Travel Station ==
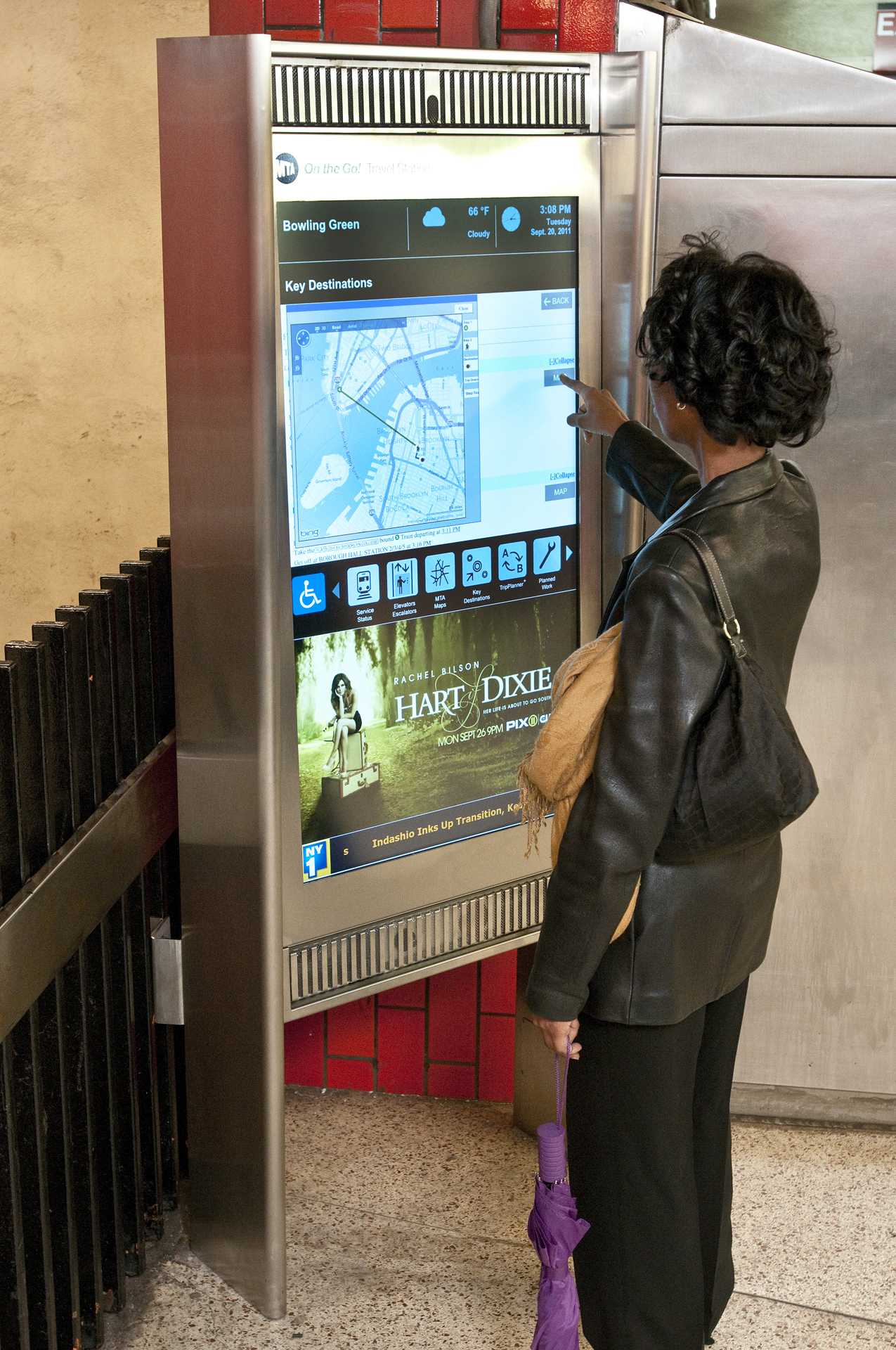
The On the Go! Travel Station in use at the Bowling Green station

On September 19, 2011, the MTA set up another pilot project, an online, interactive touchscreen computer program called "On the Go! Travel Station" (OTG). It lists any planned work or service changes occurring on the subway as well as information to help travelers find landmarks or locales near the stations with an OTG outlet, with advertisements as well. The first station to test this new technology was Bowling Green on the IRT Lexington Avenue Line. Other stations scheduled to participate in this program were Penn Station (with the LIRR), Grand Central Terminal (with Metro-North), Atlantic Avenue–Barclays Center in Brooklyn, and Jackson Heights–Roosevelt Avenue/74th Street–Broadway in Queens.

New and existing On the Go! kiosks were to receive an interface overhaul as a result of the MTA's partnership with Control Group, a technology and design consultancy firm. Control Group were adding route lookups, countdown to train arrivals, and service alerts. Between 47 and 90 interactive wayfinding kiosks were scheduled to be deployed in 2013. As of January 2016, there are 155 kiosks at 31 stations. At the completion of Phase 2, there was to be a total of 380 kiosks installed. By 2020, these had been supplanted by digital screens systemwide.

== Cellular phone and wireless data ==
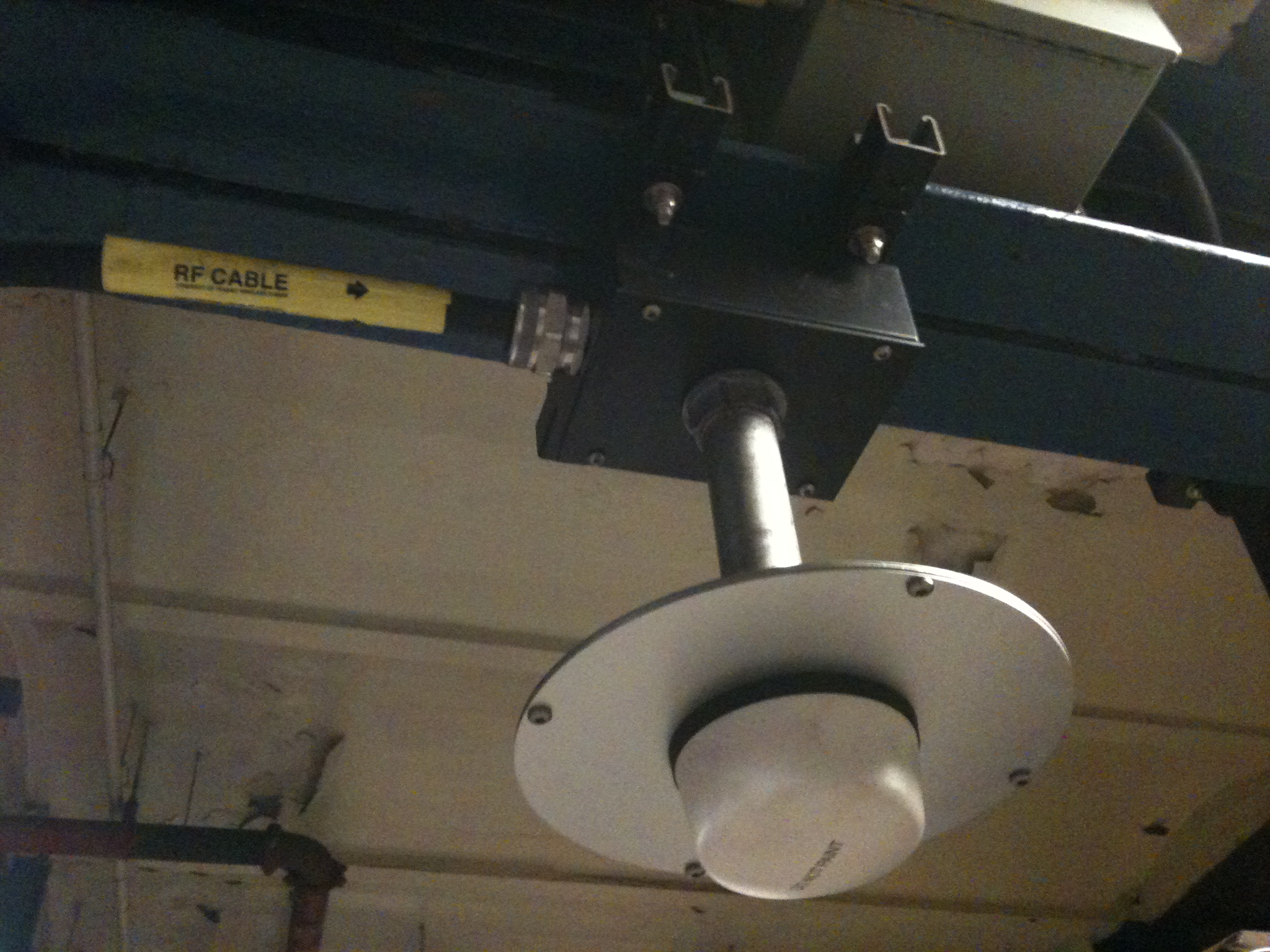
An indoor antenna, part of the distributed antenna system installed by Transit Wireless inside a station

In 2005, Transit Wireless, a BAI Communications majority-owned company, was formed in order to compete for the MTA's request for proposals for a wireless network in the subway system. The MTA ultimately awarded the contract for building and operating the network to Transit Wireless. The New York City Subway began to provide underground cellular phone with voice and data service, and free Wi-Fi to passengers in 2011 at six stations in Chelsea, Manhattan. The new network was installed and owned by Transit Wireless as part of the company's $200 million investment. The company expanded the services to 30 more stations in 2013 and signed an agreement with all 4 major wireless network operators (Verizon Wireless, AT&T, Sprint, and T-Mobile) to allow their cellular phone customers to use its network. The MTA and Transit Wireless are splitting the fees received from those wireless carriers for the usage of the network. The Wi-Fi service, which operates using antennae, is operated by Boingo Wireless.

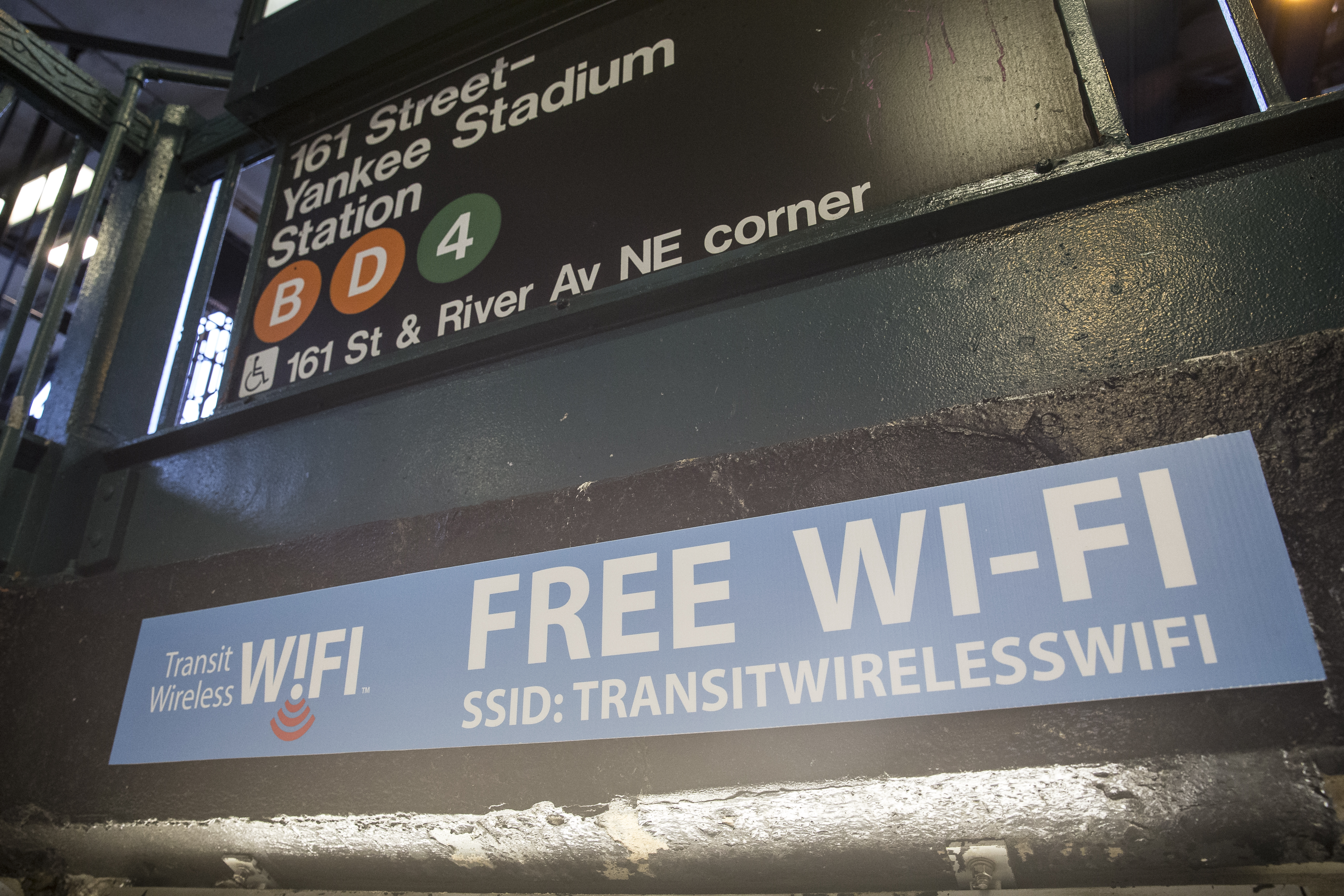
Poster announcing free Wi-Fi

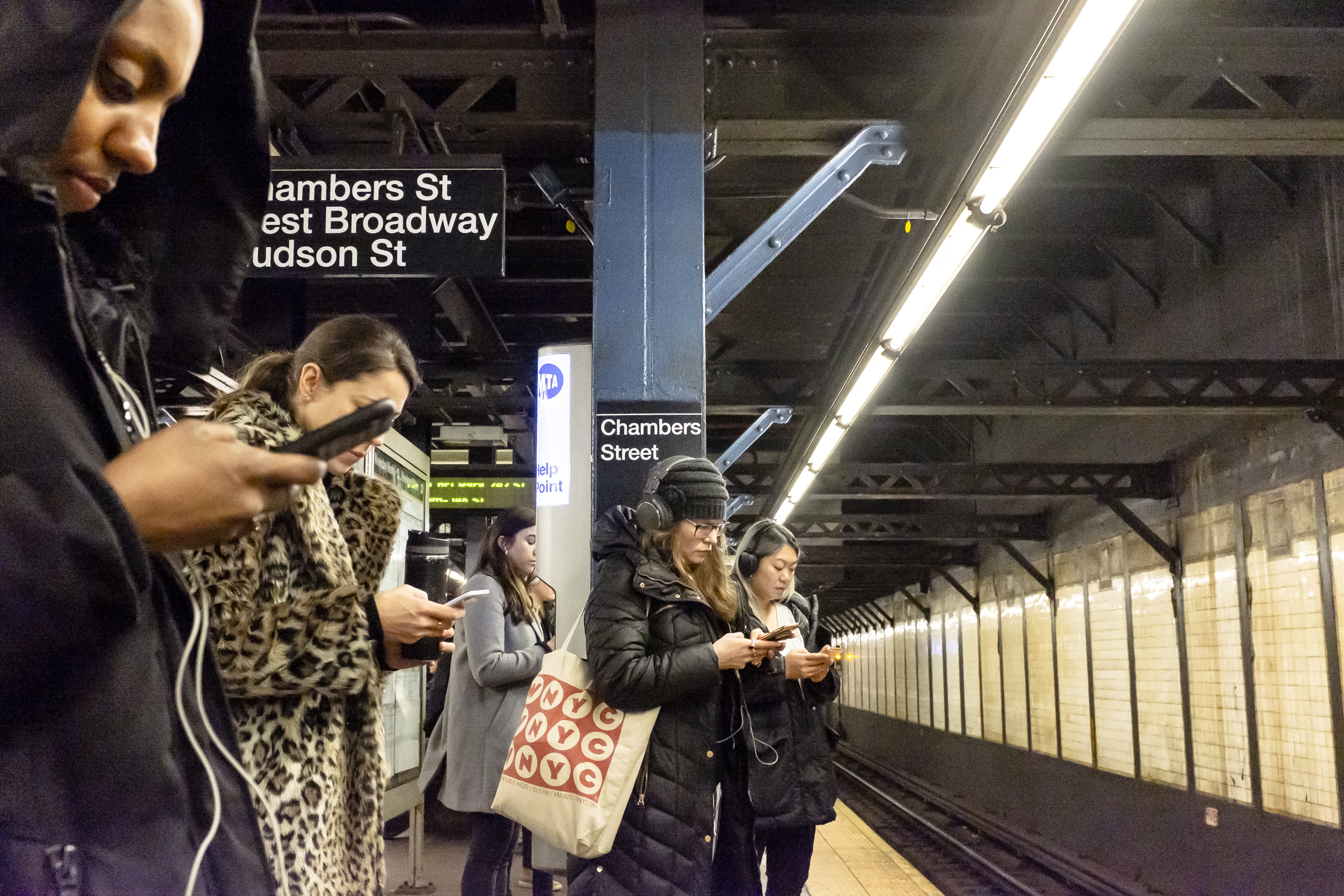
Passengers using smartphones at a subway station

Transit Wireless expected to provide service to the remaining 241 underground stations by 2017. The next 40 key stations (11 in midtown Manhattan and 29 in Queens) have antennas that were in service by March 2014. The wireless for these 40 underground stations were completed by October 2014. Phase 3 of the project was completed in March 2015 and added service to the Flushing–Main Street station in Queens, as well as stations in Lower Manhattan, West Harlem, and Washington Heights. Phase 4 of the project covered 20 underground stations in the Bronx and seventeen in Upper Manhattan; this phase, completed in November 2015, provided service to major stations such as Lexington Avenue–53rd Street, Lexington Avenue–59th Street, 149th Street–Grand Concourse, and 125th Street. Because Governor Andrew Cuomo had implemented a timeline for accelerated implementation of in-station wireless service, phases 6 and 7 of the Transit Wireless network build-out will connect the 90 remaining Brooklyn and Manhattan underground stations by early 2017, about one year ahead of the original completion date of 2018.

In late December 2016, it was expected that all stations would have wireless by the final day of that year. However, Governor Cuomo later announced that by January 9, 2017, cellular connectivity and wireless service would be available in all underground stations, except at four stations. (As of March 2020, this is not yet the case.) These stations were the New South Ferry station and the three stations on the BMT Fourth Avenue Line–Prospect Avenue, 53rd Street, and Bay Ridge Avenue—that would have wireless installed as part of their Enhanced Station renovations. Cellular connectivity was completed one year early. The entire project was completed for $300 million, with Transit Wireless sharing revenues derived from the network's service with the MTA. The partnership between Transit Wireless and the MTA is for 27 years. Wi-Fi and cellular service are currently available in all underground stations except Pelham Parkway on the Dyre Avenue line.

In June 2016, the MTA began installing Wi-Fi in subway cars as well. Wireless service was installed on four R160 subway cars assigned to the Jamaica Yard, then tested along the all-underground E route; in-car Wi-Fi was expanded to 20 R160s on the E route by September. However, this pilot program was not advertised to passengers. In addition, the wireless service was not working all the time; one passenger described the signal on board the trains as spotty, and only really available on the platforms. At the time, the MTA was not planning to retrofit subway tunnels with wireless service. Still, this in-car Wi-Fi pilot program is part of the wider program to install Wi-Fi in underground stations and onboard newer MTA buses. Future subway cars, like the R211, will also include Wi-Fi upon their delivery.

In 2017, the MTA partnered with NYC Public Libraries, New York State, and Transit Wireless, to create Subway Library, a system that allows users to choose from a selection of e-books to read for free when connected to TransitWireless Wi-Fi.

Despite the rollout of Wi-Fi at almost all underground stations, wireless and cellular data are generally not available in the tunnels between the stations. In early 2018, the MTA started testing out Wi-Fi in the 42nd Street Shuttle tunnels. During the 14th Street Tunnel shutdown in 2019–2020, the MTA added cellular service to the portion of the 14th Street Tunnel that travels under the East River. In July 2022, MTA officials announced plans to add cellular service to 418 miles (673 km) of tunnels across the network. In addition, internet service would be added to the 191 subway stations above ground level and the 21 stations in the Staten Island Railway network. The same month, the MTA awarded a $600 million contract to Transit Wireless for the installation of cellular and Wi-Fi equipment at these stations and in subway tunnels. In September 2024, the 42nd Street Shuttle tunnels became the first in the system to be fully equipped with 5G cell service. The next year, Boldyn Networks installed 5G equipment in the Joralemon Street Tunnel and in tunnels used by the G train (specifically on the IND Crosstown Line and IND Culver Line). Cellular service was extended to the southern part of the IRT Lexington Avenue Line and the remainder of the Crosstown Line in March 2026.

== Digital screens ==
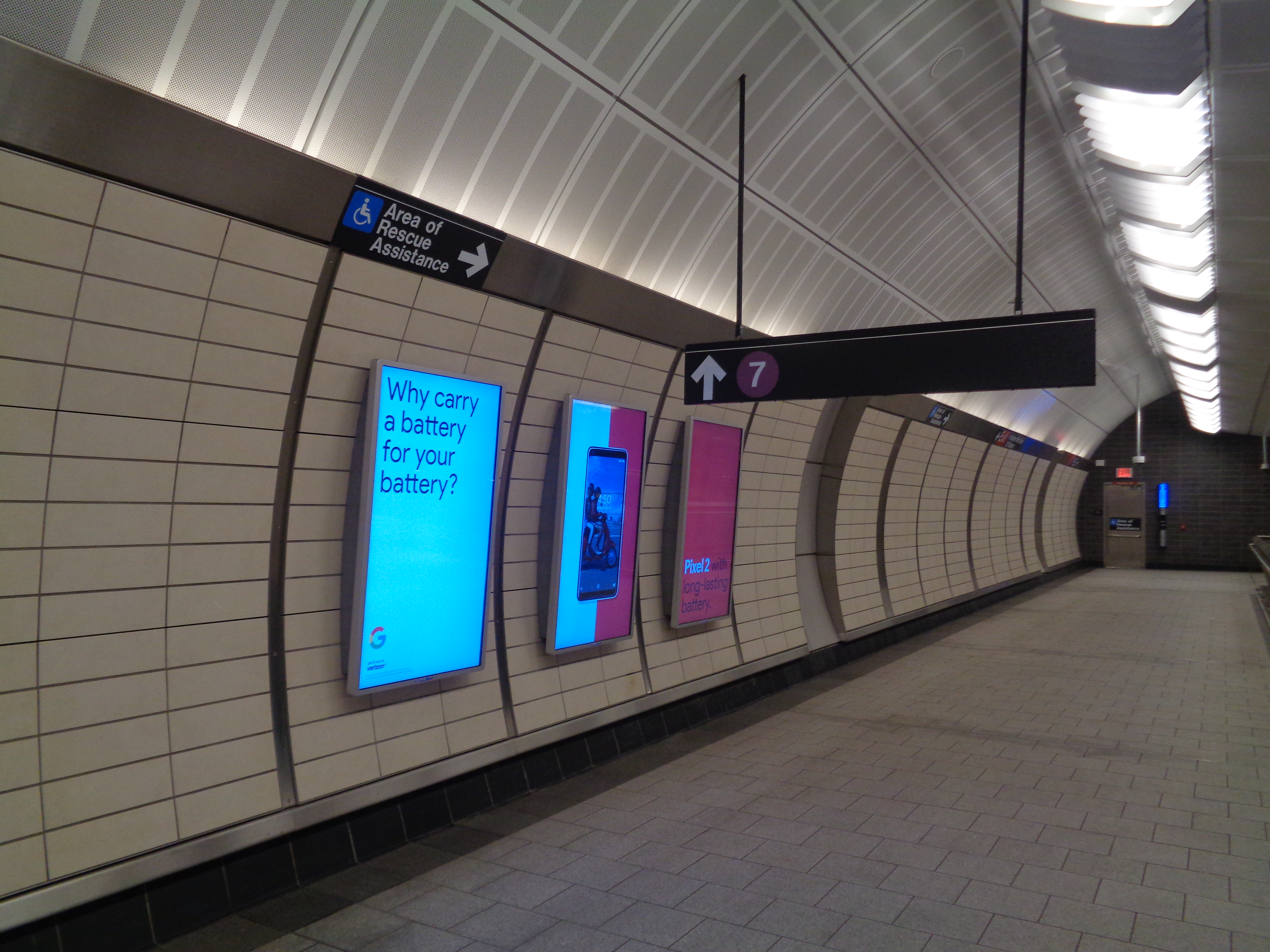
One of the information and advertising screens seen at 34th Street–Hudson Yards station.

The first major wave of digital advertisements in the subway were introduced with the deployment of the On the Go! Travel Station in 2011. From 2016 on, the LCD countdown clocks also provided another way to show advertisements to passengers.

In September 2017, the MTA announced plans to add 31,000 digital advertising screens in 5,134 cars, as well as 9,500 extra screens in stations, far more than what the clocks or travel stations could provide. The advertising screens were installed by Outfront Media from 2019 to 2022. There would eventually be 50,000 screens systemwide; the screens would also show service information. Prior to the announcement, most of the few digital advertising displays in use systemwide had been used to advertise the Second Avenue Subway's opening earlier that year. In 2020, the MTA started displaying real-time service metrics on the screens, such as service changes and dynamic transfer information. By then, the subway system had 5,000 such screens, with another 9,000 to be installed by September 2021 at a cost of $100 million. The screens cost $800 million in total.

The displays were vulnerable to vandalism. The MTA received over 600 reports of shattered or cracked digital screens between August 2020 and April 2023, although the website thecity.nyc implied that the actual number of damaged screens could be much higher. By 2025, there were 10,000 screens systemwide, which accounted for a large portion of the subway's $175 million annual advertising revenue.
