= Transit Wireless =

American telecommunications company

Transit Wireless, LLC
- Type: Private Subsidiary
- Founded: 2005
- Headquarters: New York City, New York, United States
- Products: Distributed antenna system
- Services: Cellular phone and wireless data
- Parent: BAI Communications
- Website: transitwireless.com

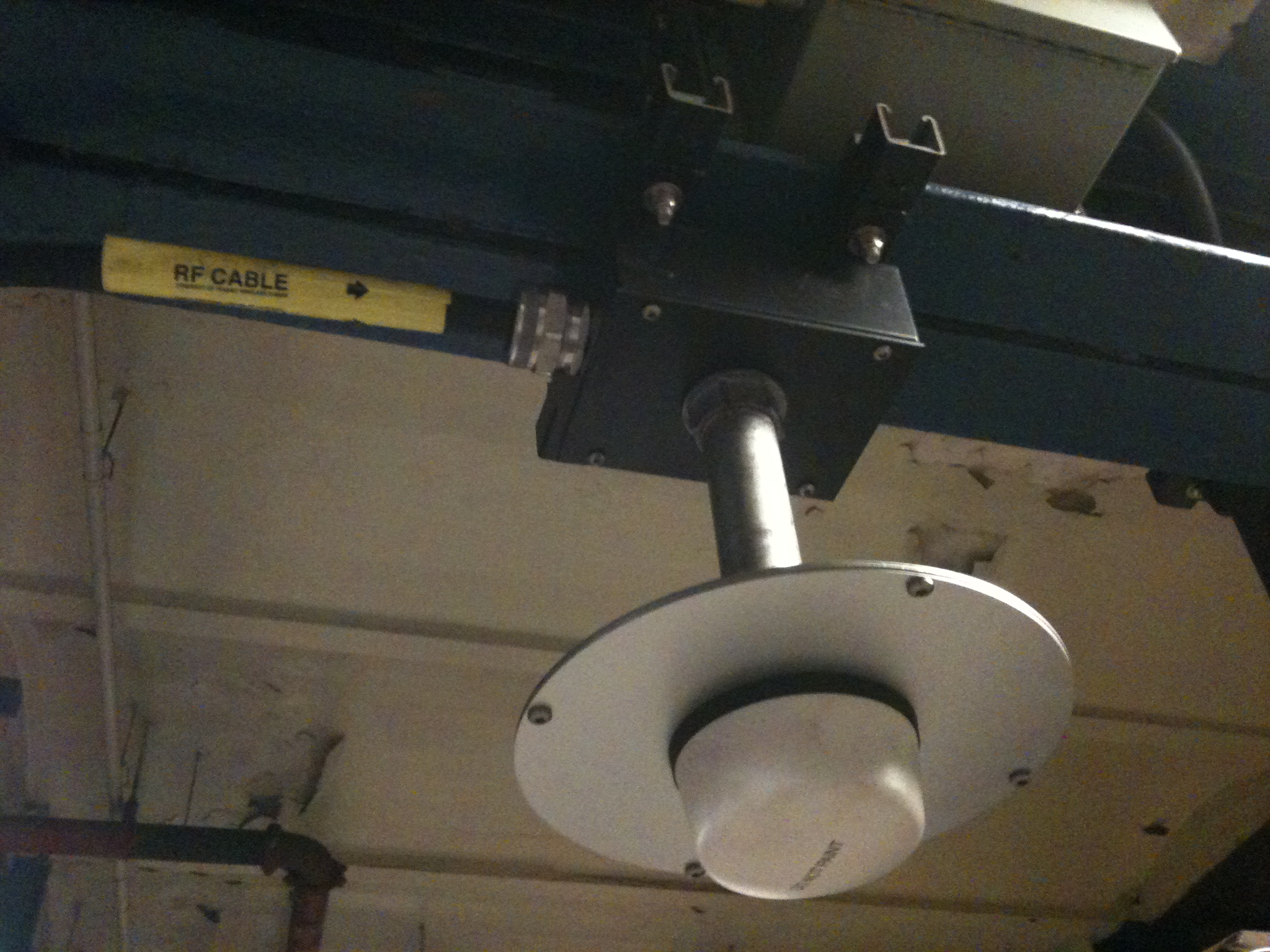
An indoor DAS antenna installed by Transit Wireless inside a New York City Subway station

Transit Wireless is an American telecommunication company founded in 2005, based in New York City. It was formed as a consortium of several entities, including Dianet Communications. It specializes in building wireless communication infrastructure using distributed antenna system networks to provide Wi-Fi and cellular phone coverage in the places that are unreachable by traditional cellular phone services such as in the underground portions of the New York City Subway. In 2010, the company was injected with financial support from infrastructure company BAI Communications for its first project with the New York City Transit Authority, which consisted of adding wireless access to subway stations. The architectural framework for the system and wireless engineering efforts were led by RF designer Mark Parr. The resulting wireless solution grew to provide coverage for hundreds of stations and serve well over a billion riders annually. The company is now a subsidiary of BAI Communications.
