= 67th Avenue station =

New York City Subway station in Queens

67 Avenue
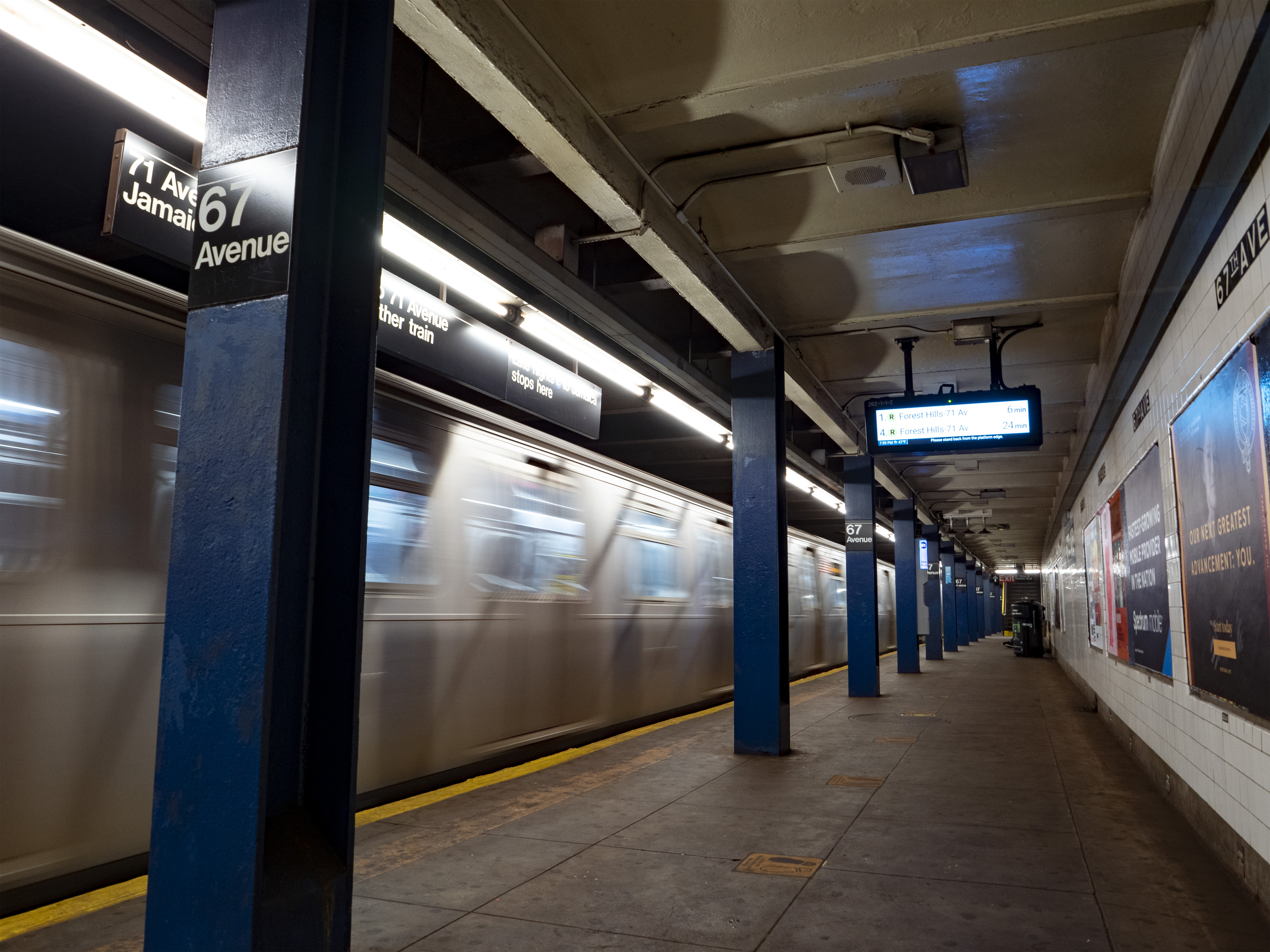
- R160 R train departing from the northbound platform

Station statistics
- Address: 67th Avenue & Queens Boulevard; Forest Hills, New York
- Borough: Queens
- Locale: Forest Hills, Rego Park
- Coordinates: 40.726966°N 73.853703°W
- Division: B (IND)
- Line: IND Queens Boulevard Line
- Services: E (late nights); F (late nights); M (weekdays during the day); R (all times except late nights)
- Transit: MTA Bus: Q60, QM11, QM18
- Structure: Underground
- Platforms: 2 side platforms
- Tracks: 4

Other information
- Opened: December 31, 1936; 89 years ago

Traffic
- 2025: 1,828,980 ▲7.2%
- Rank: 193 out of 423
Services
Preceding station	New York City Subway	Following station
63rd Drive–Rego Park E F M R via 36th Street	Local	Forest Hills–71st Avenue E F M R Terminus
does not stop here
Location
Location within New York City Subway
Location within New York City
Location within New York
Track layout
Street map
Station service legend
Symbol	Description
Stops all times except late nights	Stops all times except late nights
Stops late nights only	Stops late nights only
Stops weekdays during the day	Stops weekdays during the day

The 67th Avenue station is a local station on the IND Queens Boulevard Line of the New York City Subway. Located at the intersection of 67th Avenue and Queens Boulevard on the border of Forest Hills and Rego Park in Queens, it is served by the M train on weekdays, and by the R train at all times except late nights, when the E and F trains take over service.

== History ==
The Queens Boulevard Line was one of the first lines built by the city-owned Independent Subway System (IND), and stretches between the IND Eighth Avenue Line in Manhattan and 179th Street and Hillside Avenue in Jamaica, Queens. The Queens Boulevard Line was in part financed by a Public Works Administration (PWA) loan and grant of $25,000,000. In 1934 and 1935, construction of the extension to Jamaica was suspended for 15 months and was halted by strikes. Construction was further delayed due to a strike in 1935, instigated by electricians opposing wages paid by the General Railway Signal Company. By August 1935, work had resumed on the 67th Avenue station and three other stations on the Queens Boulevard Line.

On December 31, 1936, the IND Queens Boulevard Line was extended by eight stops, and 3.5 miles (5.6 km), from its previous terminus at Roosevelt Avenue to Union Turnpike, and the 67th Avenue station opened as part of this extension. The E train, which initially served all stops on the new extension, began making express stops in April 1937, and local GG trains began serving the extension at the time.

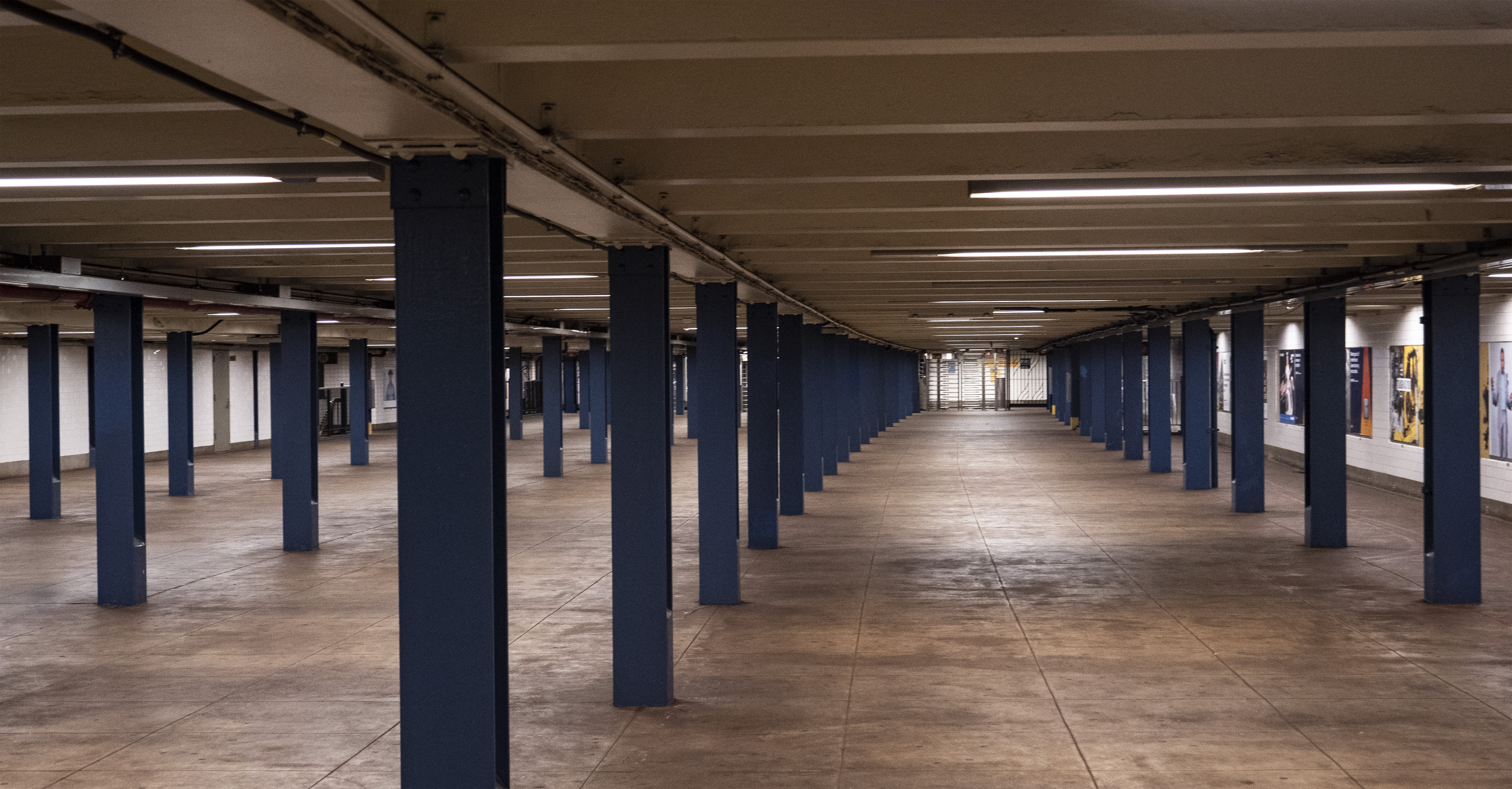
Mezzanine level

On February 5, 1962, the 67th Drive entrance to the station and a change booth opened. The entrance included three low turnstiles and two high exit turnstiles. This entrance has been built along with the rest of the station, but had not been opened until this point because the station's ridership had not warranted it.

Under the 2015–2019 Metropolitan Transportation Authority Capital Program, the station, along with thirty other New York City Subway stations, was scheduled to undergo a complete overhaul. This station would have been entirely closed for up to 6 months. Updates were to include cellular service, Wi-Fi, charging stations, improved signage, and improved station lighting. However, these renovations were deferred until the 2020–2024 Capital Program due to a lack of funding.

== Station layout ==
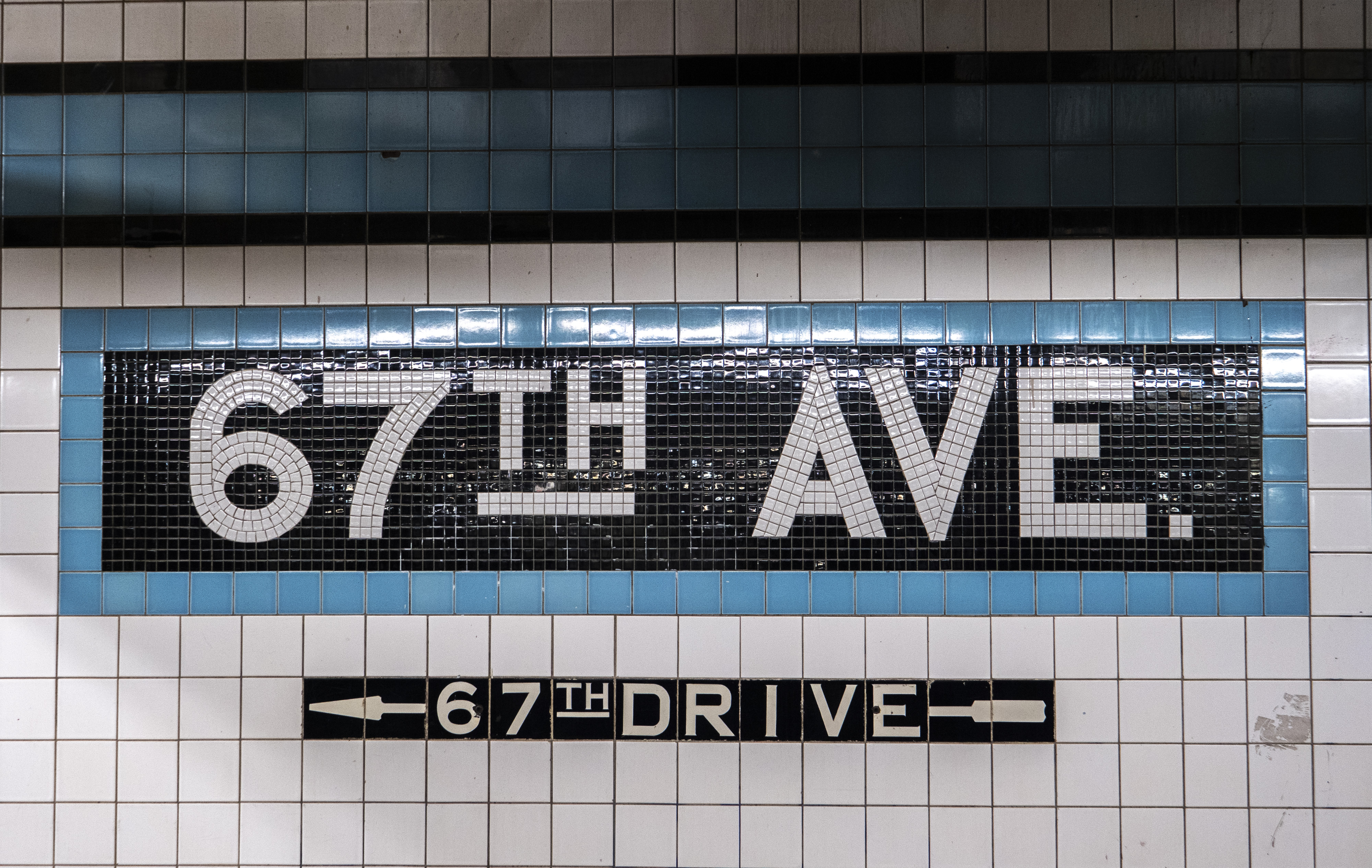
Mosaic name tablet

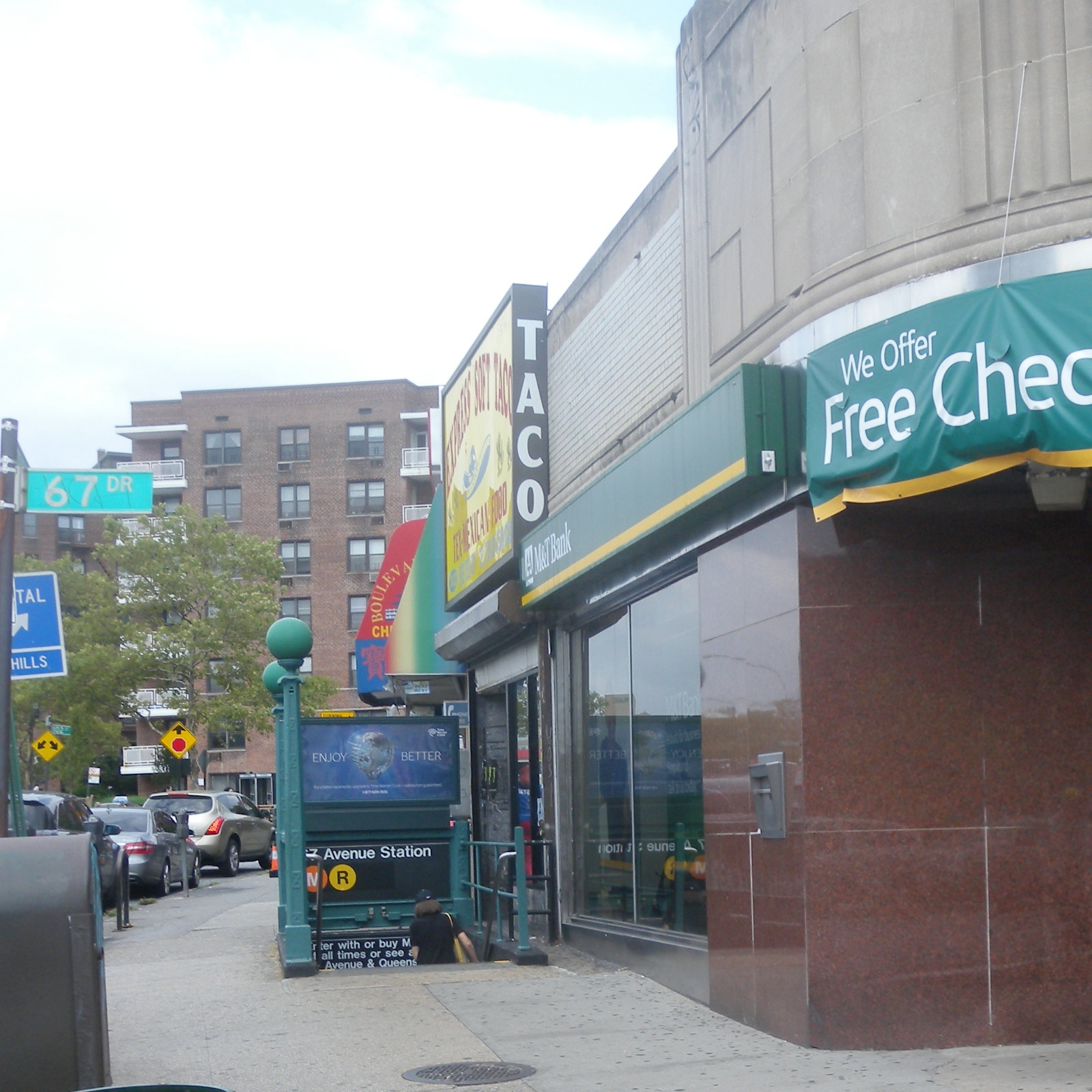
Easternmost stair

There are four tracks and two side platforms; the two center express tracks are used by the E and F trains at all times except late nights. The E and F trains serve the station at night, the M train serves the station on weekdays during the day, and the R train serves the station at all times except late nights. The station is between 63rd Drive–Rego Park to the west and Forest Hills–71st Avenue to the east. Black columns separate them from the local tracks, some of which have a "67TH AVE" sign on them in black lettering on a white background.

Fixed platform barriers, which are intended to prevent commuters falling to the tracks, are positioned near the platform edges. Both platform walls have a blue tile band with a black border and mosaic name tablets reading "67TH AVE." in white sans-serif lettering on a black background and matching blue border. Small tile captions reading "67TH AVE" in white lettering on black run below the trim line, and directional signs in the same style are present below some of the name tablets. The tile band was part of a color-coded tile system used throughout the IND. The tile colors were designed to facilitate navigation for travelers going away from Lower Manhattan. As such, the blue tiles used at the 67th Avenue station are also used at Jackson Heights–Roosevelt Avenue, the next express station to the west, while a different tile color is used at Forest Hills–71st Avenue, the next express station to the east. Blue tiles are similarly used at the other local stations between Roosevelt Avenue and 71st Avenue.

Dark blue I-beam columns run along both platforms for their entire length with alternating ones having the standard black name plate in white lettering. The I-beam piers are located every 15 feet (4.6 m) and support girders above the platforms. The roof girders are also connected to columns in the walls adjoining each platform.

The tunnel is covered by a U-shaped trough that contains utility pipes and wires. The outer walls of this trough are composed of columns, spaced approximately every 5 feet (1.5 m) with concrete infill between them. There is a 1-inch (25 mm) gap between the tunnel wall and the platform wall, which is made of 4-inch (100 mm)-thick brick covered over by a tiled finish. The columns between the tracks are also spaced every 5 feet (1.5 m), with no infill.

=== Exits ===
The station has a full length mezzanine, which also have dark blue I-beam columns, above the platforms. There are six staircases to each platform and the fare control areas are at either ends. The full-time one is at the west (railroad south) end. It has a turnstile bank, token booth, and two street stairs to either eastern corner of Queens Boulevard and 67th Avenue. The station's other fare control area at the east (railroad north) end is un-staffed, containing full height turnstiles, no booth, and two street stairs to either eastern corner of Queens Boulevard and 67th Drive.
