= Recommendation =

Recommendation may refer to:

- European Union recommendation, in international law
- Letter of recommendation, in employment or academia
- W3C recommendation, in Internet contexts
- A computer-generated recommendation created by a recommender system

== See also ==
- Commendation (disambiguation)
- Commend
