= Bentley Hotel (New York City) =

Hotel in Manhattan, New York

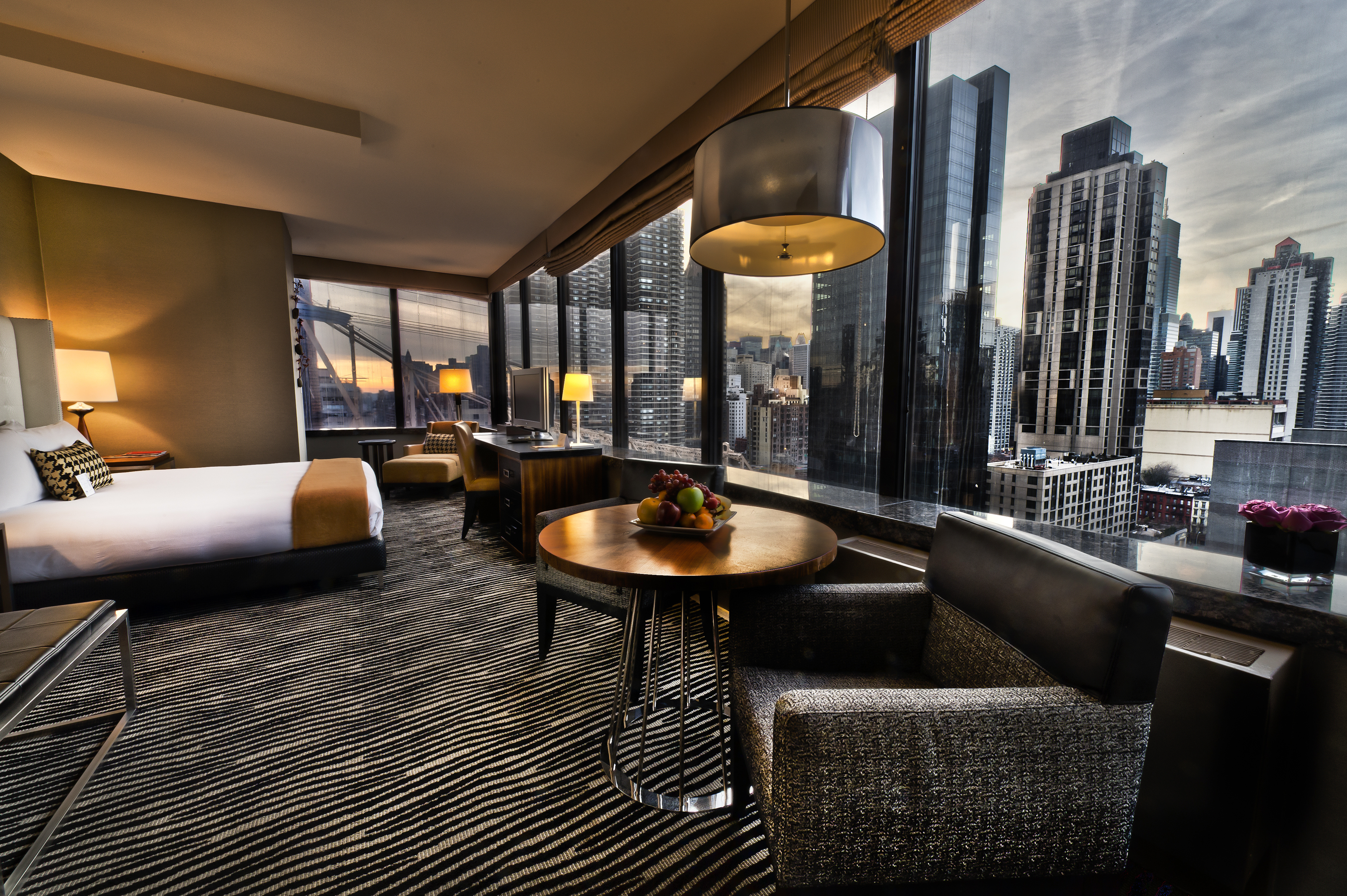
- Junior Suite inside the Bentley Hotel NYC

- Location within New York City

General information
- Type: Hotel
- Location: Upper East Side, 500 East 62nd St., New York City, United States
- Coordinates: 40°45′37″N 73°57′29.5″W
- Relocated: 1998

Technical details
- Floor count: 21

Other information
- Number of rooms: 197

Website
- Official website

The Bentley Hotel was a hotel in Manhattan's Upper East Side, in the U.S. state of New York.

== Description ==
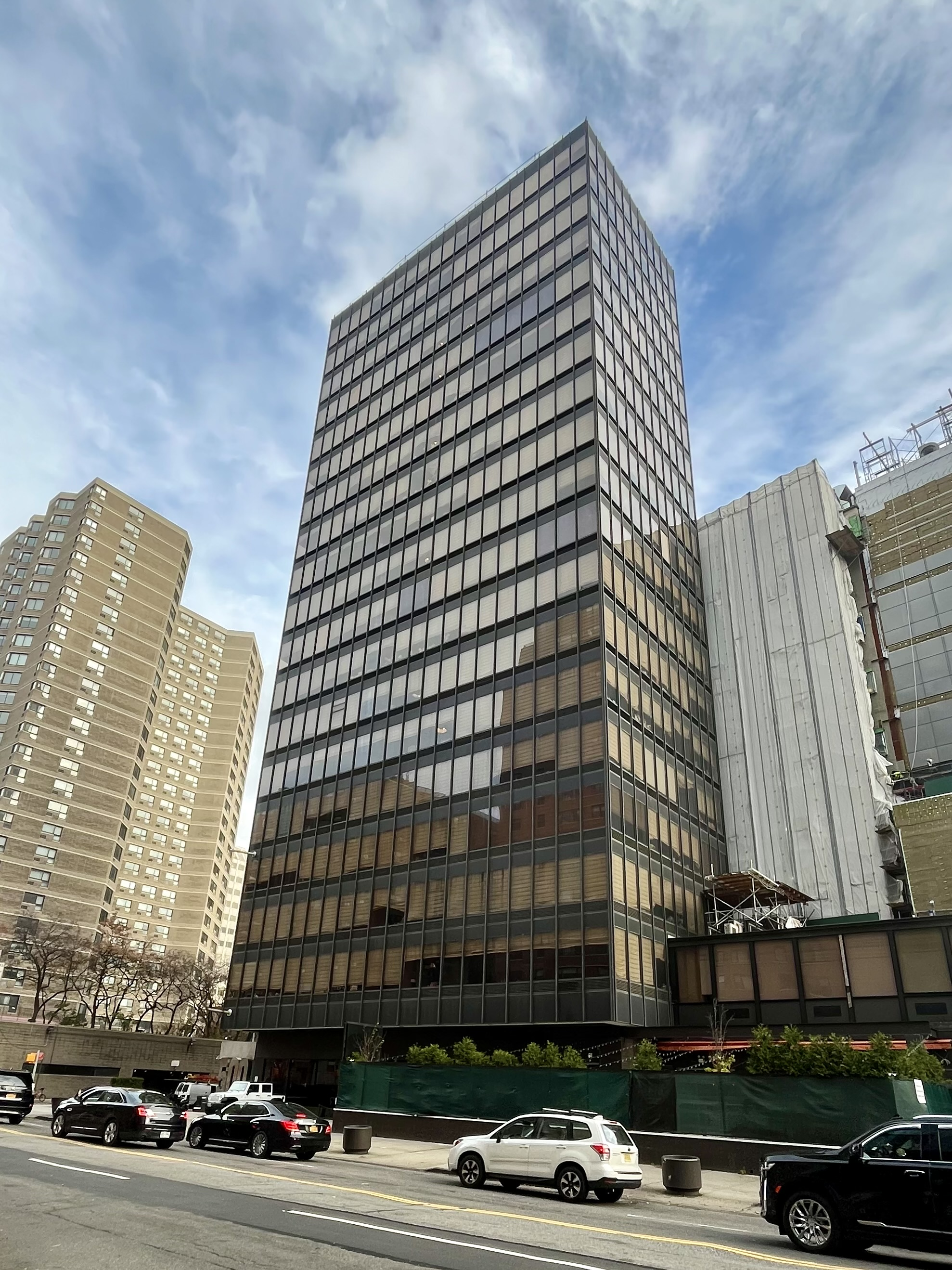
Bentley Hotel in 2023

The 21-story hotel, converted from an office building in 1998, has 197 rooms, as of 2010. Many rooms offer views of the East River and Queensboro Bridge. New York magazine's Nick Divito described the hotel as "a former high-rise office building that's been converted into a beacon of contemporary and surprisingly comfortable style. Think bright lights, boxy leather sofas and brushed-steel side tables."

== History ==
Joey Allaham opened the rooftop kosher restaurant Prime at the Bentley in 2012.

On May 8, 2020, the hotel's doors were opened to the city's local homeless population in order to curb the spread of COVID-19 and ease overcrowding at homeless shelters during the 2019–20 coronavirus pandemic.

== Reception ==
Bentley ranks number 209 on U.S News & World Report's list of "Best New York City Hotels".
