= Condemned =

Condemned or The Condemned may refer to:

== Legal ==
- Persons awaiting execution
- A condemned property, or condemned building, by a local authority, usually for public health or safety reasons
- A condemned property seized by power of eminent domain

== Media ==
=== Film ===
- Condemned (1923 film), an American silent comedy starring Mildred Davis
- Condemned (1929 film), an American melodrama starring Ronald Colman
- Condemned (1953 film), a Spanish melodrama
- The Condemned (1975 film), a 1975 Austrian-West German drama
- Condemned (1984 film), a Filipino film noir
- The Condemned, a 2007 American action film
- The Condemned 2, a 2015 action film, sequel to the 2007 film
- Condemned (2015 film), an American horror film

=== Video game ===
- Condemned: Criminal Origins, a 2005 survival horror video game
- Condemned 2: Bloodshot, the sequel to the first video game

=== Other media ===
- "Condemned" (Daredevil), 6th episode of the 1st season of Daredevil
- "Condemned" (Stargate Atlantis), an episode of the television series Stargate Atlantis
- The Condemned (audio drama), based on the Doctor Who television series

== See also ==
- Condemnation (disambiguation)
