= Poor housing =

Poor housing may refer to:

- Affordable housing, subsidized housing for people with a low income
- Condemned property, housing with restrictions placed by the local authority due to poor safety or public health
- Slum, a highly populated urban residential area often associated with poverty
