= Board of Condemnation =

A Board of Condemnation or Condemnation Board is an American local government body associated with condemning structures and accessory structures (such as sheds).

The town of Fairfield, Connecticut has a Board of Condemnation which consists of 3 persons while the City of Washington, D.C. has a Board of 9 members.
