= Thomas Rainey =

American inventor (1824–1910)

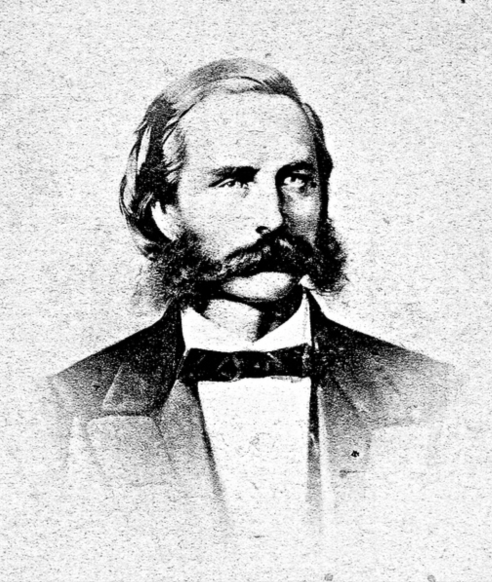
- Born: December 9, 1824; Yanceyville, North Carolina, U.S.
- Died: March 29, 1910 (aged 85); New York City, U.S.
- Monuments: Rainey Park, Astoria, New York
- Occupations: Professor, Engineer, Navigator, Engineer, Author
- Known for: Advocation for the Queensboro Bridge
- Notable work: Rainey’s Improved Abacus; Ocean Steam Navigation and The Ocean Post
- Political party: Whig

Thomas Rainey (1824–1910) was an American lecturer, inventor, entrepreneur, and civic promoter best known for his decades-long campaign to construct a bridge across the East River between Manhattan and Long Island City: what would eventually become the Queensboro Bridge. He is remembered as "The Father of the Bridge" for dedicating 25 years and his entire fortune to this cause.

== Early life and career ==
Born in Yanceyville, North Carolina, Rainey was the eldest of fifteen children. After leaving home as a young man, he worked his way west through multiple states, teaching and studying various subjects, including arithmetic and medicine. He published Rainey’s Improved Abacus in 1849, a treatise on arithmetic and mensuration intended to make mathematical methods more accessible.

He later became active as a lecturer and editor, founding several journals such as The Ohio Teacher, The Western Review, and The Cincinnati Daily Republican. Rainey developed relationships with prominent scientific and political figures of his day, including Louis Agassiz and Daniel Webster.

== Steam navigation ==
During his travels to South America and Europe, Rainey studied steam navigation and subsequently gained a concession to build and operate a fleet of steam ferries in the Bay of Rio de Janeiro, Brazil. He prospered in this venture from 1860 to 1874, building sixteen new vessels and accumulating a considerable fortune.

== Advocacy for Queensboro Bridge ==
Rainey returned to New York and settled in Ravenswood, in what is now Queens, where he committed himself to advocating for a bridge across the East River, spending his fortune and considerable energy in the effort. He repeatedly lobbied political leaders in Albany and Washington, D.C., and proposed a cantilever bridge near the site where the Queensboro Bridge now stands. Although unable to secure the construction of the bridge in his lifetime, Rainey’s relentless promotion laid critical groundwork for the eventual realization of the project. When the bridge opened in 1909, he was honored as its symbolic “father,” receiving a gold medal and a commemorative tablet.

== Work on repatriation efforts ==
Rainey also served as a U.S. agent in the mid-19th century, playing a key role in efforts to repatriate Africans rescued from slave ships. Notably, he accompanied survivors of the ship Echo to Liberia, leveraging his Portuguese language skills learned in Brazil to serve as an interpreter and facilitator in sensitive diplomatic missions.

== Publications ==
- Rainey's Improved Abacus: An Explanatory Treatise on the Theory and Practice of Arithmetic and Mensuration (1849)
- Ocean Steam Navigation and the Ocean Post (1858)

== Memorial ==
Rainey Park, located on Vernon Boulevard in Astoria, Queens, commemorates his vision for a bridge linking Manhattan and Queens. The park lies near the bridge site and honors his contributions to the city’s infrastructure and community development.

== Personal life ==
Rainey was married to Grace Priscilla Ogden, who died in 1909. They had no children. Rainey died in New York City in 1910 at the age of 85.
