= Commendation =

Commendation ceremony was a formal ceremony that evolved during the early medieval period to create a bond between a lord and his fighting man.

Commendation may also refer to:

- the placing of an ecclesiastical benefice in commendam
- Ulmus 'Morton Stalwart' Commendation, a Morton Arboretum hybrid cultivar
- Commander-in-Chief Unit Commendation, a Canadian award given to military units
- Commendation Medal, a mid-level United States military decoration
- Commendation for Gallantry, a military decoration awarded to personnel of the Australian Defence Force
- King's Commendation, a South African award for valuable services in connection with the Second World War
- Meritorious Team Commendation, a unit award of the United States Coast Guard
- Meritorious Unit Commendation, a mid-level unit award of the United States Armed Forces
- Navy Unit Commendation, a United States Navy unit award

Official Commendation awards of the United Kingdom consist of:

- King's and Queen's Commendation for Brave Conduct, awarded 1939–1994
- King's and Queen's Commendation for Valuable Service in the Air, awarded 1942–1994
- Queen's Commendation for Bravery, awarded since 1994
- Queen's Commendation for Bravery in the Air, awarded since 1994
- Queen's Commendation for Valuable Service, awarded since 1994

== See also ==
- Condemnation (disambiguation)
