= Queensboro Bridge =

Cantilever bridge in New York City

- View from Roosevelt Island toward Queens, 2024
- Coordinates: 40°45′25″N 73°57′17″W
- Carries: 8 lanes (4 upper, 4 lower) of NY 25; 2 elevated railway tracks (until 1942); 6 streetcar tracks (until 1957); 1 lane for pedestrians; 1 lane for bicycles
- Crosses: East River
- Locale: New York City (Manhattan–Queens)
- Official name: Ed Koch Queensboro Bridge
- Other name(s): 59th Street Bridge; Queensboro; Blackwell Island Bridge
- Maintained by: New York City Department of Transportation
- ID number: 2240048

Characteristics
- Design: Double-decked cantilever bridge
- Total length: 7,449 ft (2,270 m)
- Width: 100 ft (30 m)
- Height: 350 ft (110 m)
- Longest span: 1,182 ft (360 m) (west span)
- No. of spans: 5
- Clearance above: 12 feet (3.7 m) (upper level)
- Clearance below: 130 ft (40 m)

History
- Architect: Henry Hornbostel
- Designer: Gustav Lindenthal
- Engineering design by: R. S. Buck
- Opened: March 30, 1909; 117 years ago

Statistics
- Daily traffic: 160,111 (2019)
- Toll: Free (upper-level northern roadway and Queens-bound traffic); Variable congestion charge (Manhattan-bound traffic on all other roadways)
- Queensboro Bridge
- U.S. National Register of Historic Places
- New York State Register of Historic Places
- New York City Landmark
- Architectural style: Beaux-Arts; through cantilever truss
- NRHP reference No.: 78001879
- NYSRHP No.: 06101.000495
- NYCL No.: 0828

Significant dates
- Added to NRHP: December 20, 1978
- Designated NYSRHP: June 23, 1980
- Designated NYCL: April 16, 1974

Location
- Interactive map of Queensboro Bridge

The Queensboro, officially the Ed Koch Queensboro Bridge, but known by locals by one of two other names depending on the side, is a cantilever bridge over the East River in New York City. Completed in 1909, it connects the Long Island City neighborhood in the borough of Queens with the East Midtown and Upper East Side neighborhoods in Manhattan, passing over Roosevelt Island. Because the western end of the bridge connects to 59th Street in Manhattan, it is also called the 59th Street Bridge by Manhattanites. The bridge consists of five steel spans measuring 3,725 ft (1,135 m) long; including approaches, its total length is 7,449 ft (2,270 m).

The Queensboro Bridge carries New York State Route 25 (NY 25), which terminates at the bridge's western end in Manhattan. The bridge has two levels: an upper level with a pair of two-lane roadways, and a lower level with four vehicular lanes flanked by a walkway and a bike lane. The western leg of the Queensboro Bridge is paralleled on its northern side by the Roosevelt Island Tramway. The bridge is one of four vehicular bridges directly connecting Manhattan Island and Long Island, along with the Williamsburg, Manhattan, and Brooklyn bridges to the south. It lies along the courses of the New York City Marathon and the Five Boro Bike Tour.

Serious proposals for a bridge linking Manhattan to Long Island City were first made as early as 1838, but various 19th-century plans to erect such a bridge, including two proposals by Queens doctor Thomas Rainey, never came to fruition. After the creation of the City of Greater New York in 1898, plans for a city-operated bridge were finalized in 1901. The bridge opened for public use on March 30, 1909, and was initially used by pedestrians, horse-drawn and motor vehicles, elevated trains, and trolleys. Elevated service ceased in 1942, followed by trolley service in 1957. The upper-level roadways were built in the early 1930s and the late 1950s. Designated as a New York City landmark in 1973, the bridge was renovated extensively from the late 1970s to the 1990s. The bridge was officially renamed in 2011 in honor of former New York City mayor Ed Koch, and another renovation occurred in the early 2020s.

== Name ==
The Queensboro Bridge was originally named for the borough of Queens and was the third bridge across the East River to be named after a New York City borough, after the Brooklyn Bridge and the Manhattan Bridge. By the late 20th century, the Queensboro Bridge was also known as the 59th Street Bridge because its Manhattan end is located between 59th and 60th streets. This name caused controversy among Queens residents who felt that the 59th Street Bridge name did not honor the borough of Queens.

In December 2010, mayor Michael Bloomberg announced that the bridge would be renamed in honor of former mayor Ed Koch; the bridge had been renovated extensively in the 1980s, when he was mayor. The Ed Koch Queensboro Bridge name was formalized on March 23, 2011. The renaming was unpopular among Queens residents and business leaders; The Los Angeles Times wrote that Queens residents found the renaming disrespectful to their borough. The general public continued to call it the Queensboro Bridge years after the renaming. New York City Council member Peter Vallone Jr. of Queens proposed removing Koch's name from the bridge in 2013. and Mayor Zohran Mamdani has also suggested removing Koch's name from the bridge title.

== Description ==
The Queensboro Bridge is a two-level double cantilever bridge, with separate cantilevered spans over channels on each side of Roosevelt Island joined by a fixed central truss. In all, it has five steel truss spans, as well as approach viaducts on either side. The total length of the five spans, between the anchorages on the Manhattan and Queens sides, are approximately 3,725 ft (1,135 m), of which 2,166 feet (660 m) are above water. In addition, there is a 1,052-foot-long (321 m) approach viaduct in Manhattan and a 2,588-foot-long (789 m) approach viaduct in Queens, connecting the anchorages on either side to street level. This brings the bridge's total length to 7,449 feet (2,270 m). (Note: Various sources from 1907 and 1908, before the bridge's completion, cited the Queens approach as 3,455 feet (1,053 m) and the whole bridge as 8,231 feet (2,509 m) long. They described the Manhattan approach as being 1,051 feet. A Scientific American article from 1908 gives a figure of 7,408 feet (2,258 m) for the whole bridge.) The bridge carries New York State Route 25, which ends at the span's western terminus.

=== Spans ===
The lengths of the steel spans are as follows, from the westernmost span to the easternmost:

Spans of the Queensboro Bridge
West end	East end	Crosses	Length
Manhattan anchorage	Manhattan pier	York Avenue	469.5 ft (143.1 m)
Manhattan pier	Roosevelt Island western pier	East River's west channel, FDR Drive	1,182 ft (360 m)
Roosevelt Island western pier	Roosevelt Island eastern pier	Roosevelt Island	630 ft (190 m)
Roosevelt Island eastern pier	Queens pier	East River's east channel	984 ft (300 m)
Queens pier	Queens anchorage	Vernon Boulevard	459 ft (140 m)

The bridge was intended to carry a dead load of 32,200 pounds per foot (47,900 kg/m). Each span includes two parallel lines of trusses, one each on the north and south sides of the bridge; the centers of these trusses are spaced 60 feet (18 m) apart. The bottom chord of each set of trusses is composed of box girders, while the top chord is composed of eyebars measuring 8 to 12 inches (200 to 300 mm) deep. The trusses range in height from 45 to 118 feet (14 to 36 m) between the bottom and top chords; the steel towers atop each pier measure 185 feet (56 m) tall. Unlike other large bridges, the trusses are not suspended; instead, the spans are directly connected to each other. In addition, there are transverse floor beams, which protrude 13 feet (4.0 m) from the trusses on either side of the deck. Atop the bridge's topmost chords were originally galvanized steel ropes, which acted as handrails for bridge painters. Five hand-operated scaffolds were also placed on the bridge.

The spans are cantilevered from steel towers that rise above four central piers. Each cantilevered section measures 808 to 1,061 feet (246 to 323 m) long. The two spans above the East River's channels are composed of cantilever arms, which extend outward from the towers on either side of the channel. Each pair of cantilever arms meets at a set of bents above the middle of each channel. The bents allowed the cantilever arms to move horizontally due to temperature changes, and it allowed structural loads to be distributed between the two arms. The bridge uses nickel-steel bars that were intended to be 40 to 50 percent stronger than regular structural-steel bars of the same weight. The beams could withstand loads of up to 56,000 pounds (25,000 kg) each, while the nickel-steel eyebars were intended to withstand loads of up to 85,000 pounds (39,000 kg). The decks themselves were designed to carry as much as 16,000 pounds per foot (24,000 kg/m).

The steel spans between the anchorages weigh a total of 52,000 short tons (46,000 long tons; 47,000 t) and have a maximum grade of 3.41 percent. The spans were intended to be at least 118 feet (36 m) above mean high water; the bridge reaches a maximum height of 135 feet (41 m) or 140 feet (43 m) above high mean water. Until it was surpassed by the Quebec Bridge in 1917, the span between Manhattan and Roosevelt Island was the longest cantilever in North America; it was also the second-longest worldwide, after the Forth Bridge in Scotland.

==== Levels ====
The upper level is 67 feet (20 m) wide. The upper level originally contained two pedestrian walkways and two elevated railway tracks, which connected a spur of the IRT Second Avenue elevated line in Manhattan to the Queensboro Plaza station in Queens. There were also provisions for two additional tracks between the trusses (taking up the space occupied by the walkways), as well as 13-foot-wide (4.0 m) walkways cantilevered outside the trusses. As of 2023, the upper level has four lanes of automobile traffic, consisting of a pair of two-lane roadways. Although both roadways end at Thomson Avenue in Queens, they diverge in Manhattan. The two northern lanes, normally used by westbound traffic, lead to 62nd and 63rd Streets. The two southern lanes, normally used by eastbound traffic, lead to 57th and 58th Streets. The southern roadway is used as a westbound high-occupancy vehicle lane during morning rush hours, when all eastbound traffic uses the lower level.

The lower level is 86 feet (26 m) wide and is divided into three sections: a northern, central, and southern roadway. The center roadway is 56 feet (17 m) wide and was originally composed of a 36-foot-wide (11 m) general-purpose road in the middle, flanked by a pair of trolley tracks. The northern and southern lower-level roadways each had one additional trolley track, for a total of four trolley tracks. The central roadway originally had a wood block pavement. As of 2025, the lower level has four vehicular lanes: two in each direction within the center roadway. The northern lower-level roadway was converted into a permanent pedestrian walk and bicycle path in September 2000; pedestrians were relocated to the southern lower-level roadway in 2025.

==== Piers ====
The five spans are supported by six piers; the westernmost and easternmost piers act as anchorages. Each of the piers consists of two columns supported by an elliptical arch measuring 50 feet (15 m) wide. The piers each measure 130 by 40 feet (40 by 12 m) across at their bases (including the arched openings). They range from 100 to 125 feet (30 to 38 m) tall, with the piers on Roosevelt Island being the tallest. The foundations of the Roosevelt Island piers are shallow, since there is bedrock just below the surface of the island. By comparison, the piers in Manhattan and Queens extend over 50 feet (15 m) deep.

The piers are faced with Maine granite and are attached to a backing made of concrete and Mohawk Valley limestone. In total, workers used 14,000 cubic yards (11,000 m^{3}) of limestone, 17,000 cubic yards (13,000 m^{3}) of concrete, and 22,800 cubic yards (17,400 m^{3}) of granite to build the bridges. Above the piers rise the bridge's towers, which contain domed decorations and Art Nouveau-inspired spires. The towers extend 185 feet (56 m) above the bridge's lower chords. The tops of the towers are made of 225 granite blocks, which were part of the original design but not added until 1937. The spires were removed at some point in the 20th century after deteriorating.

The two anchorages, one each at the Manhattan and Queens ends, are about 500 feet (150 m) inland of the shore. Each anchorage was built with spiral staircases and elevators. The anchorage in Manhattan is between First Avenue and York Avenue, while the Queens anchorage is near Vernon Boulevard. The anchorages are topped by small rooms with arched openings.

=== Approaches ===
==== Manhattan approach ====
The approaches on both sides of the bridge are composed of stiffened steel frames, but the Manhattan approach is the only one that is ornately decorated. The Manhattan approach is supported on a series of Guastavino tile vaults. The vaults are composed of three layers of tiles, which support themselves and measure 4 inches (100 mm) thick in total. A layer of glazing and small lights were installed in 1918. The space under the Manhattan approach measures 120 by 270 feet (37 by 82 m) across. It is divided into a series of tiled vaults measuring 30 by 30 feet (9.1 by 9.1 m) across. As the bridge ascends to the east, the floor slopes down and the ceiling slopes up; as such, the ceiling measures 60 feet (18 m) high at its highest point. The Guastavino tiles cover the steel superstructure of the approach ramp.

Originally, the vaults were intended as storage space. From the bridge's 1909 opening, the space under the Manhattan approach was used as a food market. The food market was renovated in 1933 and was later converted to a sign shop and garage. By the 1970s, the space under the Manhattan approach was used by the Department of Highways. New York City Center's Cinematheque leased space under the Queensboro Bridge in 1973, although the Cinematheque never opened due to a lack of money. A developer proposed the open-air Bridgemarket under the bridge in 1976, which local residents significantly opposed, and Bridgemarket was not approved until 1996. Bridgemarket, covering 98,000 square feet (9,100 m^{2}), opened in 1999 at a cost of $24 million. (Note: About $44 million in 2025 (Note: Johnston, Louis; Williamson, Samuel H. (2023). "What Was the U.S. GDP Then?". MeasuringWorth. United States Gross Domestic Product deflator figures follow the MeasuringWorth series.)) The store operated until the end of 2015. In February 2020, it was announced that Trader Joe's was planning to open a supermarket in this space, which opened in December 2021.

There is a massive bronze lamppost at the end of the Manhattan approach, near the intersection of Second Avenue and 59th Street. Formerly, there was a second lamppost near 60th Street. Both lampposts consisted of thick piers, which were topped by four stanchions (each with a globe-shaped lamp) and a larger spherical lamp in the center. Each lamppost had five tiers of decorations, and the sides of each lamppost were inscribed with the names of four of the city's five boroughs. The lampposts were both removed in 1974 when the Roosevelt Island Tramway was developed, but the 59th Street lamppost was restored two years later. Parts of the other lamppost were found in a Queens warehouse in 2012 and rededicated on Roosevelt Island in 2015.

==== Queens approach ====
The Queens approach consists of a series of elevated concrete-and-steel ramps, which were never formally decorated. The LIC Ramps, a public park under one of the approach ramps, was announced in late 2024 and began construction in June 2025. Another 370,000 square feet (34,000 m^{2}) of open space under the bridge, spread across 15 land lots, was proposed for conversion into parkland in 2025. These spaces include Baby Park, near the waterfront, which was closed in the 1980s.

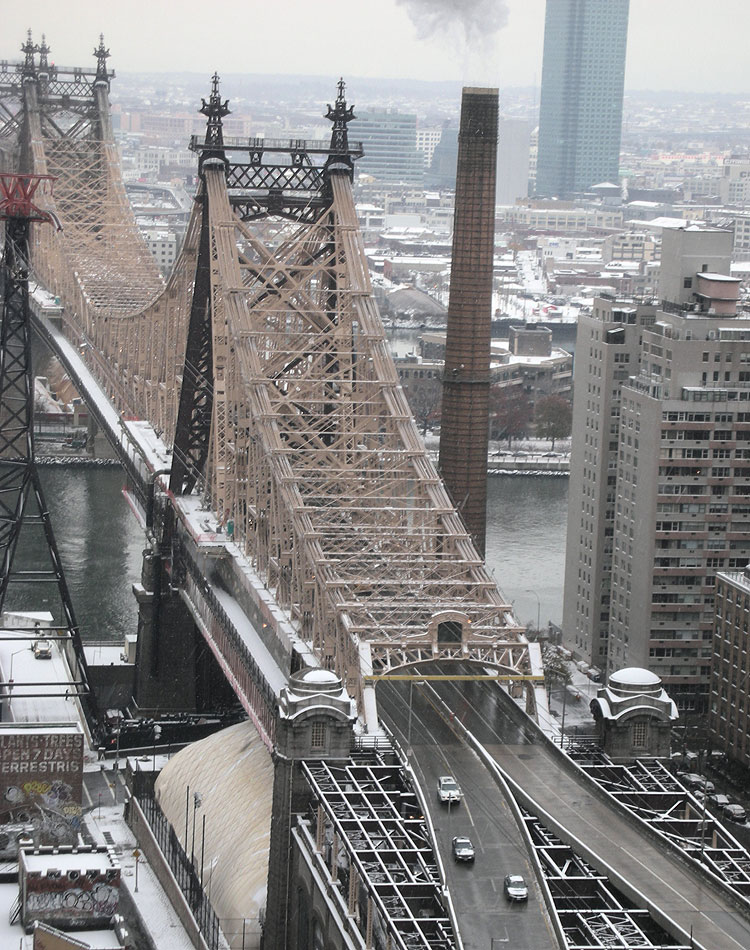
Looking east from Manhattan toward Queens

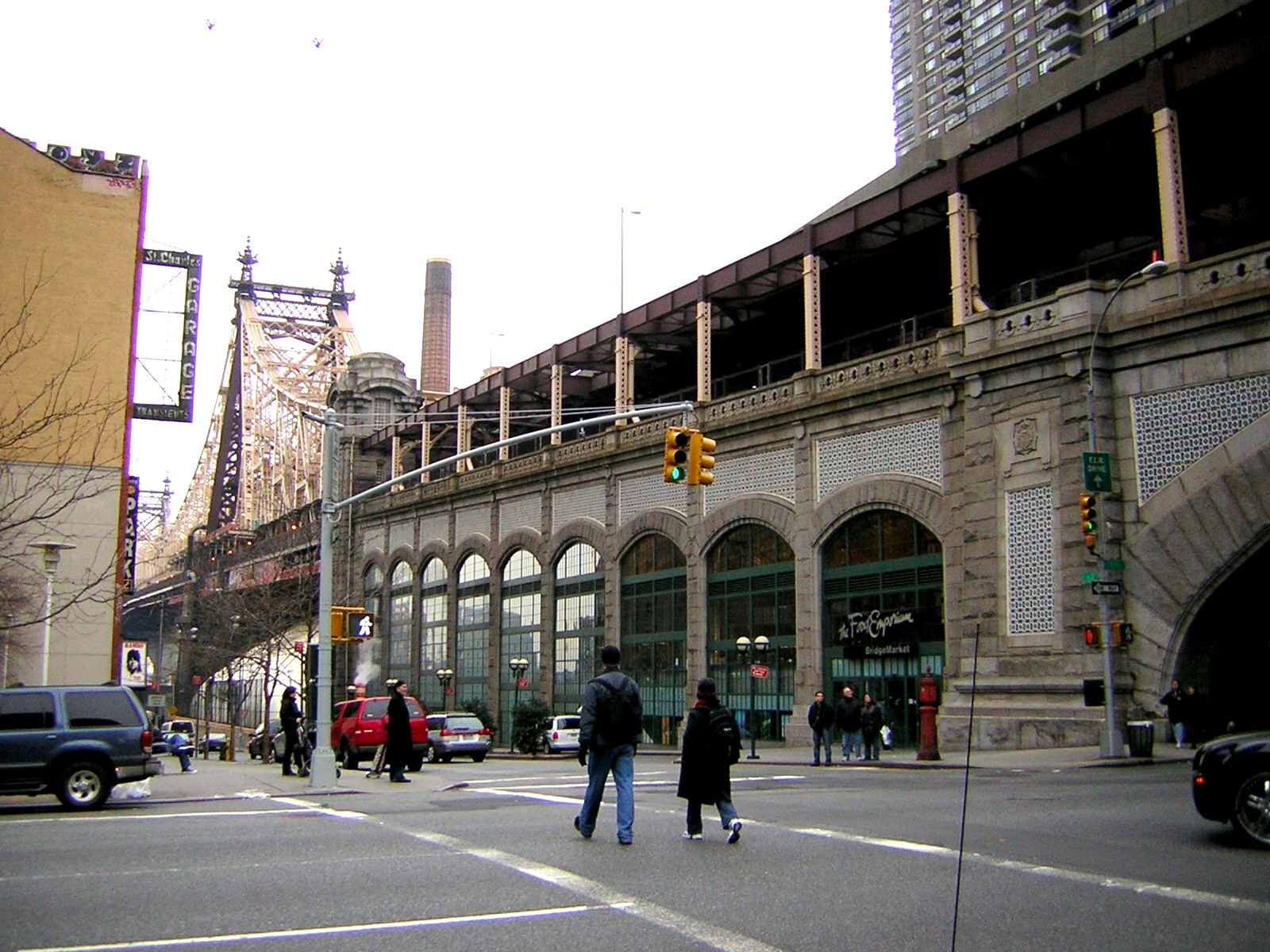
Bridgemarket on Manhattan side

=== Use during races ===
The Queensboro Bridge has been part of the New York City Marathon course since 1976, when the marathon course traversed all five boroughs for the first time. During the marathon, which happens every November, runners cross the Queensboro Bridge westbound toward Manhattan, then pass under the bridge at First Avenue. The bridge is approximately 15 miles (24 km) from the beginning of the course on the Verrazzano–Narrows Bridge. The deck of the bridge was initially covered with carpeting for the 1976 marathon; the carpeting was not used after 1977, when the bridge was repaved. The bridge is also part of the course of the Five Boro Bike Tour, which occurs every April; contestants traverse the bridge eastbound toward Queens. As of 2022, the Five Boro Bike Tour uses the northern upper-level roadway.

== Development ==
=== Planning ===
Prior to the construction of the Queensboro Bridge, two ferries connected modern-day Manhattan and Queens, neither of which were near the modern-day bridge. One such ferry connected Borden Avenue in Hunters Point, Queens, to 34th Street in Kips Bay, Manhattan, while the other ferry connected Astoria Boulevard in Astoria, Queens, with 92nd Street on Manhattan's Upper East Side. Benjamin Henry Latrobe first proposed a masonry bridge between Manhattan and Queens in 1804. The Family Magazine published an article in 1833, suggesting a bridge between Manhattan and Queens over Roosevelt Island (which then was known as Blackwell's Island). An architect named R. Graves proposed a three-span suspension bridge linking Manhattan to Long Island City, Queens, in the late 1830s. John A. Roebling, who would later design the Brooklyn Bridge, proposed suspension bridges at the site in 1847 and 1856.

==== Rainey attempts ====
An attempt to finance a fixed East River crossing was made in 1867 by wealthy Long Island City residents, who established the New-York and Long Island Bridge Company to erect the crossing. This group was led by Thomas Rainey, a doctor from Astoria. The crossing would have connected 77th Street in Manhattan and 34th Avenue in Queens, passing over the center of Blackwell's Island. The New-York and Long Island Bridge Company appointed commissioners for the proposed bridge in 1875 and hosted an architectural design competition for the bridge in 1876. A cantilever design by Charles Macdonald and the Delaware Bridge Company was selected in early 1877, but no action had been taken by 1878, a year after the plans were approved. Media sources reported in May 1881 that work was to commence shortly, and a cofferdam for one of the bridge's piers was installed that month. By the time the United States Congress approved plans for the bridge in 1887, Rainey's bridge had been relocated southward. A state justice found in 1890 that the bridge's charter was invalid. Nonetheless, Rainey's efforts to build the bridge made his name "a household word in western Long Island".

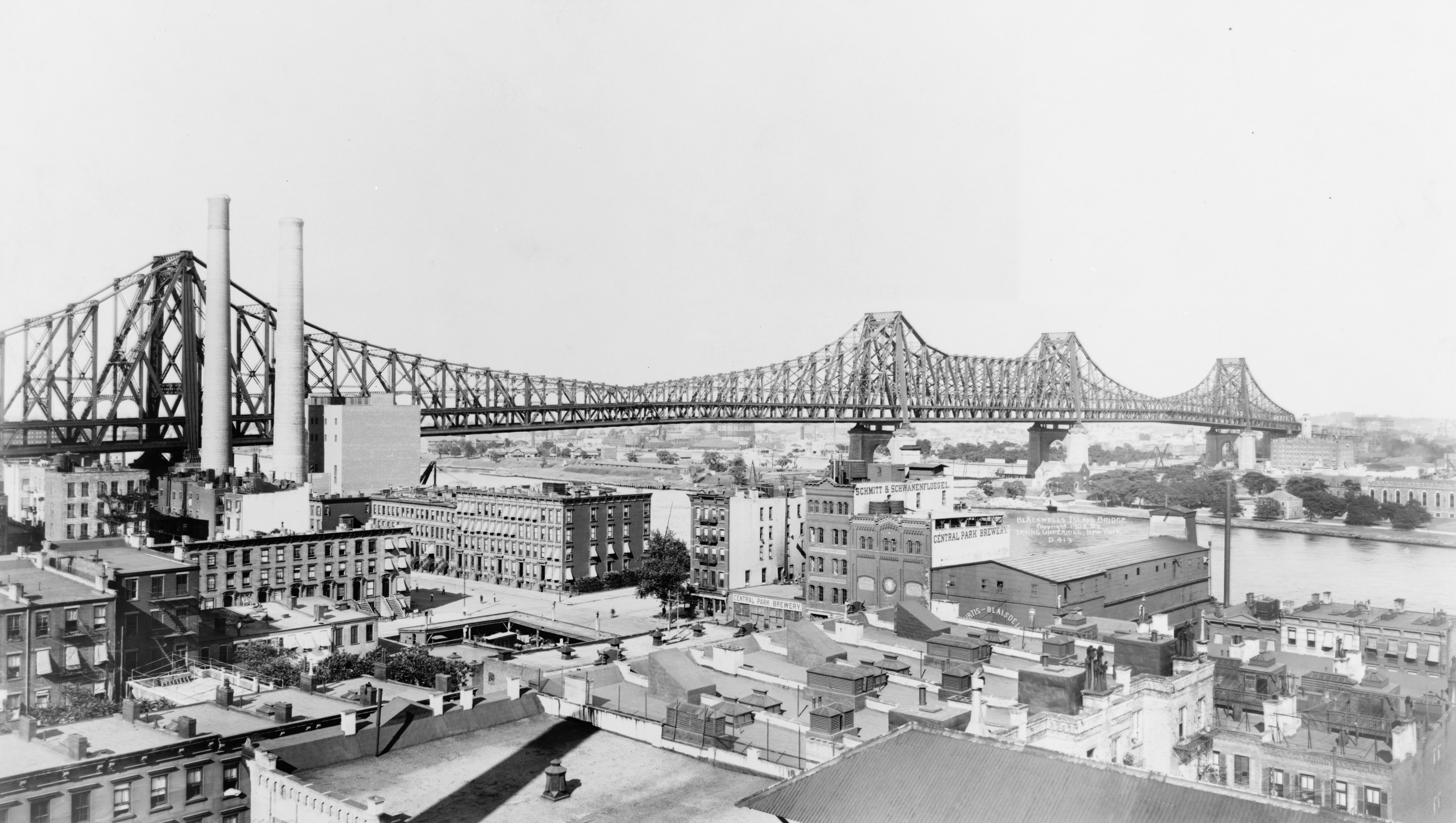
Bridge seen from Manhattan, c. 1908

By the 1890s, Long Island Rail Road (LIRR) president Austin Corbin had merged Rainey's plan and a competing plan. Rainey resubmitted plans for the bridge in early 1890. The state legislature gave Rainey a charter for the Blackwell's Island Bridge in mid-1892. Corbin received an option to buy out Rainey's charter, and a groundbreaking ceremony for the bridge was held at 64th Street in Manhattan on August 19, 1894. The span was planned as a cantilever bridge carrying four LIRR tracks, as well as roadways and footpaths. By that November, two cofferdams were being sunk for the bridge's piers. Laborers began constructing foundations for another pier on the eastern shore of Blackwell Island in April 1895. Stone and steel contracts had been awarded by the following year, and two of the piers had been built above the water line. Construction was halted after the piers were built, first due to lawsuits, then because of Corbin's death.

==== Post-unification approval ====
Manhattan and Queens were merged into the City of Greater New York in 1898, spurring alternate plans for a bridge between Manhattan and Queens. New York Assembly members proposed separate bills in early 1898 to revoke Rainey's franchise for the bridge and to have the city purchase Rainey's franchise. Rainey vowed not to sell his franchise, but the state legislature passed a bill in March 1900 allowing the city to take over Rainey's franchise. Although Rainey himself eventually consented to the city's takeover of his franchise, mayor Robert Anderson Van Wyck wanted to build a new bridge in a slightly different location.

A New York state senator introduced legislation in early 1897 to permit the development of a bridge between Manhattan and Queens; the unified city government was to pay for the bridge. At a meeting in Long Island City in February 1898, a group of men from both boroughs were appointed to consider plans for the bridge. By late 1898, Queens residents were threatening to not vote for the Democratic Party (of which Van Wyck was part) if the construction of the bridge did not begin shortly. The city allocated $100,000 (Note: About $3,299,000 in 2025) for preliminary surveys and borings for the Blackwell's Island Bridge, as well as the Williamsburg Bridge between Manhattan and Brooklyn, at the end of 1898.

In early 1899, R. S. Buck published plans for an asymmetrical cantilever bridge connecting Queens with Manhattan; the early plans called for a utilitarian design. The New York City Bridge Department's chief engineer finalized plans for the bridge in October 1899. Coler drew up a plan for a tunnel between Queens and Manhattan via Blackwell's Island; he claimed that the tunnel would cost $1.9 million, while the bridge would cost $13 million. (Note: The tunnel plan would be equal to about $62 million, and the bridge plan equal to $424 million, in 2025) The Board of Aldermen appropriated $1 million (Note: About $33 million in 2025) for the bridge at the end of 1899. State assemblyman Edward C. Brennan proposed a bill in January 1900 to appoint commissioners for a bridge or tunnel between Manhattan and Queens. The city's Municipal Assembly initially failed to authorize the bridge's construction due to opposition from Tammany Hall politicians. The bridge was approved that November; the bridge was relocated southward so its Manhattan end was near 60th Street. The United States Department of War, which had to certify the plans for the bridge before any work could begin, approved the span's construction in February 1901. Initially, the crossing was referred to as East River Bridge No. 4; the Board of Aldermen voted to officially rename it the Blackwell's Island Bridge in March 1902.

=== Construction ===
==== Pier construction and proposed modifications ====
R. S. Buck and his assistants were directed to prepare plans for the sites of the bridge's piers, anchorages, and foundations. The Department of Bridges received bids for the foundations in June 1901, with Ryan & Parker as the low bidder. Groundbreaking took place that September. After Seth Low was elected as the city's mayor in late 1901, he promised that work would continue, even though the city's new bridge commissioner, Gustav Lindenthal, wanted to temporarily halt construction. Lindenthal narrowed the bridge from 120 to 80 feet (37 to 24 m). The modifications would allow the city to save $850,000 (Note: About $26 million in 2025) while allowing the city to build toll booths, as well as stairs and elevators to Blackwell's Island, within these piers. To compensate for the reduced width, a 45-foot-wide (14 m) upper deck would be built. By January 1902, only $42,000 had been spent on the project. (Note: About $1,353,000 in 2025)

In June 1902, a subcommittee of the New York City Board of Estimate requested another $5 million for construction. (Note: About $150 million in 2025) The same month, Lindenthal ordered Ryan & Parker to stop working on the bridge, but the firm refused to comply with his order, saying they would lose large amounts of money if work were halted. Lindenthal submitted the modified plans to the Municipal Art Society for approval but withdrew them that July, and he also allowed Ryan & Parker to continue constructing the piers. Lindenthal decided to significantly modify his plans. Queens residents strongly protested any design changes, and Lindenthal finally agreed not to change the bridge's width. By mid-1902, Lindenthal was requesting an additional $3.78 million for the bridge's completion. (Note: About $114 million in 2025) In October, a special committee recommended that Lindenthal's plans be rejected, saying that it would cost the city more if construction were halted and that two other East River bridges were also about 120 feet wide. City comptroller Edward M. Grout, meanwhile, wanted workers to divert their efforts to the Manhattan Bridge.

Low appointed a group of engineering experts that November to review Lindenthal's revised plans. The experts concluded that neither the original proposal nor Lindenthal's revision were sufficient and suggested that the bridge instead be 91 feet (28 m) wide. The approaches retained their original 120-foot width, as did the piers themselves. Henry Hornbostel was directed in early 1903 to prepare drawings of the bridge's towers and roadway, though no architectural contract had been awarded yet. By mid-1903, the piers were two-thirds completed. The bedrock under the Queens side of the bridge was very close to the ground, so work on the piers in Queens was able to proceed more rapidly than work on the other piers. The Board of Estimate appropriated an additional $3.86 million for the bridge's construction in July 1903. (Note: About $111 million in 2025) Low rejected a plan for widening 59th Street to serve as the bridge's Manhattan approach, and Queens residents disagreed over plans for the Queens approach. The final plans called for the Queens approach to end at Crescent Street; a new boulevard, Queens Plaza, would connect the approach to Jackson Avenue and Queens Boulevard. All of the piers were finished by May 1904, and city officials inspected the bridge's piers that July.

==== Initial work on superstructure ====
The Pennsylvania Steel Company submitted a bid to construct the bridge's superstructure for $5.3 million in September 1903; (Note: About $152 million in 2025) Lindenthal rejected the bid, suspecting that the company was engaging in collusion. The city requested further bids for the superstructure the next month, but an injunction prevented Lindenthal from awarding a steel contract. The Pennsylvania Steel Company received the steel contract that November, and the Art Commission approved plans for the bridge's spires the same month. Just before Lindenthal left office, the city received bids for four elevator towers and two powerhouses for the bridge at the end of 1903; the powerhouses were to supply the elevators. These elevators were to be positioned within the ends of the piers, which would make it impossible to widen the piers at a later date. City corrections commissioner Francis J. Lantry opposed the elevators because they would allow prisoners on Blackwell's Island to escape. In early 1904, Lindenthal's successor George Best canceled plans for ornamentation on the bridge.

The Pennsylvania Steel Company was obligated to complete the superstructure by the beginning of 1907, and it submitted drawings for the construction of the superstructure in mid-1904. Later that year, Best postponed construction of the bridge's elevators and power houses, and the city authorized another $400,000 for the bridge's construction. (Note: About $11 million in 2025) Local merchants protested the postponement of the elevators, saying it would not save money. Before work on the superstructure began, workers erected seventeen temporary 135-foot-tall (41 m) bents between the two piers on Blackwell's Island. When the bents were almost complete, ironworkers organized a sympathetic strike in June 1905, in solidarity with striking workers at the Pennsylvania Steel Company's Harrisburg factory. The work stoppage lasted a month, during which workers were not allowed to complete steel castings for the bridge. By that August, over 6,000 short tons (5,400 long tons; 5,400 t) of steel castings had been completed, and another 20,000 short tons (18,000 long tons; 18,000 t) of castings were being fabricated. There was not enough material to begin constructing the superstructure. There were so few workers on site, a local group estimated that the bridge would not be completed for fifty years.

Work on the superstructure began later in 1905. By that November, workers had erected part of a steel tower atop the pier on the western side of Blackwell's Island; at the time, the media anticipated that 3,000 short tons (2,700 long tons; 2,700 t) of steel would be erected every month. The first steel span, that above Blackwell's Island, was completed at the beginning of 1906. After the Blackwell's Island span was finished, the falsework was moved to Manhattan and Queens, and the westernmost and easternmost spans were built atop the falsework. At that point, the city government had acquired much of the land for the approaches. The bridge's construction was delayed when the Housesmiths' Union went on strike that January. Unions representing other trades refused to join the strike, and the Pennsylvania Steel Company had replaced the striking workers by that May. The strike delayed construction by four months. City officials condemned a 250-foot-wide (76 m) strip of land for the Queens approach viaduct in October 1906.

==== Progress on superstructure and approaches ====
The city's Bridge Commission received bids for the construction of a steel approach viaduct in Queens in December 1906, and the Buckley Realty Construction Company submitted a low bid of $798,000. (Note: About $21 million in 2025) Work on the Queens approach began in February 1907. By then, about 45,000 short tons (40,000 long tons; 41,000 t) of steel for the bridge, representing nine-tenths of the steel contract, had been manufactured. Workers erected 512 tons of steel each day. To erect the two spans across the East River's west and east channels, they first built steel towers above each pier, then constructed the cantilever arms from each tower toward the center of the river. As such, the bridge was essentially built in three sections in Manhattan, Blackwell's Island, and Queens. By early 1907, the cost of acquiring land for the approaches had increased to $6 million, double the original estimate, and the cost of the entire bridge had increased to as much as $18 million. (Note: The approaches would be equal to about $151 million, and the entire bridge equal to $453 million, in 2025) Snare & Triest submitted a low bid of $1.577 million for the construction of the Manhattan approach that May, (Note: About $40 million in 2025) and work on that approach began that July.

After the collapse of the similarly designed Quebec Bridge in mid-1907, engineers said they had no concerns about the Blackwell's Island Bridge. The steel towers above both of the Blackwell's Island piers had been completed and were being painted. That September, some beams at the eastern end of the bridge were blown into the river during a heavy windstorm. The same month, Maryland Steel Company submitted a low bid of $758,000 for a steel-and-masonry approach in Queens. (Note: About $19 million in 2025) Several buildings in Long Island City, including rowhouses and an old homestead, were demolished for the Queens approach. The easternmost steel span was well underway by the end of 1907, and work on the steel towers on the Manhattan and Queens waterfronts began that December. At the time, the bridge was more than 70 percent complete. Although Manhattan residents supported widening 59th Street to serve as the bridge's Manhattan approach, the city's controller was opposed. The project continued to experience labor disputes, such as in early 1908, when disgruntled workers tried to destroy the Blackwell's Island span with dynamite.

==== Completion ====
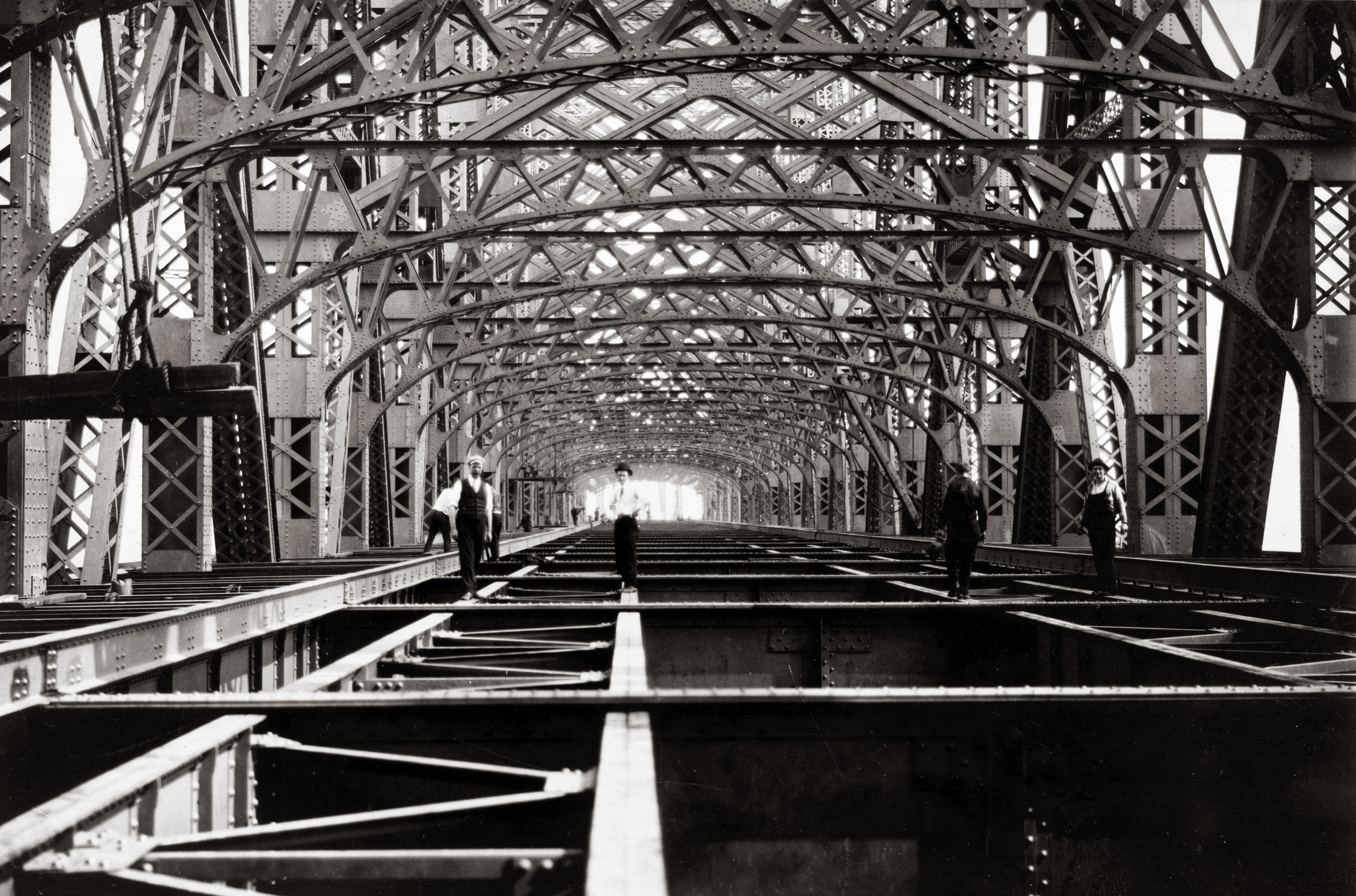
Constructing the upper level in 1907

The Manhattan and Blackwell's Island sections of the bridge were riveted together on March 13, 1908, and the Blackwell's Island and Queens sections were linked on March 18. The Board of Aldermen appropriated another $1.2 million for the bridge's completion shortly afterward; the project had cost $6.2 million up to that point. (Note: The additional funding is equal to about $30 million, and the total cost equal to $156 million, in 2025) The New York City Department of Finance's chief engineer began investigating the bridge in May 1908 in response to concerns over its structural integrity, as the bridge was similar to the collapsed Quebec Bridge, and the plans had been modified after the contract for the superstructure had been awarded. That June, the Board of Estimate authorized $30,000 for two investigations into the bridge's safety. (Note: About $757,000 in 2025) The Pennsylvania Steel Company formally completed the superstructure on June 16, 1908, eighteen months behind schedule. The Department of Bridges began receiving bids that July for paving and electrical equipment, and the approach viaducts were completed on August 17. The city refused to pay Pennsylvania Steel until 1912, when a judge forced them to do so.

Businessmen proposed renaming the crossing as the Queensboro Bridge in September 1908, saying the Blackwell Island name was too closely associated with the island's hospitals and asylums. Despite several Irish-American groups' objections that the Queensboro name resembled a British name, it stuck. The structural engineers tasked with studying the bridge concluded that it was structurally sound, although the bridge was altered to carry two elevated tracks rather than four. There was still skepticism over the bridge's structural integrity, and the Bridge Department planned to remove some heavy stringers from the upper deck to reduce the bridge's dead load. Paving of the bridge's decks was completed in January 1909. In total, the crossing had cost about $20 million, including $12.6 million for spans and over $5 million for land acquisition. (Note: The total cost is equal to about $512 million, the spans' cost is equal to about $322 million, and the land cost is equal to about $128 million in 2025) One newspaper had estimated that 55 workers had been killed during construction.

== Operational history ==
=== Opening and 1910s ===
In February 1909, the Celebration Committee set June 12 as the bridge's official opening date, and two grand parades were planned for the bridge's official opening. The lights on the bridge were first turned on March 28, and the bridge opened to the public two days later on March 30, 1909. The upper deck's tracks were not in service because engineers had deemed them unsafe for use. The Queensboro Bridge formally opened as scheduled on June 12, 1909; at the time, it was the fourth-longest bridge in the world. The grand opening included a fireworks display, a parade lasting several hours, a "Queen of the Queensboro Bridge" beauty pageant in a local newspaper, and a week of carnivals.

During late 1909, the Williams Engineering and Contracting Company sued the city for damages relating to the unbuilt elevators on Blackwell's Island, and there was another lawsuit over its safety. Tolls on the bridge were abolished in 1911. A bridge approach between Second and Third avenues in Manhattan was proposed in 1913, and plans for elevated rapid transit on the upper level were approved at the same time. By that year, the bridge carried 29 million people a year (compared to 3.6 million during 1909). Horse-drawn vehicles made up almost 30 percent of the bridge's total vehicular traffic in the early 1910s, which dropped to less than 2 percent within a decade.

In mid-1914, engineers devised plans to add two subway tracks to the lower level and replace the existing roadway with a pair of 26-foot-wide (7.9 m) roadways on the upper and lower levels. The upper roadway would have connected to Van Alst Avenue (21st Street) in Queens; one company proposed constructing the deck in 18 months. The subway plans were ultimately dropped in favor of the 60th Street Tunnel. In early 1916, the New York City government allocated $144,000 for repairs to the roadway, (Note: About $2,939,000 in 2025) as it had never been repaved and was full of holes and ruts. A new foundation was installed to slow down the decay of the wooden pavement. Simultaneously, the city's Public Service Commission had approved the construction of connections between the bridge's upper-level tracks and the elevated lines at either end. Elevated service across the bridge commenced in July 1917, and the entire repaving project was nearly done later that year.

=== 1920s to 1940s ===
By the early 1920s, one hundred thousand people a day used the span, and the Queensboro Bridge and the other East River bridges were rapidly reaching their vehicular capacity. One count in 1920 found that an estimated 18,000 motor vehicles used the bridge daily, while another count in 1925 found that 45,000 vehicles used the span in 24 hours. Proposals to relieve traffic on the bridge included a ferry from Manhattan to Queens; larger signs pointing to existing ferries; a parallel bridge; and a parallel tunnel (later the Queens–Midtown Tunnel). Traffic on the bridge more than doubled from 1924 to 1932, though the opening of new vehicular crossings caused congestion to increase less rapidly after 1932. By the mid-1930s, the bridge handled an average of 110,000 vehicles daily. When the Queens–Midtown Tunnel opened in 1940, The New York Times predicted it would relieve congestion on the Queensboro Bridge.

==== 1920s modifications and new roadway ====
The Manhattan approach viaduct was repaired in 1920, and city officials began adding a concrete pavement to the bridge in mid-1924. Engineers determined at the time that a hard-surfaced roadway would be too heavy for the bridge. Queens borough president Maurice E. Connolly said the weight of trucks had caused the steel buckle plates under the pavement to break, though the commissioner of the city's Plant and Structure Department said the bridge was still safe and that stronger plates were being installed. In addition, Manhattan borough president Julius Miller proposed a plaza and a new approach road at the Manhattan end in 1924, and he submitted plans to acquire property for the plaza and road later the same year. Miller revised his plans in 1925, calling for a tunnel under Second Avenue and a new street east of the avenue between 57th and 63rd streets. To alleviate congestion, one of the bridge's lanes was used as a reversible lane during peak hours.

In late 1926, Plant and Structure commissioner Albert Goldman proposed adding three vehicular lanes and removing the bridge's footpaths; the proposal also called for new approaches at either end and relocation of the elevated tracks. The Merchants Association and the Fifth Avenue Association endorsed this plan. The Board of Estimate allocated $150,000 for improvements to the bridge in April 1927, (Note: About $2 million in 2025) and the board approved the $3 million plan that June. (Note: About $45 million in 2025) The project was delayed due to difficulties in acquiring property, and the city controller's office contemplated abandoning plans for the new approaches. In late 1928, the Board of Estimate allowed construction to commence on both the new lanes and the approach viaducts at either end. To reduce congestion, the Manhattan ends of the upper and lower roadways were 700 feet (210 m) apart, while the Queens ends of these roadways were about 0.5 miles (0.80 km) apart. Real-estate developers supported the project because it would encourage real-estate and business activity in Queens. Fire extinguishers and chemical carts, for fighting small fires, were also installed on the bridge in 1928.

Goldman publicized his plans for the southern upper roadway in April 1929, and the T. H. Reynolds Company had been hired to move the elevated tracks by the next month. The Bersin Construction Company received a contract for the new roadway in August 1929 and started construction the same month. A contract for the Queens approach viaduct was awarded to Bersin-Ronn Engineering Corporation in April 1930. The upper roadway was substantially completed by early 1931; it opened that June and carried only eastbound cars. By then, the bridge was carrying almost 100,000 vehicles a day. A new footpath was also constructed on the south side of the upper level but was not opened with the upper roadway. Initially, the upper deck had a wood, granite, and asphalt pavement. It contained grooves for motorists' tires, preventing them from changing lanes; after drivers complained about damaged tires, the grooves were first widened, then infilled by September.

==== 1930s and 1940s modifications ====
To reduce congestion, one civic group suggested a plaza at the bridge's Manhattan end in the early 1930s, while Manhattan's borough president Samuel Levy proposed building an underpass to carry traffic on Second Avenue beneath the Manhattan end of the bridge. Precipitation had begun to corrode the bridge's steel supports, as the masonry work had never been completed; this prompted a grand jury investigation into the bridge's safety in 1934. Additionally, in mid-December of that year, the roadway was designated as part of New York State Route 25 and New York State Route 24 when those designations were extended. In 1934, westbound motorists began using the upper southern roadway during weekday mornings, Sundays, and holiday evenings; the upper roadway continued to carry eastbound traffic at all other times. To reduce congestion, traffic agents began controlling traffic at each end of the bridge in July 1935, and lane control lights for the lower level's reversible lanes were installed later the same year.

The bridge's wooden pavement also posed a hazard during rainy weather and made the bridge one of the city's most dangerous roadways by the mid-1930s. This prompted local groups to call for the installation of a non-skid pavement. Workers repaved the upper level in early 1935 and began installing an experimental concrete-and-steel pavement on the lower level that April. City officials also contemplated adding an asphalt-plank pavement to the bridge. Works Progress Administration (WPA) laborers began repaving the lower level in March 1936; The city government also planned to add lane markings to the lower roadway and convert the upper roadway permanently into a one-way road. After delays caused by material and labor shortages, the repaving of the lower level was completed in June 1937. WPA laborers also completed the tops of the bridge's towers. WPA workers began rebuilding the upper level pavement in July 1938, and the upper roadway closed that October, reopening two months later.

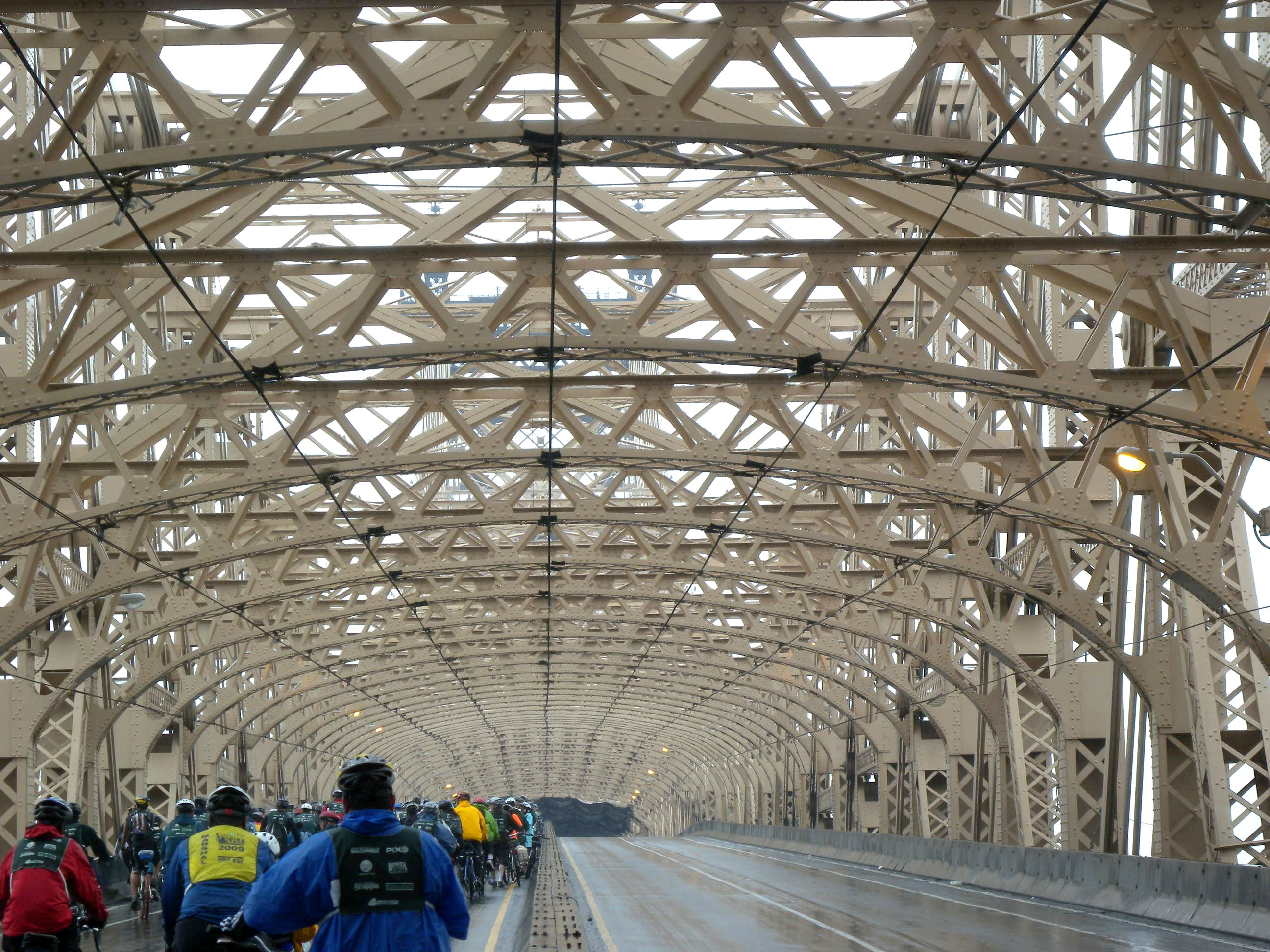
During the Five Boro Bike Tour in 2008

By 1942, the city government was planning to shutter and dismantle the Second Avenue Elevated tracks across the Queensboro Bridge; the line closed in June 1942, and it was demolished by the end of the year. There were also plans in the mid-1940s to connect the bridge's Queens terminal with an expressway running to the John F. Kennedy International Airport. The City Planning Commission proposed rebuilding the Manhattan end of the bridge in late 1946 and adding an eight-story parking garage above the approach viaduct. This proposal was postponed due to a lack of money. The bridge was repainted in 1948, and a $12 million renovation of the bridge was announced the next year. (Note: About $128 million in 2025) The plan included two extra lanes on the upper level, new pavement, a bus terminal in Manhattan, and cloverleaf ramps at the Manhattan approach. The city government was concurrently planning the Welfare Island Bridge, which would allow people to access Welfare Island without needing to use the Queensboro Bridge's elevator.

=== 1950s and 1960s ===
Officials installed fences in 1951 to prevent jaywalking at the Manhattan approach, and the city's parking authority contemplated erecting a parking garage west of the bridge's Manhattan terminus the same year. Public Works commissioner Frederick H. Zurmuhlen announced that October that his office was preparing plans for the northern upper roadway, and he petitioned the city government for $6.5 million for the new roadway. (Note: About $65 million in 2025) By the next year, plans for the roadway and its Manhattan approach were complete, and workers were demolishing buildings to make way for the roadway's Manhattan approach. Zurmuhlen requested $8.2 million from the city in 1953 for the construction of the roadway; (Note: About $79 million in 2025) in exchange, he dropped plans for a bus terminal at the Manhattan end of the bridge. The bridge's approaches were repaved in 1954.

The Board of Estimate allocated $7.7 million in June 1955 for the construction of the northern upper roadway and approach ramps. (Note: About $72 million in 2025) With the opening of the Welfare Island Bridge that year, the city shuttered the trolley lanes, mid-bridge station, and stairs to Roosevelt Island, and it also planned to close down the bridge's elevators. The last trolley traversed the bridge in April 1957, and the elevators and stairs on the Queens side of the bridge were closed the same month, although the elevator in Roosevelt Island would not be demolished for 13 years. The Queens approach ramps were also rebuilt, accounting for over two-thirds of the project's cost. The Thomson Avenue ramp was completed first, followed by the ramp to 21st Street in late 1957. The northern upper roadway opened in September 1958, and the bridge was formally rededicated in April 1959 for its 50th anniversary.

In 1958, Consolidated Edison proposed converting the lower-level trolley tracks into vehicular lanes in exchange for permission to install power cables under the bridge. Consolidated Edison spent $4 million in 1960 (Note: About $33 million in 2025) to install power cables, convert the trolley tracks, and construct slip roads between the lower-level roadways. The new lanes, on the northern and southern sides of the bridge, opened on September 15, 1960. The same year, Manhattan borough president Louis A. Cioffi proposed a $2.06 million ramp at the Manhattan end of the bridge. (Note: About $17 million in 2025) Also during the early 1960s, the city's Department of Public Works requested funding for a feasibility study of additional roadways, and the city's traffic commissioner Henry Barnes studied the feasibility of a computer-controlled traffic monitoring system for the bridge.

In 1964, the NY 24 designation was removed from the road deck, leaving a solo NY 25 to do so. That same year, mayor Robert F. Wagner Jr. approved the demolition of several buildings for a proposed underpass connecting the bridge's westbound lanes with Second Avenue in Manhattan. Had the underpass been built, a bus terminal and landscaped plaza would also have been erected at the Manhattan end of the bridge. These plans were scrapped due to a lack of funding. City planner Robert Moses proposed a 1,000-space parking garage at the bridge's Manhattan end in 1965, though Barnes objected to the plan. Instead, Barnes proposed a 1,100-spot garage on the Queens side, which was approved in June 1966. The bridge was repainted for seven months starting in November 1966 at a cost of $240,000. (Note: About $1.82 million in 2025) Between 1968 and 1970, officials commissioned five studies of Queensboro Bridge traffic, but no changes were made as a result.

=== 1970s to 1990s ===
==== Landmark status and deterioration ====
During the early 1970s, a small terminal for express buses was also proposed for the Manhattan end of the bridge, but it was not built. On November 23, 1973, the New York City Landmarks Preservation Commission (LPC) designated the Queensboro Bridge as a city landmark, preventing any modifications without the LPC's approval. It was the second East River bridge to be so designated, after the Brooklyn Bridge. The Board of Estimate delayed ratification of the landmark designation because some space under the bridge's approaches was used for commercial purposes. The northern lower-level roadway was closed in 1976 while the wires underneath the deck were being replaced.

By the mid-1970s, as the city government considered an open-air market under the bridge, a city engineer described the bridge as severely deteriorated. Among the issues cited were extensive rusting, faulty expansion joints, clogged drains, potholes, and dirt. New York State Department of Transportation (NYSDOT) engineering director George Zaimes described the bridge's frame as being rusty, with some holes that were as large as a person's head. According to Zaimes, the upper roadway was only attached to the bridge "by its own weight and memory".

==== 1970s and 1980s renovations ====
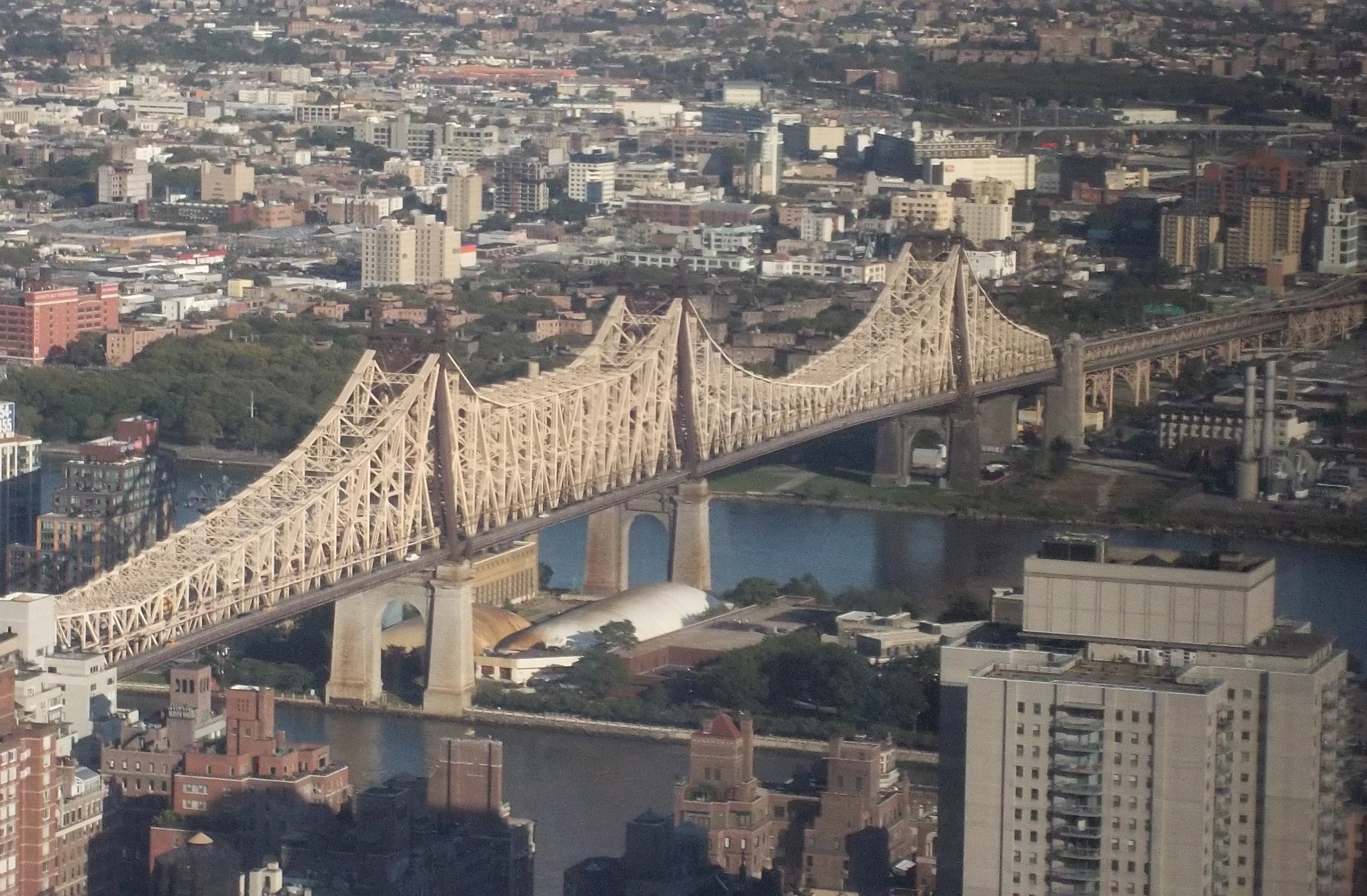
The bridge as seen from the 56th floor of Citigroup Center

The state government started inspecting the Queensboro Bridge and five others in 1978, allocating $1.1 million for a study. That year, the city government also repainted the bridge in a brown and tan color scheme. To reduce congestion, a contraflow lane for express buses was installed at the Manhattan end of the bridge in 1979. That year, the lower deck's outer lanes were closed to vehicles; parts of the outer roadways had weakened to the point that they could barely carry the weight of a passenger car. Repairs to the outer lanes were expected to last for three years and cost $50 million. The southern outer roadway was converted into a pedestrian and bicycle path, which opened in July 1979. The city received $18.6 million in federal funds for the Queensboro Bridge's restoration in 1980. By then, an estimated 175,000 vehicles daily used the bridge.

An extensive renovation commenced on February 25, 1981, and was completed in six phases. That December, the United States Department of Transportation gave $28.8 million for the bridge's renovation. The pedestrian and bike path closed in May 1983. The NYSDOT announced that July that the southern upper roadway, which carried eastbound traffic, would be closed for repairs, which were expected to take 18 months. The northern upper roadway, normally used by westbound traffic. was converted to eastbound-only operation, except during weekday mornings when it carried westbound traffic. The ramp leading from 57th and 58th streets to the southern upper roadway was temporarily closed for reconstruction in early 1984. By the beginning of 1985, the southern upper roadway had reopened after being rebuilt for $31 million. The outer lanes of the lower level had also reopened, but state officials estimated that the project would not be complete until 1992.

The Queensboro Bridge's pedestrian path reopened in July 1985; the same year, the city received another $60 million in federal funds for the renovations of the Queensboro, Manhattan, and Brooklyn bridges. In February 1987, the New York City Department of Transportation (NYCDOT) announced that parts of the northern upper roadway would be closed for two years. As part of the $42 million project, a new concrete deck would be installed, and the steel structure would be restored. The ramps to 62nd and 63rd streets closed in October 1987 and reopened twelve months later. This closure coincided with the renovations of other East River bridges. The lower-level bike path was opened to vehicular traffic at peak times, and flatbed trucks carried bicycles across the bridge. The lower deck's southern outer roadway was closed for emergency repairs in 1988 after workers discovered severe corrosion. The reconstruction of the upper deck was completed in 1989 for $100 million. The bridge was still in poor condition: during a tour of the bridge in 1988, transportation engineer Sam Schwartz peeled off part of one of the bridge's beams with one hand.

==== 1990s renovations ====
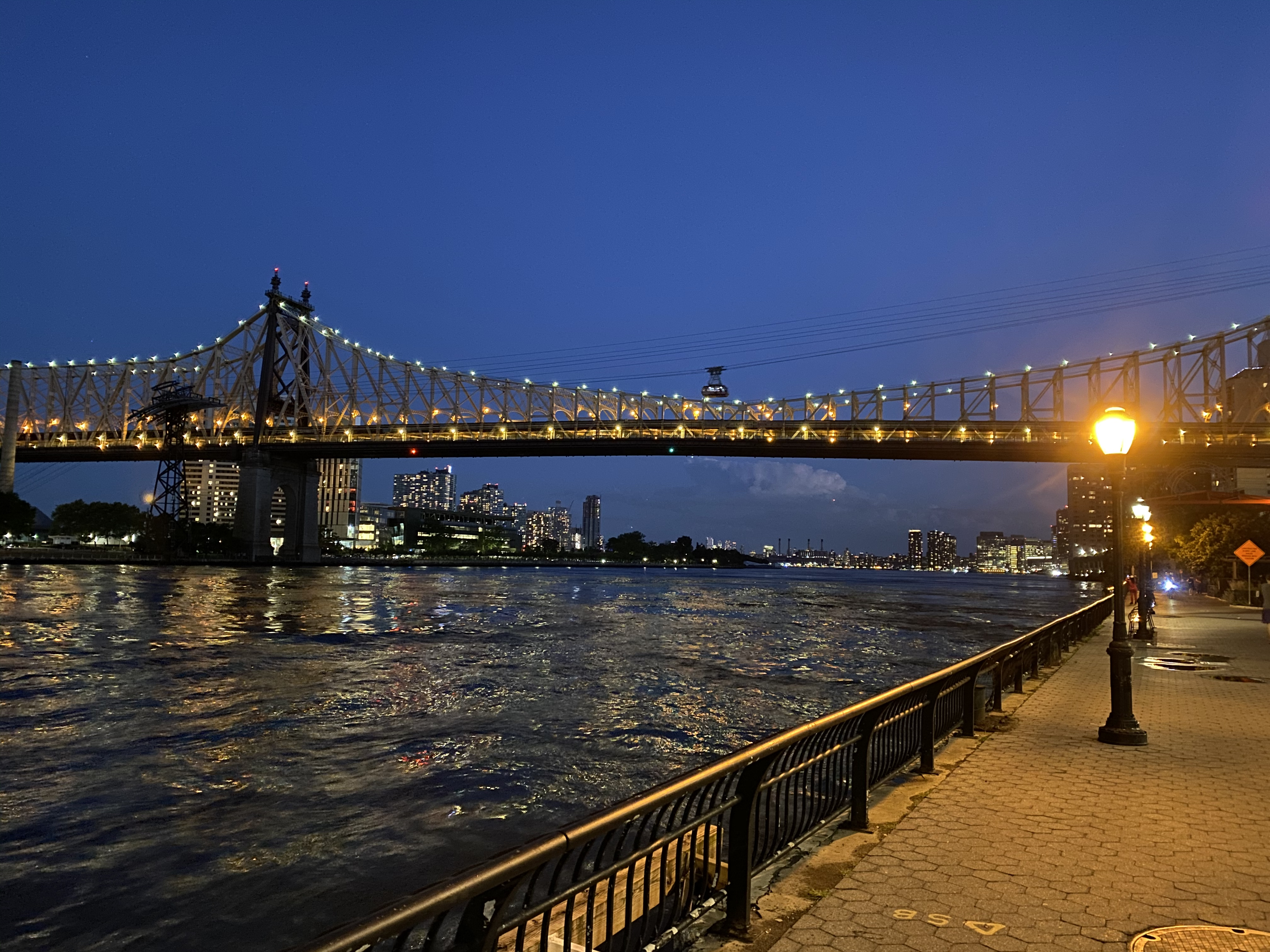
Queensboro Bridge at dusk, as seen from East River Greenway in Manhattan, 2020

The Metropolitan Transportation Authority (MTA) proposed a rail link to LaGuardia and JFK airports in 1990; the line, which would have used the Queensboro Bridge, was canceled in 1995. A renovation of the Queensboro Bridge's lower level began in June 1990, when two Manhattan-bound lanes were closed. This phase of construction was supposed to cost $120 million. The lower deck's partial closure caused severe congestion in Queens, since part of the nearby Long Island Expressway was also closed for renovation. By 1993, the renovation was slated to be completed the next year. At that time, officials announced plans for a Manhattan-bound high-occupancy vehicle (HOV) lane on the bridge during morning rush hours. A Queens-bound HOV lane during the afternoon was deemed infeasible due to heavy congestion in Manhattan. The Manhattan-bound HOV lane opened in April 1994, and all lower-level lanes had reopened by that October.

The NYCDOT announced in 1995 that it would spend another $161 million to renovate the outer lower-level roadways starting the following year. Two lanes were again closed for maintenance from April to September 1996, causing severe congestion. Following complaints from residents near 57th Street, starting in October 1996, traffic on the upper level traveled on the left during rush hours to reduce noise pollution and traffic congestion. Vehicles headed for Queens had to enter at 62nd and 63rd Streets, which caused widespread confusion. After protests from Upper East Side residents, the original right-hand traffic pattern was reinstated on the upper level, and the southern lower roadway (used by pedestrians) was converted to an eastbound vehicular lane during the afternoon rush hour. Some pedestrians and bikers opposed the conversion of the southern lower roadway, as they would have to wait for a van to take them across the bridge during weekday afternoons, but the new traffic pattern was implemented anyway.

In the late 1990s, the NYCDOT hired architect Walter Melvin to renovate the vaults under the Manhattan approach. During the renovation of the main span, a scaffold collapsed in 1997, killing a worker. The renovation of the northern lower roadway was completed in mid-1998. That August, the NYCDOT implemented a new traffic pattern during evening rush hours, where the northern upper roadway carried eastbound traffic, giving the bridge six eastbound and three westbound lanes during that time. The northern lower roadway, which carried pedestrians and cyclists during mornings and off-peak hours, was converted into a westbound lane during the evening rush hour. The NYCDOT's commissioner called the changes an "interim fix for nine to 14 months". By then, about 184,000 vehicles used the bridge daily, with slightly more eastbound than westbound vehicles using the bridge.

=== 2000s to present ===
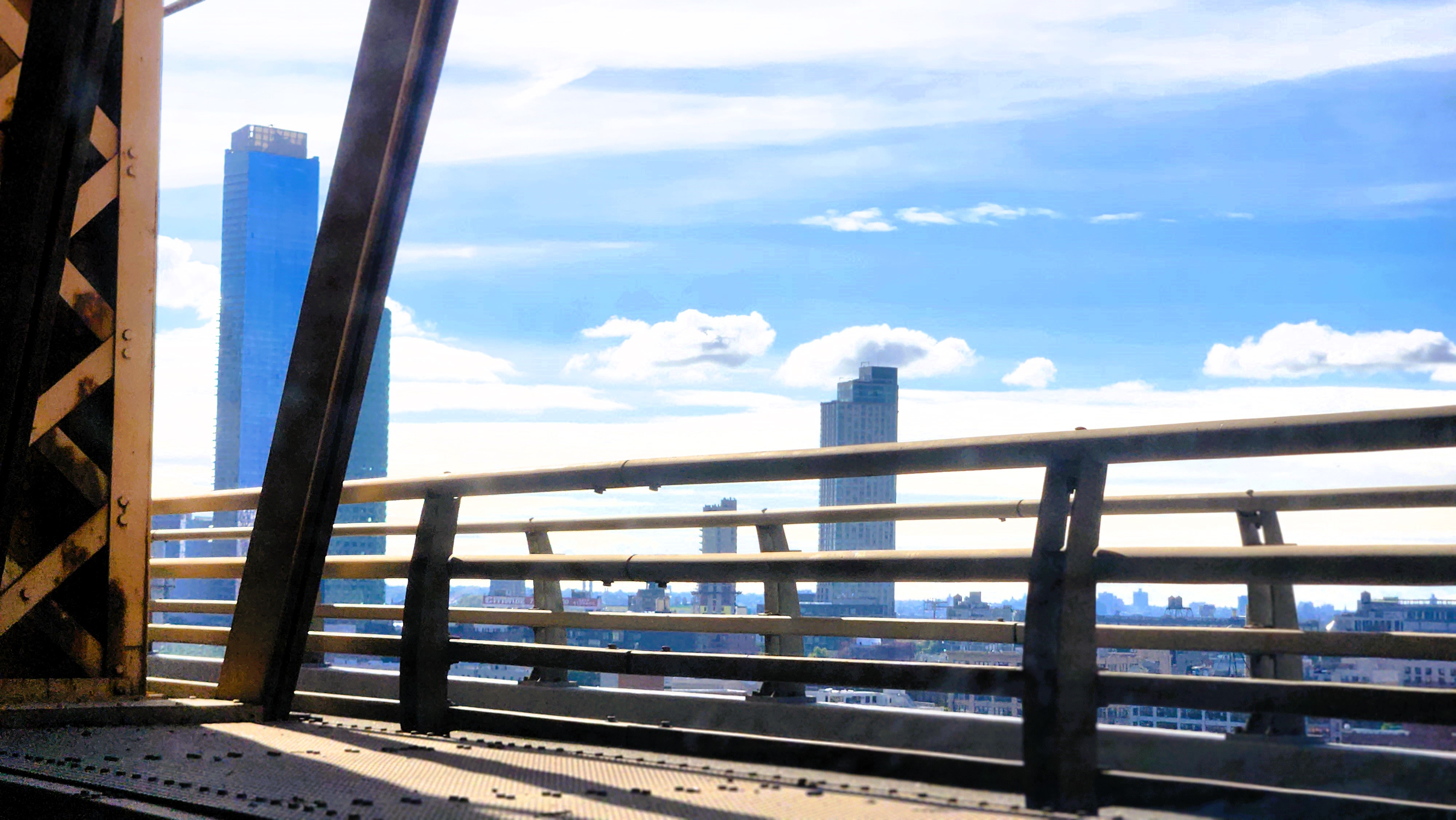
Southern lower roadway and Long Island City seen from the Queensboro Bridge's central lower roadway

Following the completion of additional renovations in September 2000, the northern upper roadway was converted back to a westbound road at all times. The northern lower roadway was converted into a bike and pedestrian path, while the southern lower roadway became an eastbound lane. After the September 11 attacks on the World Trade Center in 2001, drivers without passengers were temporarily banned from using the bridge during rush hours. The city announced plans in 2002 to restore six masonry piers supporting the bridge. The same year, mayor Michael Bloomberg again proposed tolling the four free East River bridges, including the Queensboro Bridge; many local residents opposed his plan, and Bloomberg postponed the tolling plan in 2003.

As part of a $168 million project that began in 2004, workers repainted the bridge. They also added fences and lighting, restored a trolley kiosk on the Manhattan end of the bridge, and restored the Manhattan approach in a separate project between 2003 and 2006. The renovation was temporarily halted in October 2005 after a small fire. A group of Roosevelt Island residents requested in 2007 that the city government install an elevator or stairway from the bridge, but city officials expressed multiple concerns with the proposal, including security vulnerabilities, the need to close a lane of traffic, and the bridge's landmark designation. In March 2009, the New York City Bridge Centennial Commission sponsored events marking the centennial of the bridge's opening. The American Society of Civil Engineers designated the bridge as a National Historic Civil Engineering Landmark the same year.

The bridge was renamed after Ed Koch in 2011. After a series of fatal crashes in 2013, officials closed the southern lower roadway at night. By the middle of the decade, the bridge carried 175,000 daily vehicles, making it the East River's busiest bridge. Mayor Bill de Blasio announced plans in April 2016 to allocate $244 million for repairs to the Queensboro Bridge's upper deck. Concurrently, elected officials proposed adding tolls to the bridge yet again. In January 2021, the city decided to install a two-way protected bike path on the northern lower roadway and convert the southern lower roadway to a pedestrian path. The conversion was delayed because of a renovation of the upper deck, which commenced in February 2022 and required the partial closure of vehicular lanes. The city presented designs for the pedestrian and bike paths in mid-2024. The paths were supposed to open in March 2025, but the opening was postponed by mayor Eric Adams, ultimately occurring that May.

== Public transportation ==
=== Rail service ===
==== Rapid transit ====
The bridge, built with two elevated railway tracks on its upper level, had space for two more tracks. A connection from the Interborough Rapid Transit Company's Second Avenue Elevated to the bridge was first proposed in 1910; early plans called for a line extending to Malba. The elevated tracks were approved in 1913, and the connection opened in 1917, allowing Second Avenue trains to access the Astoria and Flushing lines. The tracks carried elevated trains until service was discontinued in 1942.

There were also plans to run a New York City Subway line across the bridge in September 1909; in a report submitted to the New York City Board of Estimate in June 1911, the Brooklyn Rapid Transit Company was to extend its Broadway Line onto the bridge. By December 1914, the Board of Estimate had abandoned the proposal, which would have required $2.6 million in modifications to the bridge and would have caused serious congestion. Instead, the board proposed the double-tracked 60th Street Tunnel under the East River, which would allow the city to save $500,000. The New York Public Service Commission approved the tunnel in July 1915.

In 1990, the MTA proposed an airport rail link running via the bridge to JFK and LaGuardia airports. This plan was scaled down in 1995, becoming the AirTrain JFK, which serves a small part of Queens.

==== Streetcars ====
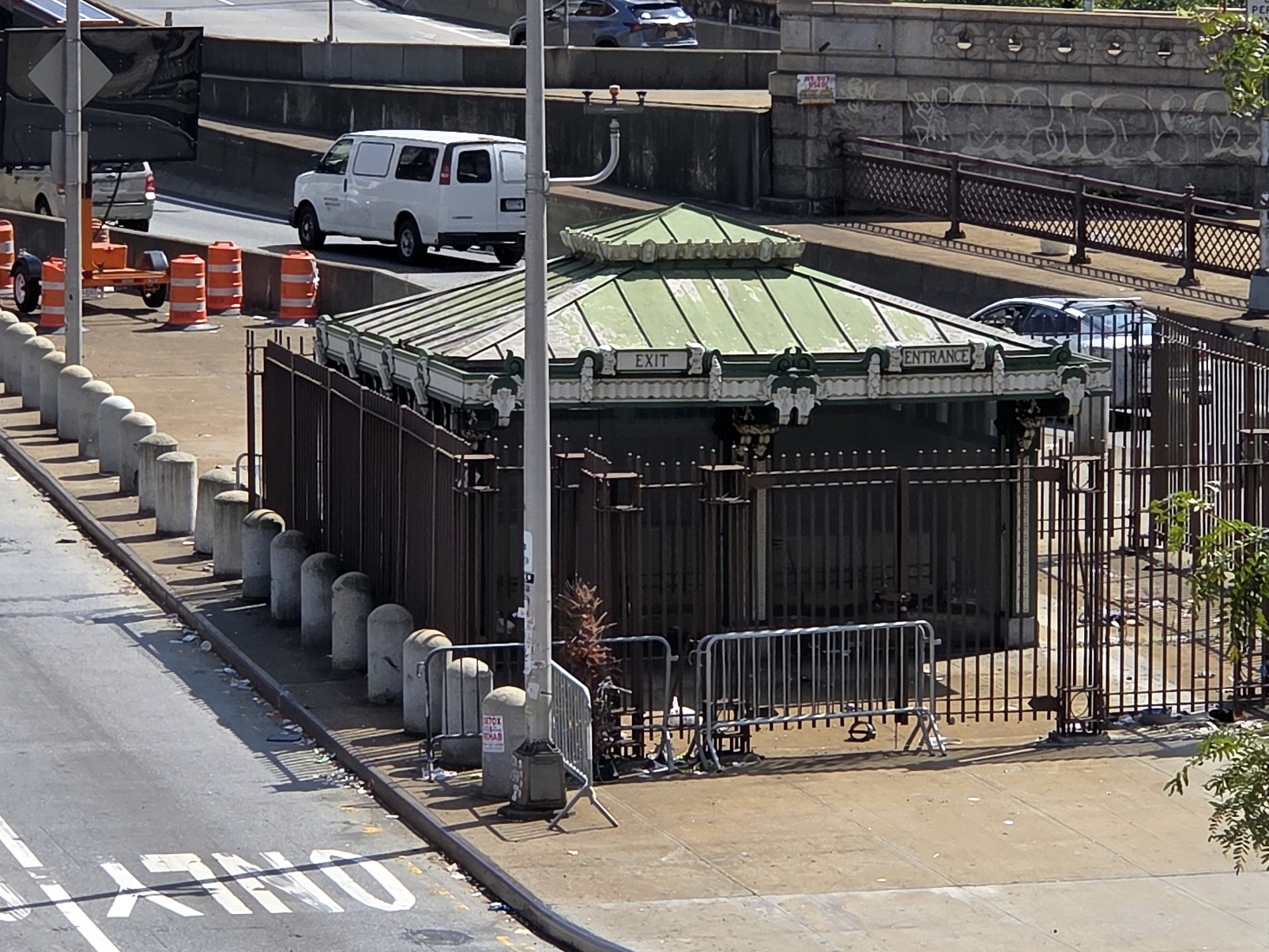
The remaining entrance to the underground streetcar station, in use from 1909 to 1957

The bridge had streetcar tracks occupying the northern and southern lower roadways. On the Manhattan side, there were two ramps from each of the outer lower-level roadways to a set of platforms under Second Avenue. On the Queens side, the tracks split into multiple branches. Six streetcar companies had applied for franchises to use the bridge by late 1908, before its official opening. The first trolleys traveled on the bridge in September 1909, and passenger service began the next month. In the bridge's first decade, the tracks were used by the New York and Queens County Railway, Manhattan and Queens Traction Company, Steinway Lines, and Third Avenue Bridge Company. When the Third Avenue Railway started using the bridge in 1913, it built power infrastructure under the roadway, as its streetcars received power from underground. The South Shore Traction Company also applied for permission to use the bridge but was denied.

A streetcar stop was constructed at the middle of the bridge in 1919 to serve the elevator to Roosevelt Island. The tracks connecting the Third Avenue Railway with the Queensboro Bridge were removed in 1922, after the company stopped using the bridge. Although almost all streetcar service had been withdrawn by 1939, the Queensboro Bridge Local route ran across the bridge until April 7, 1957; it was the last trolley route in New York state.

Streetcar lines on the bridge
Line name	Borough primarily served	Start year	End year
Queensboro Bridge Local	Queens	1909	1957
Astoria Line	Queens	1910	1939
Steinway Line	Queens	1910	1939
College Point Line	Queens	1910	1925
Corona Line	Queens	1910	1922
Queens Boulevard Line	Queens	1913	1937
42nd Street Crosstown Line	Manhattan	1912	1919

On the Manhattan end of the Queensboro Bridge were originally five trolley kiosks, which contained stairs leading to a trolley terminal underground. Lindenthal and Hornbostel designed the structures, which had terracotta-paneled facades, cast-iron columns, and a copper roof with cast-iron fascias. There were arched, glazed-tile ceilings inside each of the kiosks. The kiosks also had Greek key motifs; shields with garlands; and ornamental brackets. The locations of three kiosks are unknown. Another kiosk was sent to the Brooklyn Children's Museum in 1974, then was relocated to Roosevelt Island and renovated into a visitor center. The Roosevelt Island kiosk, which reopened in July 2007, measures 210 square feet (20 m^{2}) across and weighs 86,000 pounds (43 ST; 38 LT; 39 t). Yet another kiosk remains in place in Manhattan but is used as storage space. The remaining kiosk in Manhattan was planned to be removed in 2002 but was instead restored.

=== Buses ===
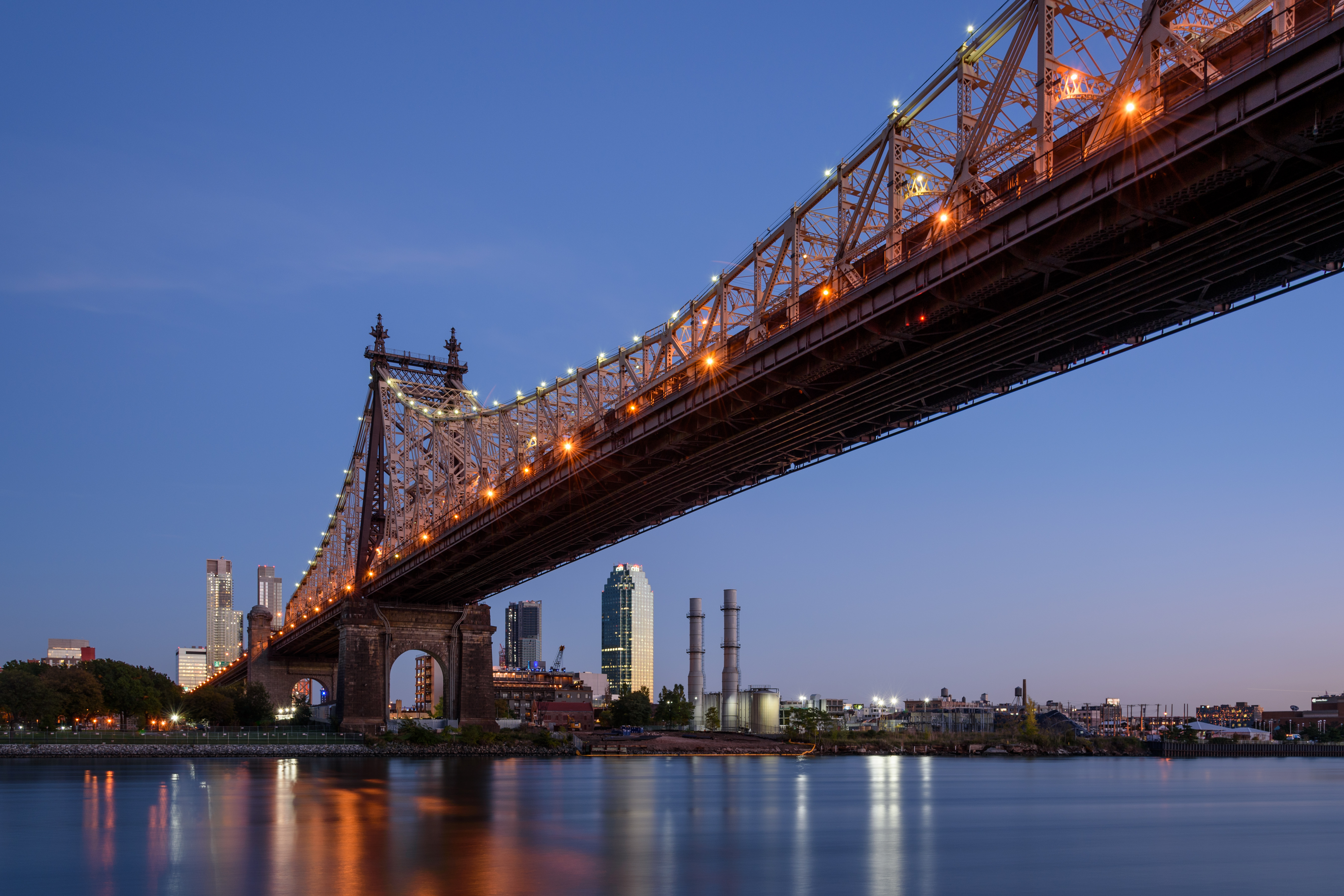
Queensboro Bridge at dusk

The bridge carries two local bus routes operated by MTA Regional Bus Operations: the Q32 and Q60. The bridge also carries 20 express bus routes in the eastbound direction only: the QM1, QM2, QM4, QM5, QM6, QM10, QM15, QM16, QM17, QM18, QM20, QM21, QM24, QM31, QM32, QM34, QM35, QM36, QM40, QM42, QM44, QM63, QM64, QM68, which all use the Queens-Midtown Tunnel for westbound travel.

=== Elevator to Roosevelt Island ===
An elevator from the bridge to Roosevelt Island (then known as Blackwell's Island) was proposed in October 1912. Although various groups opposed an elevator in the middle of the bridge's deck because it would block traffic, an elevator next to the deck was tested the next month. The Board of Estimate provided $366,000 in 1916 (Note: About $7,469,000 in 2025) for an elevator building connecting the bridge to Roosevelt Island. The building, on the bridge's north side, was finished in 1918 or 1919. The building was nine or ten stories tall and had two passenger and three freight elevators. The structure was set back from the bridge to reduce damage in a fire. The top floor was connected to the bridge by a roadway measuring 56 feet (17 m) wide; there was also a stair and a guard's booth. The other nine floors contained various food storage rooms.

After the trolley lines across the bridge were largely replaced by buses in the 1930s, Steinway Transit retained one of the bridge's trolley tracks and established the Queensboro Bridge Railway, a shuttle streetcar route connecting with the elevator to Roosevelt Island. The elevator was demolished in 1970, having been replaced by the Roosevelt Island Bridge. A separate passenger elevator ran during weekdays to Welfare Island, via a storehouse described as "clean but gloomy", until mid-1973.

== Tolls ==
There was originally a ten-cent toll to drive over the bridge, although pedestrians walked across for free. Shortly after the Queensboro Bridge opened, the city government conducted a study and found that it had no authority to charge tolls on the Queensboro and Manhattan bridges. Tolls on the Queensboro Bridge, as well as the Williamsburg, Manhattan, and Brooklyn bridges to the south, were abolished in July 1911 as part of a populist policy initiative headed by New York City mayor William Jay Gaynor. There were also proposals to charge tolls on the bridge in the 1930s, which were heavily opposed by local groups, and in the 1950s, which was rejected as overly expensive.

In 1970, the federal government enacted the Clean Air Act, a series of federal air pollution regulations. As part of a plan by mayor John Lindsay and the federal Environmental Protection Agency, the city government considered implementing tolls on the four East River bridges, including the Queensboro, in the early 1970s. The plan would have raised money for New York City's transit system and allowed the city to meet the Clean Air Act. While there were concerns that the bridge's city-landmark designation could prevent tollbooths from being installed, planners said the tollbooths could just be installed on the bridge's approaches. Specifically, a tollbooth would have been installed on the bridge's Manhattan approach. Queens borough president Donald Manes encouraged the state government to take over the bridge so tolls could not be charged; according to Manes, the tolls would merely increase pollution around Queens Plaza. Abraham Beame, who became mayor in 1974, refused to implement the tolls, and the U.S. Congress subsequently moved to forbid tolls on the East River bridges.

A plan for congestion pricing in New York City was approved in mid-2023, allowing the MTA to toll drivers who use the Queensboro Bridge and then travel south of 60th Street. Congestion pricing was implemented in January 2025; Drivers on the northern upper roadway are exempt from the toll, but all other Manhattan-bound drivers pay a toll, which varies based on the time of day. Although no toll is charged upon exiting the congestion zone, all Queens-bound drivers must pay a toll to access streets leading to the bridge, even if they drive only one or two blocks within the congestion zone.

== Impact ==
=== Reception ===
When plans for the bridge were being finalized in 1901, there was commentary on its cantilevered design; all of the other bridges across the East River at the time were suspension bridges. The city's bridge commissioner at the time, John L. Shea, said that the Queensboro Bridge would not be as "picturesque" compared to a suspension bridge but that it could look as attractive as either the Williamsburg or Brooklyn bridges. Buck said that the U.S. had some "homely" cantilever bridges but hoped the Queensboro Bridge was not ugly. The chief engineer of the city's Bridge Department said in 1904 that he believed the cantilever design was "a mistake" and that a suspension bridge on the same site, supported by three towers, would have been a novelty.

When the bridge was finished in 1908, The Christian Science Monitor wrote that the Queensboro was "one of the greatest bridges in the world, and one of the most beautiful of its type", despite having received relatively little media attention during construction. Two decades after the bridge opened, The New York Times said the "Brooklyn Bridge has the reputation but Queensboro Bridge has the traffic". The New York Daily News wrote in 1981 that the Queensboro Bridge "reminds people of the bridges they built with erector sets as children". Nonetheless, the bridge was not as widely appreciated as the Brooklyn Bridge further south, especially in the late 20th century, and The Los Angeles Times wrote in 2010 that "the Queensboro appears far grittier than the romantic Brooklyn Bridge or the soaring Verrazzano–Narrows Bridge to the south".

=== Impact on development ===
The New-York Tribune wrote in 1904 that the Queensboro Bridge's construction would cause Blackwell's Island to "lose at least a share of its sinister reputation". Even before the bridge was completed, real-estate values in Queens had been increasing several times over, and its construction also spurred the sale of property along 59th Street in Manhattan. Its development allowed various parts of Queens to be served by direct train and streetcar lines to Manhattan. The Brooklyn Daily Eagle predicted in 1908 that the bridge's completion would draw investors toward Long Island and away from New Jersey to the west. The same newspaper predicted that the bridge, along with the Steinway Tunnel and East River Tunnels, would change Long Island from a sparsely populated rural outpost to a densely packed suburb of New York City. A New York Times article from 1923 wrote that the bridge's opening "marked the first step in eliminating the East River as a barrier to the spread of population eastward".

The opening of the bridge encouraged development of vacant land in Queens, where tracts were resold for residential and commercial use. Many industrial firms began operating in western Queens, including vehicle-manufacturing plants in Long Island City. By the early 1910s, numerous industrial structures and loft buildings had been built around the bridge's Queens end, particularly on Queens Plaza. Further east, neighborhoods such as Jackson Heights were built on former farmland. The Queensboro Chamber of Commerce's spokesperson said in 1924 that real estate values in Queens had tripled within 15 years of the bridge's opening, while the population grew from 284,000 to 736,000. At the bridge's 50th anniversary, The New York Times credited the bridge with encouraging industrial and residential development in Queens. Newsday wrote in the 1990s: "More than any other development, the Queensboro Bridge created the modern urban borough of Queens." The completion of the Queensboro Bridge inspired what became Queens Boulevard, although the thoroughfare was not finished until 1936.

=== Media ===
Because of its design and location, the Queensboro Bridge has appeared in numerous media works, including films and TV shows, set in New York City. For example, the title of Simon & Garfunkel's 1966 song "The 59th Street Bridge Song (Feelin' Groovy)" refers to the Queensboro Bridge, and it has been mentioned in media such as F. Scott Fitzgerald's 1925 novel The Great Gatsby and Truman Capote's 1943 novel Summer Crossing. The bridge has been the setting or filming location for several movies, such as Manhattan (1979), Spider-Man (2002) and The Dark Knight Rises (2012). In addition, it is shown in the opening credits of the TV series Taxi.

== See also ==
- List of bridges and tunnels in New York City
- List of bridges documented by the Historic American Engineering Record in New York
- List of bridges and tunnels on the National Register of Historic Places in New York
- List of New York City Designated Landmarks in Manhattan from 59th to 110th Streets
- List of New York City Designated Landmarks in Queens
- National Register of Historic Places listings in Manhattan from 59th to 110th Streets
- National Register of Historic Places listings in Queens, New York
