= Condemnation =

Condemnation may refer to:

- Damnation, the antithesis of salvation
- The condemnation of a property
- The act of eminent domain which refers to the power of a government to take private property for public use
- "Condemnation" (song), a 1993 song by Depeche Mode
- Condemnation (novel), a 2003 fantasy novel by Richard Baker

== See also ==
- The Condemnations of 1210–1277, a series of condemnations or restrictions on certain medieval teachings at the University of Paris
- Condemned (disambiguation)
