= Condemned property =

Property that has been closed, seized, or restricted by authorities

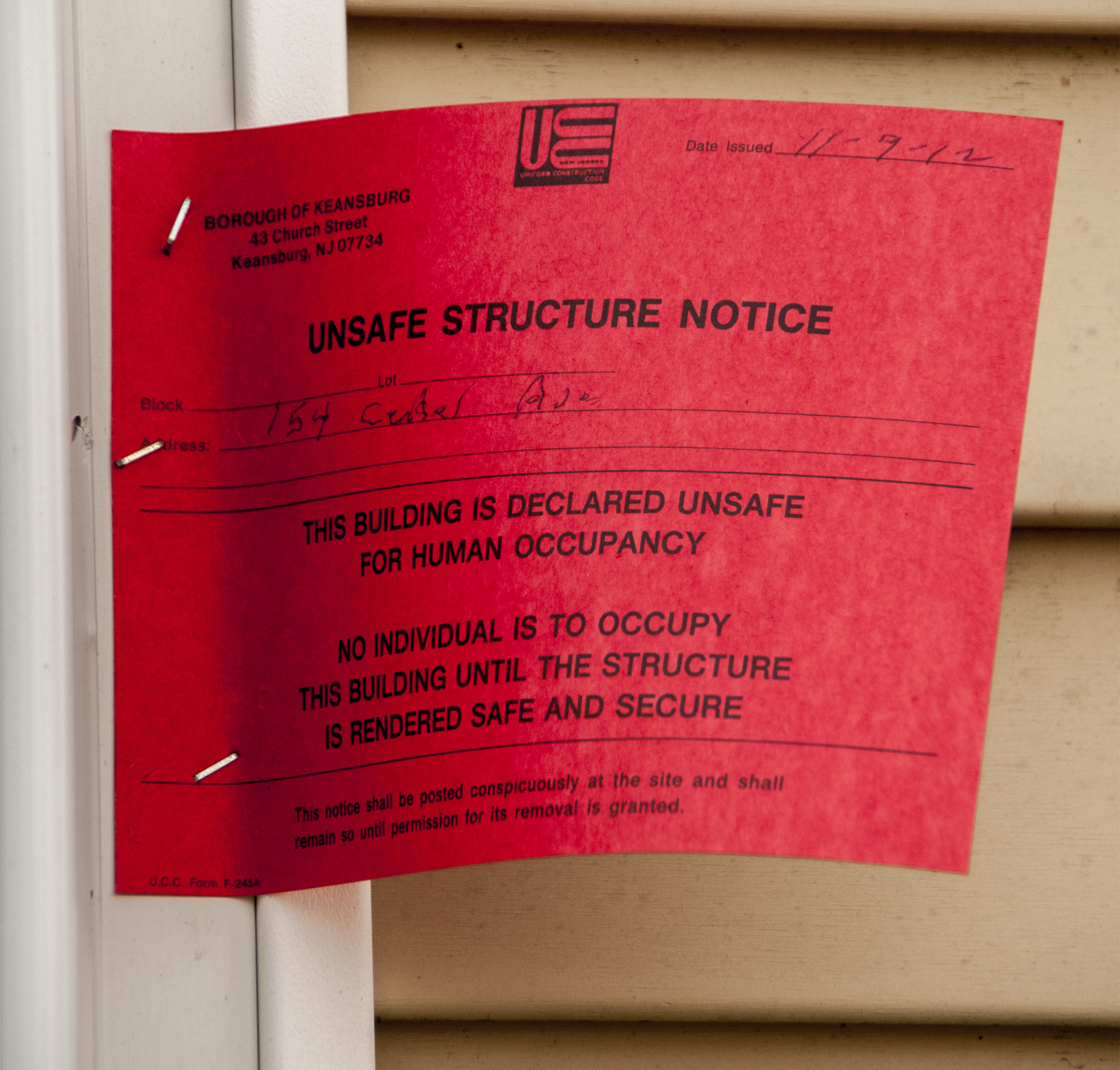
Condemned building after being damaged by Hurricane Sandy

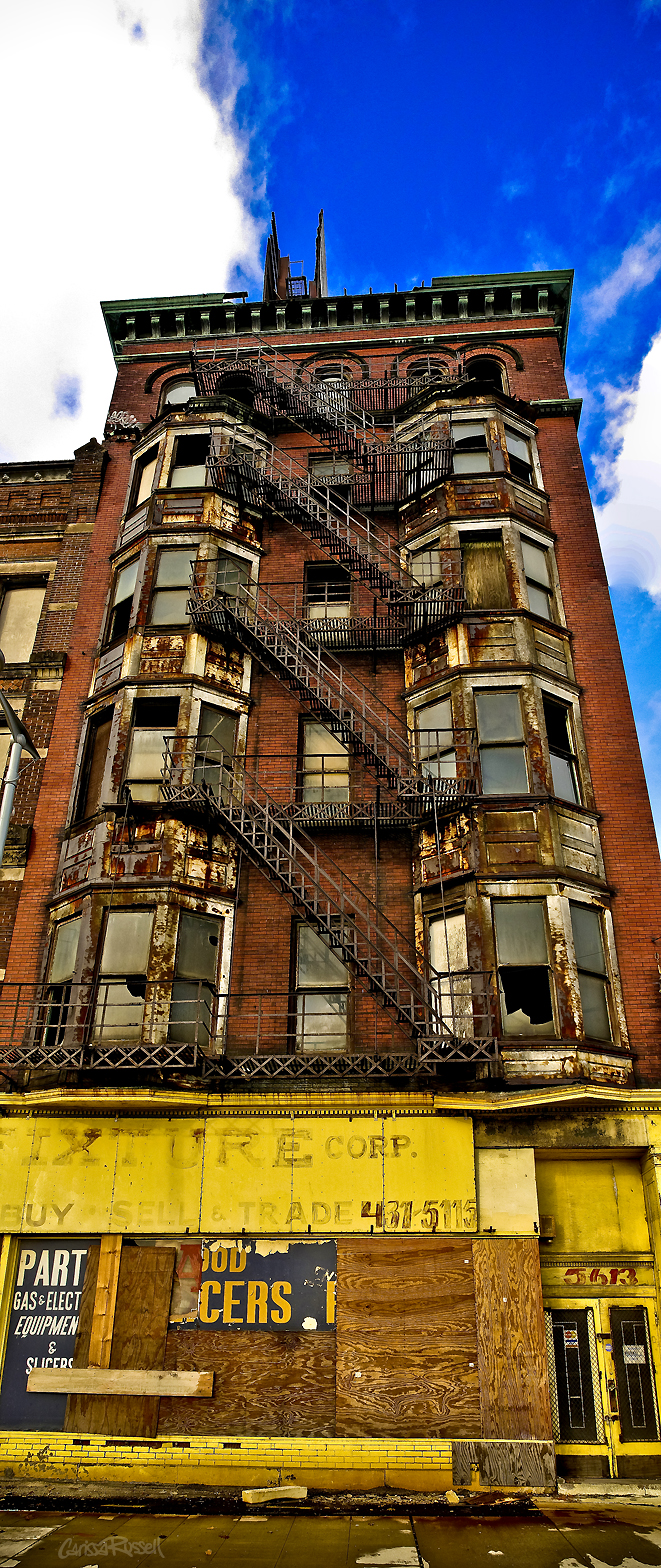
Built in 1895, the Cobb & Bradley Building in Cleveland was condemned in 2004 after years of neglect and demolished by the city in 2009.

A condemned property or a condemned building is a property or building that local (usually municipal) authorities have closed, seized, or placed restrictions on for various reasons, including public safety and public health, in accordance with local ordinance.

== Characteristics ==
In most cities, condemned properties are usually buildings that are extremely dilapidated, damaged or deteriorated, so that they are likely to collapse or become an unattractive nuisance or urban blight. Such buildings may also be fire hazards or severe health hazards, and may be infested with rodents or vermin and lacking in basic facilities such as water, electricity, and heat. Sometimes, such properties can be associated with illegal drug activity. They are typically in violation of other code requirements that make it dangerous to occupants or the public. Food storage premises within the municipality that are deemed non-rat-proof have also historically been candidates for condemnation. In conjunction with condemnation, local authorities may prohibit or restrict occupancy, prohibit habitation, seize the property, prohibit certain actions such as preparation of food or transaction of business, mandate remedial actions, or raze the structure.

== History ==
Municipalities of Cumberland, Maryland, were given the power to condemn and seize insanitary buildings in 1915.

In 2000, a Swedish researcher reports a case study in which after many years of puzzlement and contention, a building that housed government employees was condemned for sick building syndrome; that is, something indeterminate about the building itself made the occupants ill.

== See also ==
- Board of Condemnation
