= 18th Cavalry =

18th Cavalry may refer to:

== Divisions ==
- 18th Cavalry Division (Soviet Union)

== Regiments and battalions ==
- 18th Cavalry (India)
- 18th Cavalry Regiment (United States)
- 18th Corps Cavalry Regiment

=== American Civil War units ===
==== Union Army ====
- 18th Pennsylvania Cavalry Regiment

==== Confederate Army ====
- 18th Arkansas Cavalry Battalion
- 18th Mississippi Cavalry Battalion
- 18th Virginia Cavalry Regiment

== See also ==
- 18th Division (disambiguation)
- 18th Regiment (disambiguation)
- 18th (disambiguation)
