= 18th Infantry =

18th Infantry may refer to:

- 18th Infantry Division (disambiguation)
- 18th Infantry Brigade (disambiguation)
- 18th Infantry Regiment (disambiguation)

== See also ==
- 18th (disambiguation)
