= Eighteenth =

Eighteenth is the ordinal form of the number 18. Eighteenth or 18th may also refer to:

- A fraction, 1/18th, equal to one of 18 equal parts
- 18th of the month, a recurring calendar date
- 18th birthday, the age of majority in a substantial majority of countries

== Geography ==
- 18th meridian east, a line of longitude
- 18th meridian west, a line of longitude
- 18th parallel north, a circle of latitude
- 18th parallel south, a circle of latitude
- 18th Avenue (disambiguation)
- 18th Street (disambiguation)

== Military ==
- 18th Army (disambiguation)
- 18th Battalion (disambiguation)
- 18th Division (disambiguation)
- 18th Regiment (disambiguation)
- 18th Squadron (disambiguation)

== Others ==
- Eighteenth Amendment (disambiguation)
  - Eighteenth Amendment to the United States Constitution
- 18th century
- 18th century BC
- 18th Congress (disambiguation)
- 18th Newtownabbey Old Boys, a football club from Northern Ireland

== See also ==
- 18 (disambiguation)
