= Avenue U station =

Avenue U station may refer to:

- Avenue U (BMT Brighton Line), a local station on the BMT Brighton Line
- Avenue U (BMT Sea Beach Line), a local station on the BMT Sea Beach Line
- Avenue U (IND Culver Line), a local station on the IND Culver Line
