= Kings Highway station (BMT Sea Beach Line) =

New York City Subway station in Brooklyn

Kings Highway
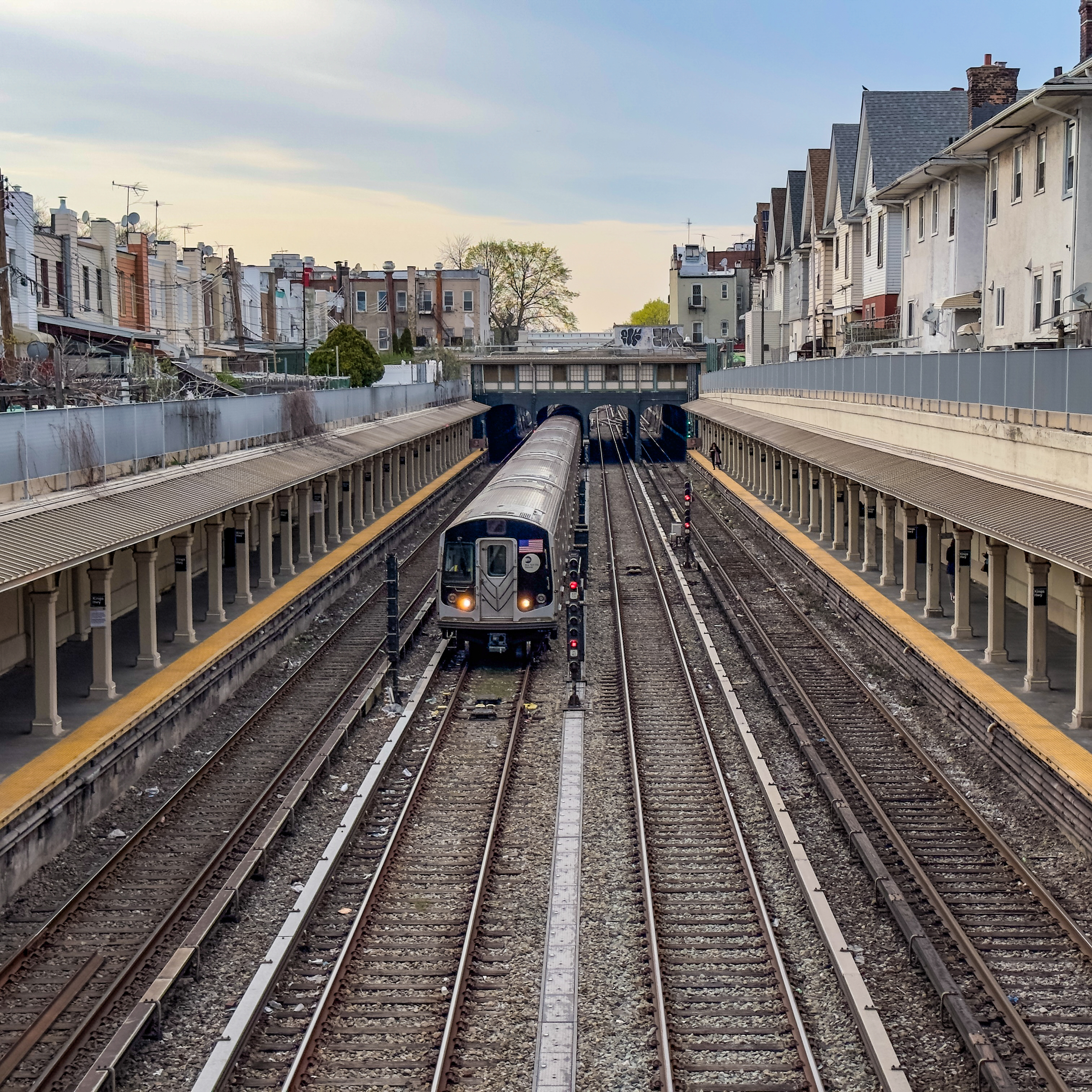
- View from the Highlawn Av overpass

Station statistics
- Address: Kings Highway & West Seventh Street; Brooklyn, New York
- Borough: Brooklyn
- Locale: Gravesend
- Coordinates: 40°36′11.33″N 73°58′48.83″W
- Division: B (BMT)
- Line: BMT Sea Beach Line
- Services: N (all times); W (selected rush-hour trips)
- Transit: NYCT Bus: B82, B82 SBS
- Structure: Open-cut
- Platforms: 2 side platforms
- Tracks: 4 (2 in regular service)

Other information
- Opened: June 22, 1915; 111 years ago
- Closed: January 18, 2016; 10 years ago (northbound reconstruction); July 31, 2017; 9 years ago (southbound reconstruction)
- Rebuilt: May 22, 2017; 9 years ago (northbound reopening); October 29, 2018; 7 years ago (southbound reopening)
- Accessible: No; planned

Traffic
- 2025: 1,362,835 ▲5.2%
- Rank: 247 out of 423
Services
Preceding station	New York City Subway	Following station
Bay Parkway N W toward Astoria–Ditmars Boulevard	Local	Avenue U N W toward Coney Island–Stillwell Avenue
Location
Location within New York City Subway
Location within New York City
Location within New York
Track layout
Street map
Station service legend
Symbol	Description
Stops all times	Stops all times
Stops rush hours only	Stops rush hours only
Stops rush hours in the peak direction only	Stops rush hours in the peak direction only

The Kings Highway station is a local station on the BMT Sea Beach Line of the New York City Subway, located at the intersection of Kings Highway and West Seventh Street in Gravesend, Brooklyn. It is served by the N train at all times. During rush hours, several W trains also serve this station.

== History ==
This station opened on June 22, 1915, along with the rest of the Sea Beach Line.

From January 18, 2016, to May 22, 2017, the Manhattan-bound platform at this station was closed for renovations. The Coney Island-bound platform was closed from July 31, 2017 to October 29, 2018. In 2019, the Metropolitan Transportation Authority announced that this station would become ADA-accessible as part of the agency's 2020–2024 Capital Program. The project was to be funded by congestion pricing in New York City, but it was postponed in June 2024 after the implementation of congestion pricing was delayed.

== Station layout ==
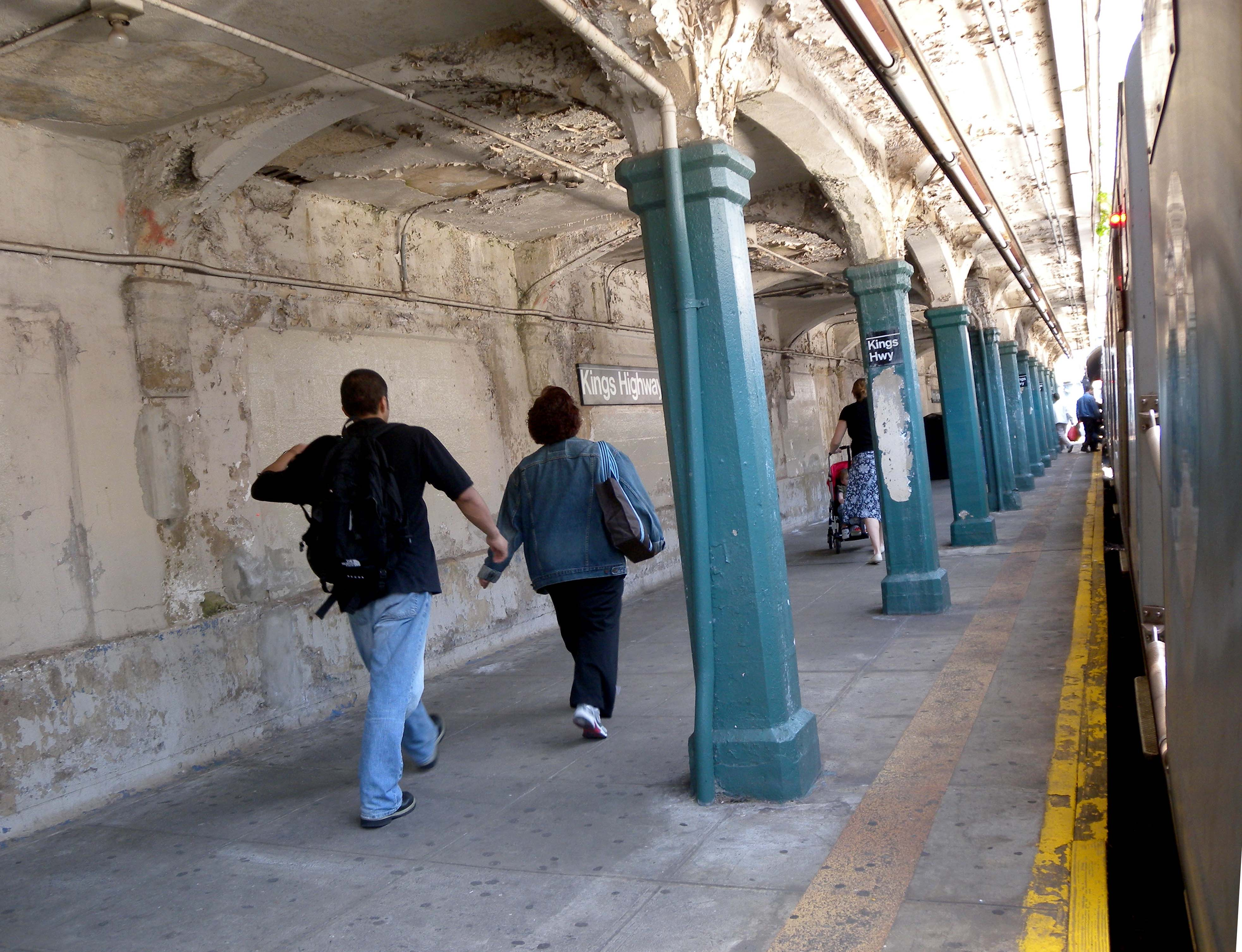
Southbound platform, pre-renovation

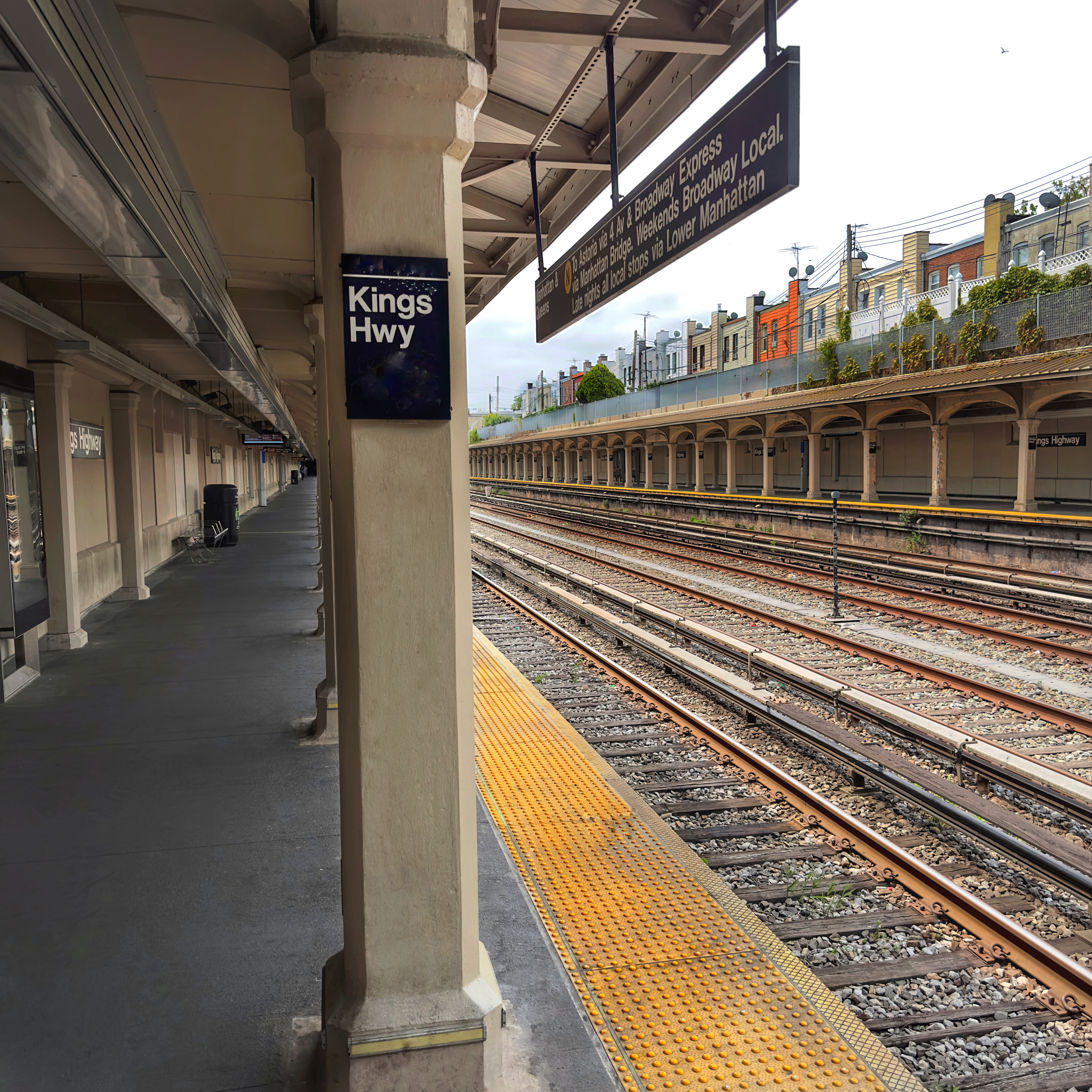
Northbound platform, post-renovation

This open-cut station has four tracks and two side platforms. The two center express tracks are not normally used, but both tracks are available for rerouted trains. The platforms are carved within the Earth's crust on an open cut. The concrete walls and columns are painted beige (previously the columns were blue-green).

Highlawn Av entrance of the Kings Highway Station

This station has two entrances, both of which are beige station houses at street-level between West Seventh and West Eighth Streets above the tracks. Each one has a single staircase leading to each platform at either extreme ends. The main exit at the north end has a turnstile bank and token booth and leads to Kings Highway while the exit at the south end leads to Highlawn Avenue and is un-staffed, containing just a mini turnstile bank.

At the southeast end of the station, switches allow trains to crossover between any of the four tracks. North of here, the Manhattan-bound express track continues with the rest of Sea Beach Line, but there are no signals until Eighth Avenue, so only one train is allowed to run along this stretch at a time. It is signaled for bi-directional service like other center tracks on three track lines throughout the system. The Coney Island-bound express track has been severed from the other three tracks between Eighth Avenue and this station and is unusable for service. South of this station, the two usable express tracks continue until they merge with the local tracks south of 86th Street station.
