= 18 Squadron =

18 Squadron or 18th Squadron may refer to:

- No. 18 (Netherlands East Indies) Squadron RAAF, a unit of the Royal Australian Air Force
- No. 18 Squadron IAF, a unit of the Indian Air Force
- No. 18 Squadron RAF, a unit of the United Kingdom Royal Air Force
- 18th Squadron (Observation), a unit of the United States Army Air Service
- 18th Aggressor Squadron, a unit of the United States Air Force
- 18th Combat Mapping Squadron, a unit of the United States Army Air Force
- 18th Intelligence Squadron, a unit of the United States Air Force
- 18th Flight Test Squadron, a unit of the United States Air Force
- 18th Reconnaissance Squadron, a unit of the United States Air Force
- 18th Space Defense Squadron, a unit of the United States Space Force
- 18th Squadron (Belgium), a unit of the Belgian Air Force
- Marine Wing Communications Squadron 18, a unit of the United States Marine Corps
- Marine Tactical Air Command Squadron 18, a unit of the United States Marine Corps

== See also ==
- XVIII Corps (disambiguation)
- 18th Division (disambiguation)
- 18th Brigade (disambiguation)
- 18th Regiment (disambiguation)
- 18th Battalion (disambiguation)
