= 18th Army =

Eighteenth Army or 18th Army may refer to:

== Germany ==
- 18th Army (German Empire), a World War I field Army
- 18th Army (Wehrmacht), a World War II field army

== Japan ==
- Eighteenth Army (Japan), Imperial Japanese Army
- Eighteenth Area Army, Imperial Japanese Army

== Russia/Soviet Union ==
- 18th Combined Arms Army, Russia
- 18th Army (Soviet Union)
- 18th Air Army, Soviet Union
- 18th Guards Army, Soviet Union

== See also ==
- 18th Army Group
- List of armies by number
- XVIII Corps (disambiguation)
- 18th Division (disambiguation)
- 18th Brigade (disambiguation)
- 18th Regiment (disambiguation)
- 18th Battalion (disambiguation)
- 18th Squadron (disambiguation)
- 18th (disambiguation)
