= Bay Parkway station (BMT Sea Beach Line) =

New York City Subway station in Brooklyn

Bay Parkway
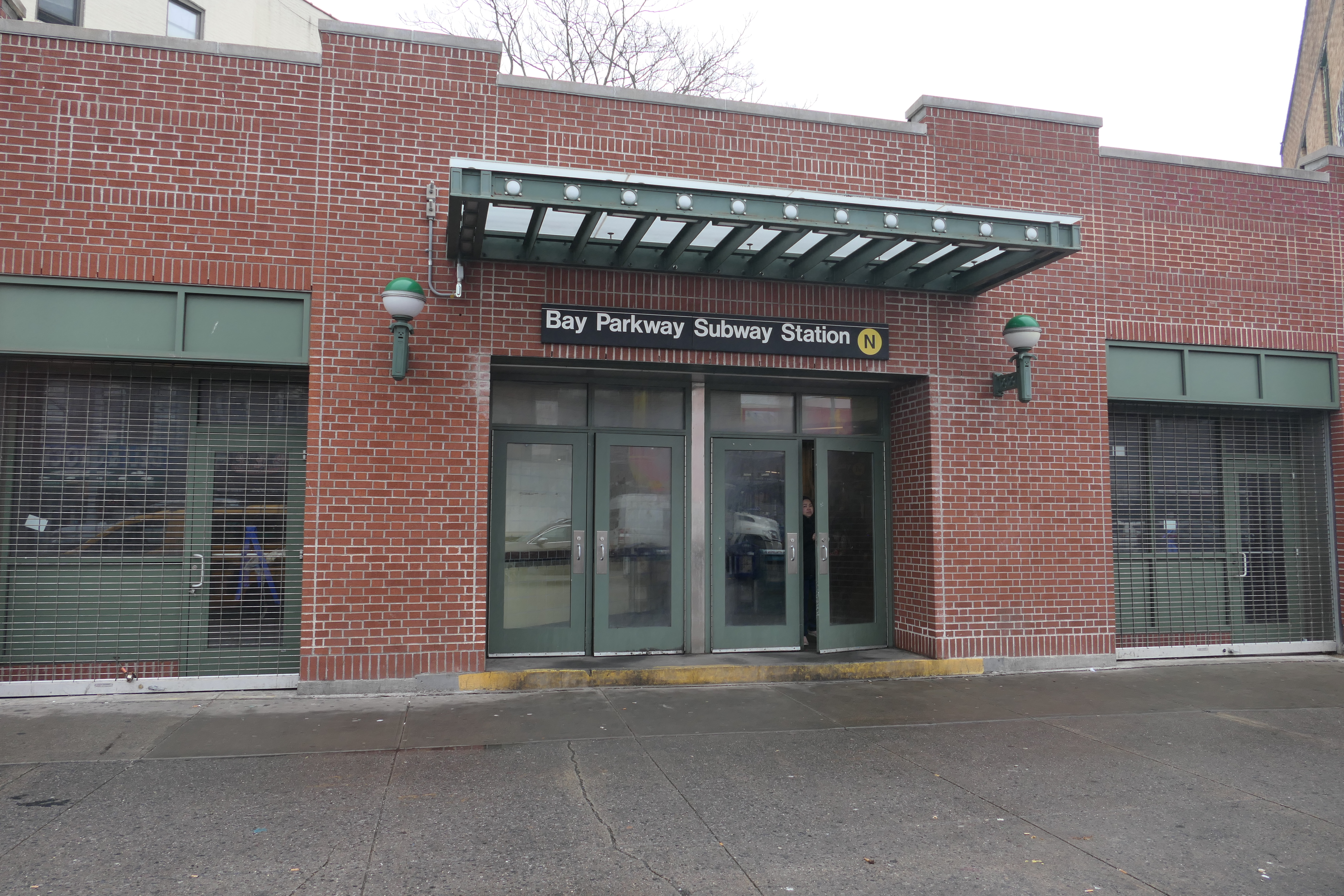
- Bay Parkway station house

Station statistics
- Address: Bay Parkway & West Seventh Street; Brooklyn, New York
- Borough: Brooklyn
- Locale: Bensonhurst
- Coordinates: 40°36′46.39″N 73°58′55.17″W
- Division: B (BMT)
- Line: BMT Sea Beach Line
- Services: N (all times); W (selected rush-hour trips)
- Transit: NYCT Bus: B6
- Structure: Open-cut
- Platforms: 2 side platforms
- Tracks: 4 (2 in regular service)

Other information
- Opened: June 22, 1915 (111 years ago)
- Former/other names: 22nd Avenue

Traffic
- 2025: 1,624,915 ▲3.8%
- Rank: 215 out of 423
Services
Preceding station	New York City Subway	Following station
20th Avenue N W toward Astoria–Ditmars Boulevard	Local	Kings Highway N W toward Coney Island–Stillwell Avenue
Location
Location within New York City Subway
Location within New York City
Location within New York
Track layout
Street map
Station service legend
Symbol	Description
Stops all times	Stops all times
Stops rush hours only	Stops rush hours only
Stops rush hours in the peak direction only	Stops rush hours in the peak direction only

The Bay Parkway station (formerly known as the 22nd Avenue station) is a local station on the BMT Sea Beach Line of the New York City Subway, located in Bensonhurst, Brooklyn at the intersection of Bay Parkway and West Seventh Street. It is served by the N train at all times. During rush hours, several W trains also serve this station.

== History ==
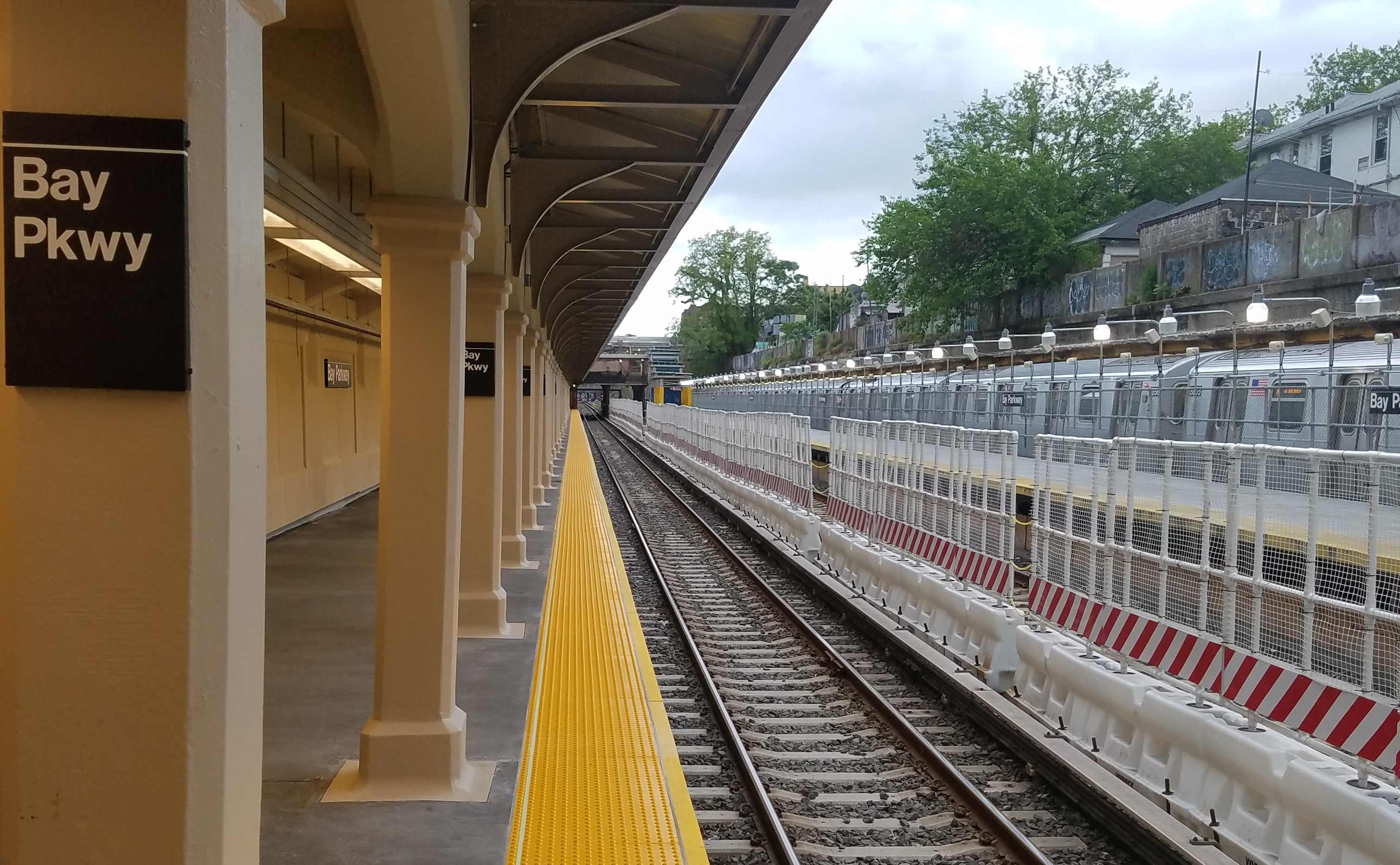
The Coney Island-bound platform after rehabilitation

This station opened on June 22, 1915, along with the rest of the Sea Beach Line.

As of 2012, all three tracks have been replaced with a new track bed and new track panels. From January 18, 2016, to May 22, 2017, the Manhattan-bound platform at this station was closed for renovations and a temporary wooden platform was placed over the Coney Island-bound express track for the Manhattan-bound service. The Coney Island-bound platform was closed from July 31, 2017 to July 1, 2019. During this time, all southbound trains used the northbound express track and the temporary platform, with short-turn W trains terminating here instead of their normal terminus at Gravesend–86th Street.

== Station layout ==
This open-cut station has four tracks and two side platforms. The two center express tracks are not normally used. The Coney Island-bound track has been disconnected from the line and the Manhattan-bound track is signaled for trains in both directions. Both platforms are carved into the earth with the concrete walls painted beige. Beige (previously blue-green) columns, a few of which being I-beams, run along both platforms for the entire length with every other one having the standard black station name plate with white lettering.

=== Exits ===
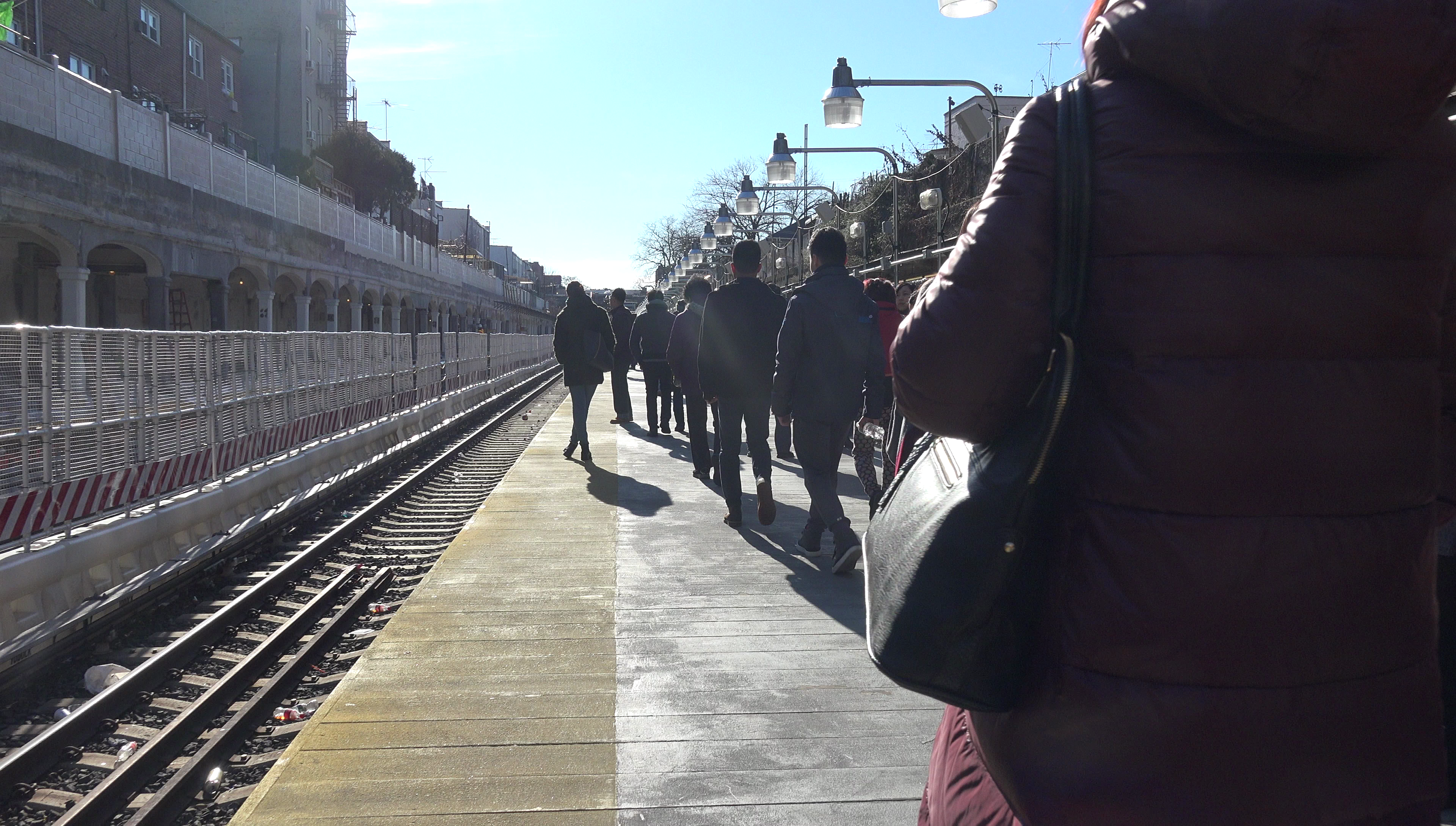
The temporary middle platform in 2016

This station has two entrances/exits at either extreme ends, both of which are station houses on the overpass above the tracks. The full-time one is at the west (railroad north) end. It has a single staircase from platform, a crossover, and waiting area. Outside the turnstiles, there is a token booth before doors lead out to Bay Parkway and 66th Street. The station house is made of tile and stucco and built within other businesses.

The other station house at the south end is made of patchwork and is un-staffed, containing just HEET turnstiles and exit-only turnstiles. Inside fare control, there is a waiting area, crossover, and one staircase to each platform. The doors outside fare control lead to Avenue O. The distance between Avenue O and Bay Parkway make the platforms much longer than the standard B Division train length of 600 feet (180 m).
