= Eighteenth Amendment =

The Eighteenth Amendment may refer to:

- Eighteenth Amendment to the United States Constitution, which established Prohibition
- Eighteenth Amendment of the Constitution of India, 1966 amendment which clarified the meaning of "state"
- Eighteenth Amendment of the Constitution of Ireland, which permitted the state to ratify the Amsterdam Treaty
- Eighteenth Amendment to the Constitution of Pakistan, which reduced the powers of the President of Pakistan
- Eighteenth Amendment of the Constitution of South Africa, which made South African Sign Language an official language
- Homer vs. the Eighteenth Amendment, an episode of the television series The Simpsons
