= Eighteenth of the month =

Recurring ordinal calendar date

The eighteenth of the month or eighteenth day of the month is the recurring calendar date position corresponding to the day numbered 18 of each month. In the Gregorian calendar (and other calendars that number days sequentially within a month), this day occurs in every month of the year, and therefore occurs twelve times per year.

- Eighteenth of January
- Eighteenth of February
- Eighteenth of March
- Eighteenth of April
- Eighteenth of May
- Eighteenth of June
- Eighteenth of July
- Eighteenth of August
- Eighteenth of September
- Eighteenth of October
- Eighteenth of November
- Eighteenth of December

In addition to these dates, this date occurs in months of many other calendars, such as the Bengali calendar and the Hebrew calendar.

== See also ==
- Eighteenth (disambiguation)
