= 18th Brigade =

18th Brigade may refer to:

== Australia ==
- 18th Brigade (Australia)

== British India ==
- 18th (Belgaum) Brigade
- 18th Indian Infantry Brigade

== Japan ==
- 18th Independent Mixed Brigade

== Russia ==
- 18th Guards Motor Rifle Brigade
- 18th Motor Rifle Brigade

== Ukraine ==
- 18th Army Aviation Brigade
- 18th Sloviansk Brigade

== United Kingdom ==
- 18th Infantry Brigade (United Kingdom)
- 18th Mounted Brigade
- 18th Reserve Brigade

=== Artillery units ===
- 18th Brigade Royal Field Artillery
- XVIII Brigade, Royal Horse Artillery (T.F.)

== United States ==
- 18th Aviation Brigade (United States)
- 18th Engineer Brigade
- 18th Field Artillery Brigade
- 18th Military Police Brigade

== Yugoslavia ==
- 18th (Croatian) Eastern Bosnian Brigade, an irregular formation of Yugoslav partisans which opposed German forces during World War II

== See also ==
- 18th Army (disambiguation)
- XVIII Corps (disambiguation)
- 18th Division (disambiguation)
- 18th Regiment (disambiguation)
- 18th Battalion (disambiguation)
- 18 Squadron (disambiguation)
