= 18th Avenue =

18th Avenue is an avenue in Brooklyn. It may refer to the following New York City Subway stations that serve the avenue:

- 18th Avenue (IND Culver Line); serving the F train
- 18th Avenue (BMT Sea Beach Line); serving the N train (W train part-time)
- 18th Avenue (BMT West End Line); serving the D train

== See also ==
- 18 Av, the eighteenth day of Av, the fifth month of the Hebrew calendar
