= XVIII Corps =

XVIII Corps, 18th Corps, or 18th Army Corps may refer to:

== Germany ==
=== German Empire ===
- XVIII Corps (German Empire)
- XVIII Reserve Corps

=== Nazi Germany ===
- XVIII Army Corps (Wehrmacht)
- XVIII SS Corps, Waffen-SS

== United Kingdom ==
- XVIII Corps (United Kingdom)

=== Artillery Volunteer Corps ===
- 18th (Great Lever) Lancashire Artillery Volunteer Corps

=== Rifle Volunteer Corps ===
- 18th (Stockport) Cheshire Rifle Volunteer Corps
- 18th (Whaley Bridge) Derbyshire Rifle Volunteer Corps
- 18th (Bromley Rifle Club) Kent Rifle Volunteer Corps
- 18th Lanarkshire Rifle Volunteer Corps
- 18th (Liverpool Irish) Rifle Volunteer Corps
- 18th (Harrow Rifles) Middlesex Rifle Volunteer Corps
- 18th (Paddington Rifles) Middlesex Rifle Volunteer Corps
- 18th (Kingswinford) Staffordshire Rifle Volunteer Corps
- 18th (Henfield) Sussex Rifle Volunteer Corps
- 18th (Pontefract) Yorkshire West Riding Rifle Volunteer Corps

== United States ==
- XVIII Airborne Corps
- XVIII Corps (Union Army), American Civil War

== Other countries ==
- 18th Corps (People's Republic of China)
- 18th Army Corps (France)
- XVIII Army Corps (Italy)
- XVIII Corps (Ottoman Empire)
- 18th Army Corps (Russian Empire)
- 18th Western Slavonian Corps, Serbian Krajina
- 18th Air Defense Corps, Soviet Union
- 18th Army Corps (Ukraine)

== See also ==
- List of military corps by number
- 18th Army (disambiguation)
- 18th Division (disambiguation)
- 18th Brigade (disambiguation)
- 18th Regiment (disambiguation)
- 18th Battalion (disambiguation)
- 18th Squadron (disambiguation)
- 18th (disambiguation)
