= 20th Avenue station (BMT Sea Beach Line) =

New York City Subway station in Brooklyn

20 Avenue
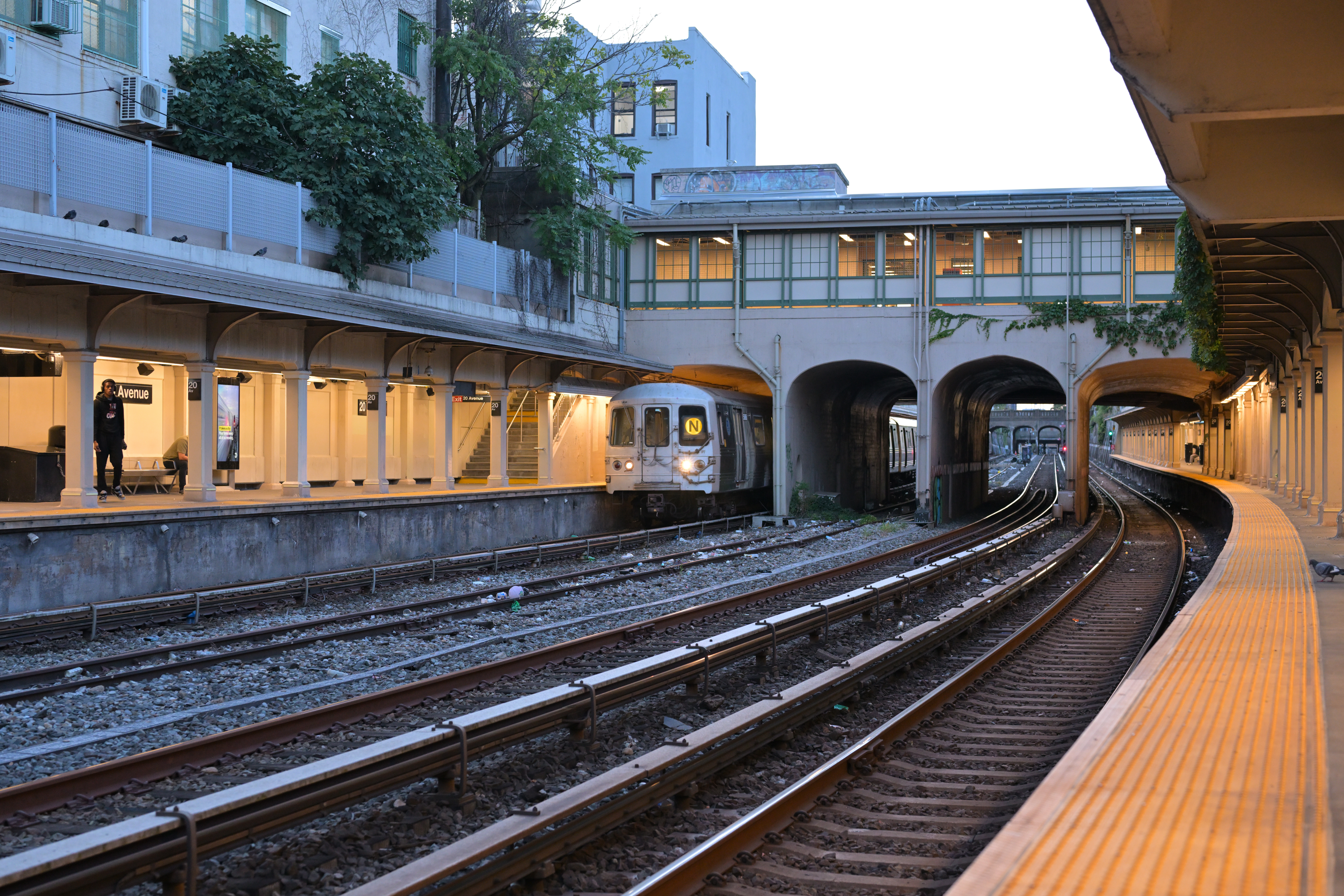
- An R46 N train arrives at 20th Avenue.

Station statistics
- Address: 20th Avenue & 64th Street; Brooklyn, New York
- Borough: Brooklyn
- Locale: Bensonhurst, Mapleton
- Coordinates: 40°37′1.79″N 73°59′5.4″W
- Division: B (BMT)
- Line: BMT Sea Beach Line
- Services: N (all times); W (selected rush-hour trips)
- Structure: Open-cut
- Platforms: 2 side platforms
- Tracks: 4 (2 in regular service)

Other information
- Opened: June 22, 1915 (111 years ago)

Traffic
- 2025: 1,042,118 ▲4.6%
- Rank: 302 out of 423
Services
Preceding station	New York City Subway	Following station
18th Avenue N W toward Astoria–Ditmars Boulevard	Local	Bay Parkway N W toward Coney Island–Stillwell Avenue
Location
Location within New York City Subway
Location within New York City
Location within New York
Track layout
Street map
Station service legend
Symbol	Description
Stops all times	Stops all times
Stops rush hours only	Stops rush hours only
Stops rush hours in the peak direction only	Stops rush hours in the peak direction only

The 20th Avenue station is a local station on the BMT Sea Beach Line of the New York City Subway, located on 20th Avenue between 63rd and 64th Streets in the Mapleton neighborhood of Brooklyn. It is served by the N train at all times. During rush hours, several W trains also serve this station.

== History ==
This station opened on June 22, 1915.

By September 2013, the Coney Island-bound tracks had been replaced with a new trackbed and rubber board protection. From January 18, 2016 to May 22, 2017, the Manhattan-bound platform at this station was closed for renovations. The Coney Island-bound platform was closed from July 31, 2017 to July 1, 2019.

== Station layout ==
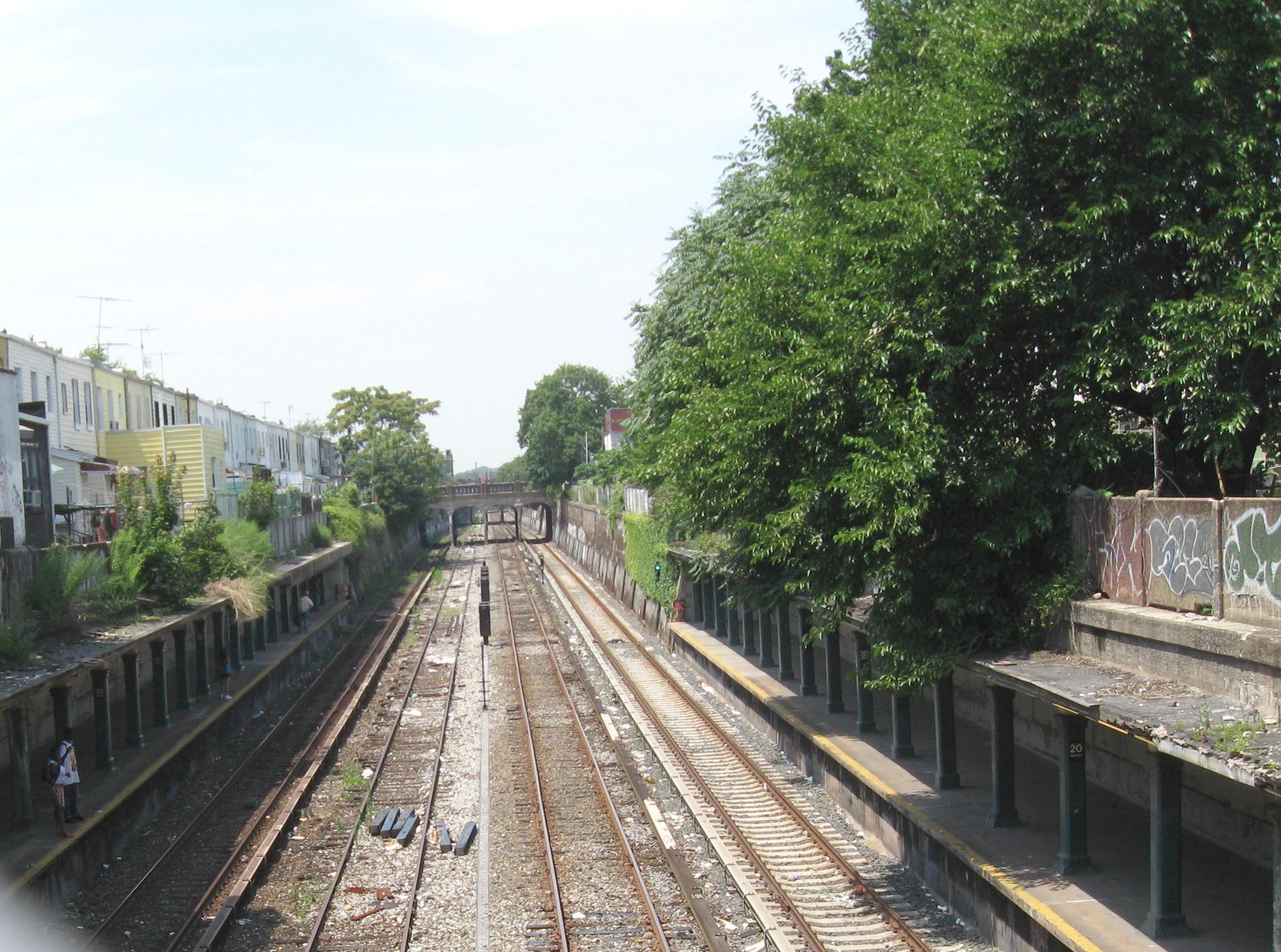
West end of platforms

This open-cut station has four tracks and two side platforms, but the two center express tracks are not normally used. The Coney Island-bound express track has been disconnected from the line and the Manhattan-bound track is signaled for trains in both directions. Both platforms are carved within the Earth's crust and made of concrete. They have beige walls and columns (the columns having previously painted blue-green), and the station signs are the standard black plates in white lettering. There are also some old lights that are out of use, and 1960s-era benches.

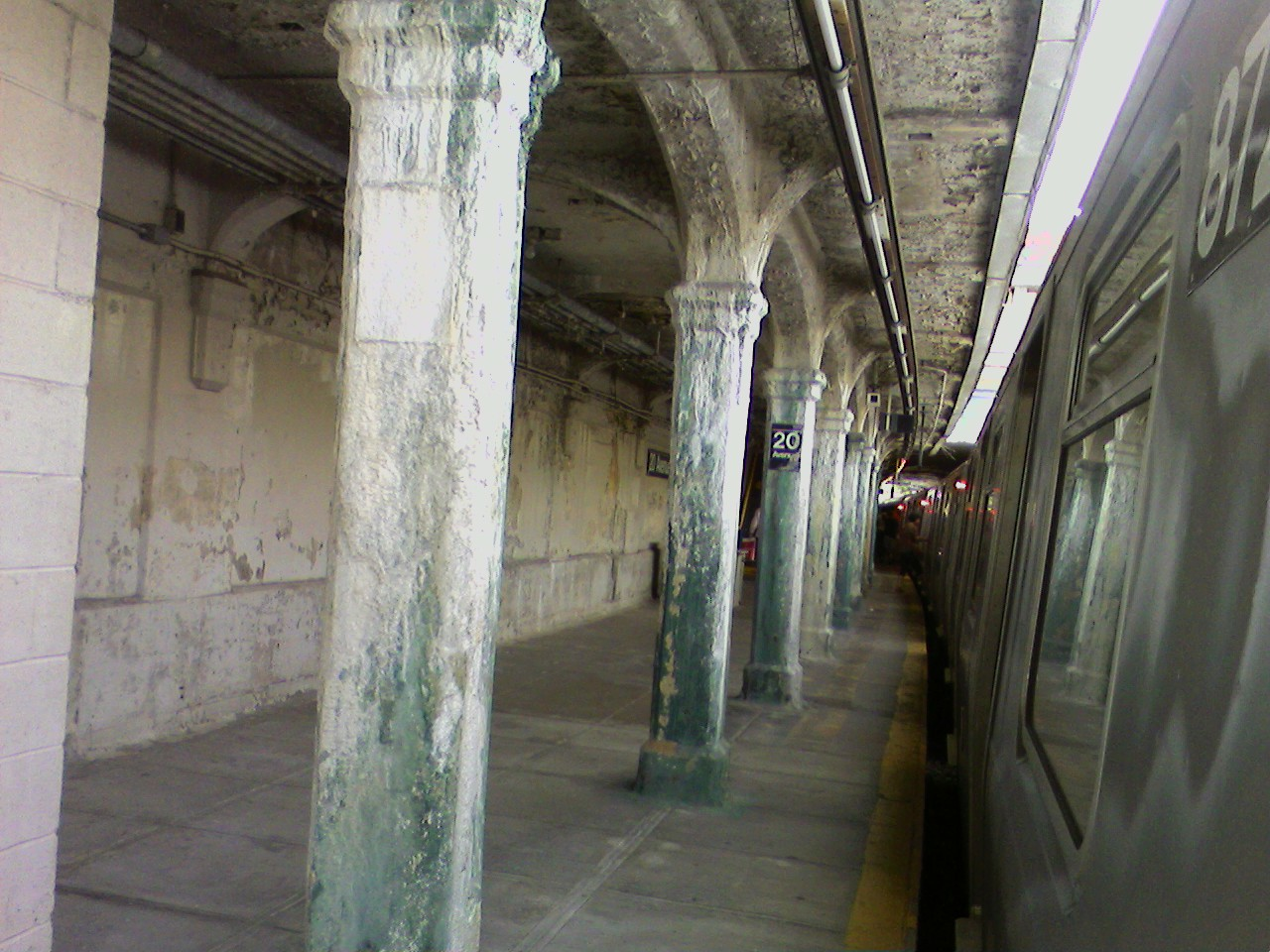
The station had fallen into serious disrepair in the early 2000s

The 2019 artwork here is called Sea City Spin by David Storey. It features abstract glass mosaics based on Storey's experience of riding the BMT Sea Beach Line.

=== Exit ===
This station has one entrance/exit towards the east (railroad south) end. Two staircases from each platform go up to an enclosed concrete crossover before a set of doors lead to the waiting area of the stucco and tile station house. Outside the turnstile bank, there is a token booth and a set of doors leading to the east side of the 20th Avenue overpass/tunnel above the platforms and tracks.
