= 18th Division =

18th Division or 18th Infantry Division may refer to:

== Infantry divisions ==
- 18th Infantry Division (Belgium)
- 18th Infantry Division (France)
- 18th Infantry Division (Wehrmacht), Germany
- 18th Luftwaffe Field Division, Germany
- 18th SS Volunteer Panzergrenadier Division Horst Wessel, Germany
- 18th Volksgrenadier Division, Germany
- 18th Division (German Empire)
- 18th Landwehr Division, German Empire
- 18th Reserve Division, German Empire
- 18th Infantry Division (Greece)
- 18th Division (Imperial Japanese Army)
- 18th Indian Division, a British Indian Army unit during World War I
- 18th Infantry Division "Messina", an Italian unit in World War II
- 18th Division (North Korea)
- 18th Infantry Division (Poland), later the 18th Mechanized Division
- 18th Infantry Division (Russian Empire)
- 18th Guards Motor Rifle Division, Russia
- 18th Division (South Vietnam)
- 18th Mechanized Division (Soviet Union), later the 18th Motor Rifle Division
- 18th Rifle Division, Soviet Union
- 18th (Eastern) Division, a United Kingdom division in World War I
- 18th Infantry Division (United Kingdom), a World War II division
- 18th Division (United States), several formations
- 39th Infantry Division (United States), briefly designated the 18th Division during 1917
- 18th Division (Yugoslav Partisans) (1943–1945)

== Cavalry divisions ==
- 18th Cavalry Division, Soviet Union

== Armoured divisions ==
- 18th Panzer Division (Wehrmacht), Germany
- 18th Tank Division (Soviet Union), part of the 7th Mechanized Corps in World War II
- 18th Armoured Division (Syria)

== Artillery divisions ==
- 18th Artillery Division (Wehrmacht), Germany
- 18th Machine Gun Artillery Division, Soviet Union and Russia
- 18th Artillery Division (Soviet Union), part of the 42nd Army in World War II

== Aviation divisions ==
- 18th Guards Military Transport Aviation Division, Soviet Union
- 18th Strategic Aerospace Division, United States

== Naval divisions ==
- 18th Cruiser Division, Imperial Japanese Navy

== See also ==
- 18th Army (disambiguation)
- XVIII Corps (disambiguation)
- 18th Brigade (disambiguation)
- 18th Regiment (disambiguation)
- 18th Battalion (disambiguation)
- 18th Squadron (disambiguation)
