= 18th Street =

18th Street may refer to:

== Los Angeles ==
- 18th Street gang, an Hispanic street gang

== Manhattan, New York City ==
- 18th Street (IRT Broadway – Seventh Avenue Line); a subway station serving the 1 and 2 trains
- 18th Street (IRT Lexington Avenue Line), an abandoned subway station; formerly serving the 4, 6, and <6> trains
- 18th Street (IRT Third Avenue Line), (demolished)
- 18th Street (IRT Sixth Avenue Line), (demolished)

== Chicago ==
- 18th station, an "L" station
- 18th station (CTA South Side Elevated), a former "L" station
- 18th Street station (Illinois), a station on Metra Electric District

== Washington, D.C. ==
- 18th Street NW (Washington, D.C.)
