= 18th Division (Yugoslav Partisans) =

18th Slovenia Division
- Flag of Democratic Federal Yugoslavia (used by the Partisans)
- Active: 1943–1945
- Country: Democratic Federal Yugoslavia
- Branch: Yugoslav Partisan Army
- Type: Infantry
- Size: ~3,350 (upon formation)
- Part of: 7th Corps
- Engagements: World War II in Yugoslavia

Commanders
- Notable commanders: Rado Pehaček

The 18th Slovenia Division (Slovene: Osemnajsta slovenska divizija, Serbo-Croatian: Osamnaesta slovenačka divizija / Осамнаеста словеначка дивизија) was a Yugoslav Partisan division formed in Zdenska Vas on September 14, 1943. Upon formation it consisted of around 3,350 soldiers in three brigades, those being: the 8th, 9th and 10th Slovenia Brigades. The division was commanded by Rado Pehaček and its political commissar was Janez Hribar - Tone. On October 3, 1943, it became a part of the 7th Corps. The division operated in Slovenia.
