= Eighth Avenue station (BMT Sea Beach Line) =

New York City Subway station in Brooklyn

8 Avenue
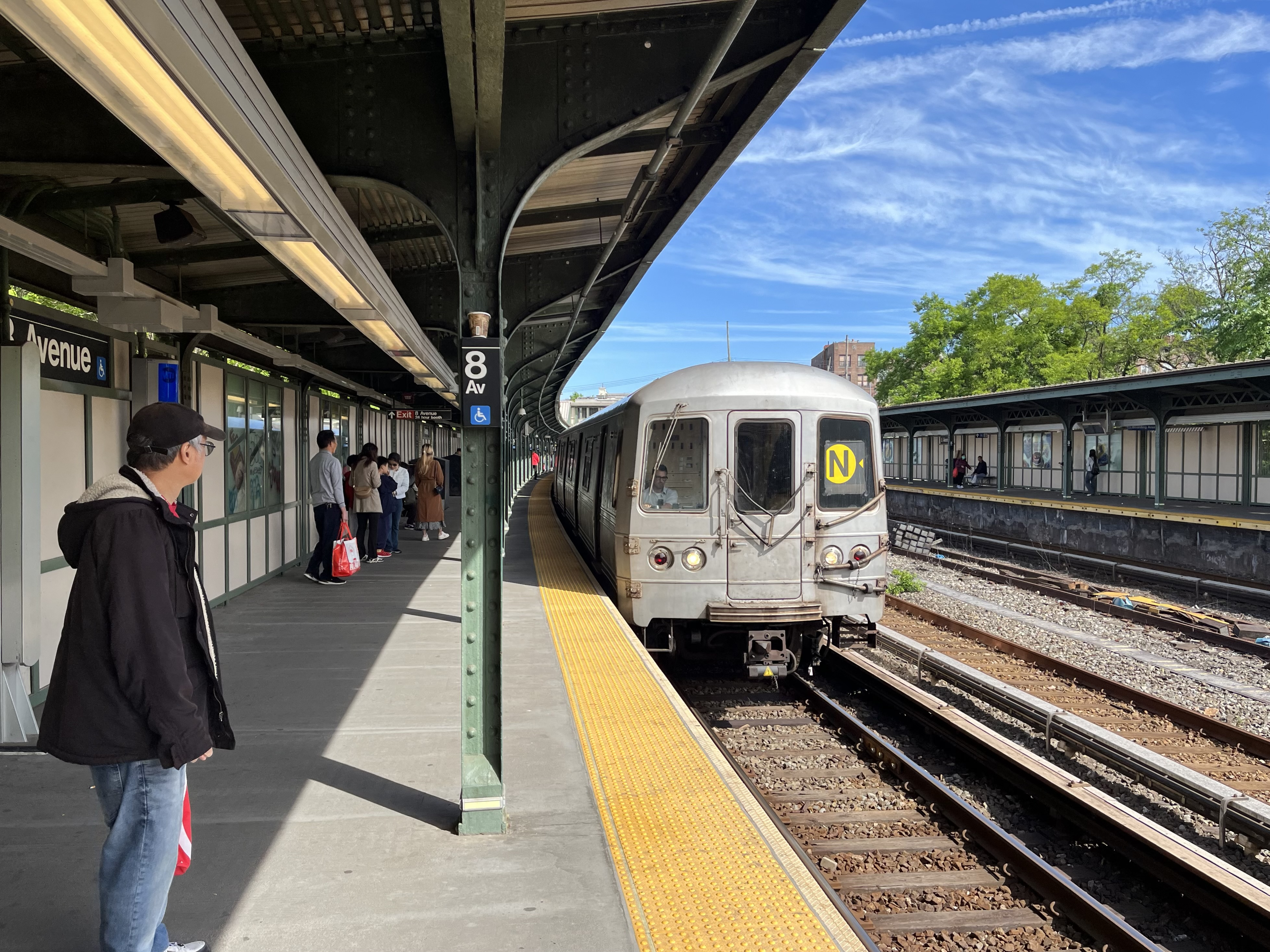
- R46 N train arriving at the northbound platform

Station statistics
- Address: Eighth Avenue & 62nd Street; Brooklyn, New York
- Borough: Brooklyn
- Locale: Sunset Park
- Coordinates: 40°38′4.41″N 74°0′38.5″W
- Division: B (BMT)
- Line: BMT Sea Beach Line
- Services: N (all times); W (selected rush-hour trips)
- Transit: NYCT Bus: B9 (on 60th Street), B70
- Structure: Open-cut / at-grade
- Platforms: 2 side platforms
- Tracks: 4 (2 in regular service)

Other information
- Opened: June 22, 1915; 111 years ago
- Accessible: Yes

Traffic
- 2025: 2,935,590 ▲11.8%
- Rank: 131 out of 423
Services
| Preceding station | New York City Subway | Following station |
|---|---|---|
| 59th Street N W toward Astoria–Ditmars Boulevard | Local | Fort Hamilton Parkway N W toward Coney Island–Stillwell Avenue |
Location
Location within New York City Subway
Location within New York City
Location within New York
Track layout
Street map
Station service legend
| Symbol | Description |
| Stops all times | Stops all times |
| Stops rush hours only | Stops rush hours only |
| Stops rush hours in the peak direction only | Stops rush hours in the peak direction only |

The Eighth Avenue station is a local station on the BMT Sea Beach Line of the New York City Subway. It is located in Sunset Park, Brooklyn, at the intersection of Eighth Avenue and 62nd Street. It is served by the N train at all times. During rush hours, several W trains also serve this station.

Eighth Avenue is the northernmost stop on the Sea Beach Line. West of this station, the tracks curve northward, enter a tunnel, and become the express tracks of the BMT Fourth Avenue Line.

The station serves Lapskaus Boulevard, the largest concentration of Norwegians and Norwegian-Americans in Brooklyn, which is centered on and around Eighth Avenue.

== History ==
This station opened on June 22, 1915.

This station, along with eight others along the Sea Beach Line, was renovated from 2016 to 2019, which initially included installation of two ADA-accessible elevators (original plans were to construct two wheelchair ramps to each platform). The Manhattan-bound platform was closed from January 18, 2016 to May 22, 2017 and a temporary platform was set up on the Coney Island express track for Manhattan-bound service. The Coney Island-bound platform was closed from July 31, 2017 to July 1, 2019. During this time, southbound trains used the northbound express track and the temporary platform.

A project to make the station ADA-accessible was originally expected to be completed in December 2018, but was repeatedly delayed. An elevator to the northbound platform opened on November 4, 2019. Another elevator to the southbound platform was planned to be opened in May 2020. The southbound elevator was not completed, but funding had been committed to completing the elevator. In December 2021, the MTA awarded a contract for the installation of elevators at eight stations, including the Eighth Avenue station's southbound platform. The elevator to the southbound platform finally opened on July 20, 2023.

Plans for the Interborough Express, a light rail line using the Bay Ridge Branch right of way, were announced in 2023. As part of the project, a light rail station at Eighth Avenue has been proposed next to the existing subway station.

== Station layout ==
This open-cut station has four tracks and two side platforms, but the two center express tracks are not normally used. The Coney Island-bound track has been disconnected from the line and the Manhattan-bound track is signaled for trains in both directions. The platforms have windscreens with beige panels. The platforms have brown canopies with green support columns and frames. The station signs are at the standard black name plate in white Helvetica lettering.

The LIRR Bay Ridge Branch crosses underneath and is visible from the north end of the station.

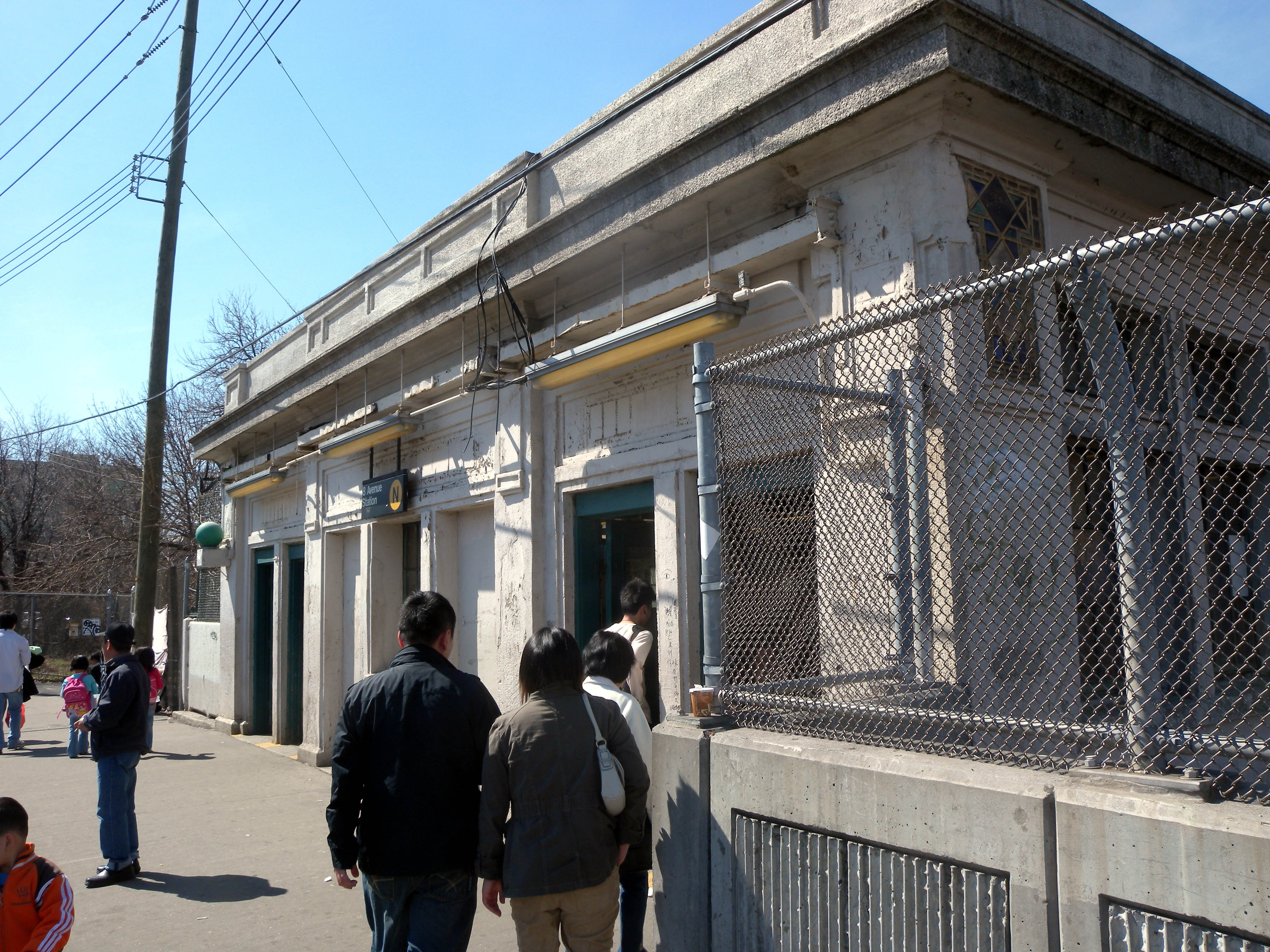
Eighth Avenue station house prior to renovation

This is the northernmost station on the Sea Beach Line. North of here, the Coney Island-bound express track dead ends while the Manhattan-bound express track merges with the local tracks as the line curves north and enters the tunnel into the BMT Fourth Avenue Line.

=== Exits ===
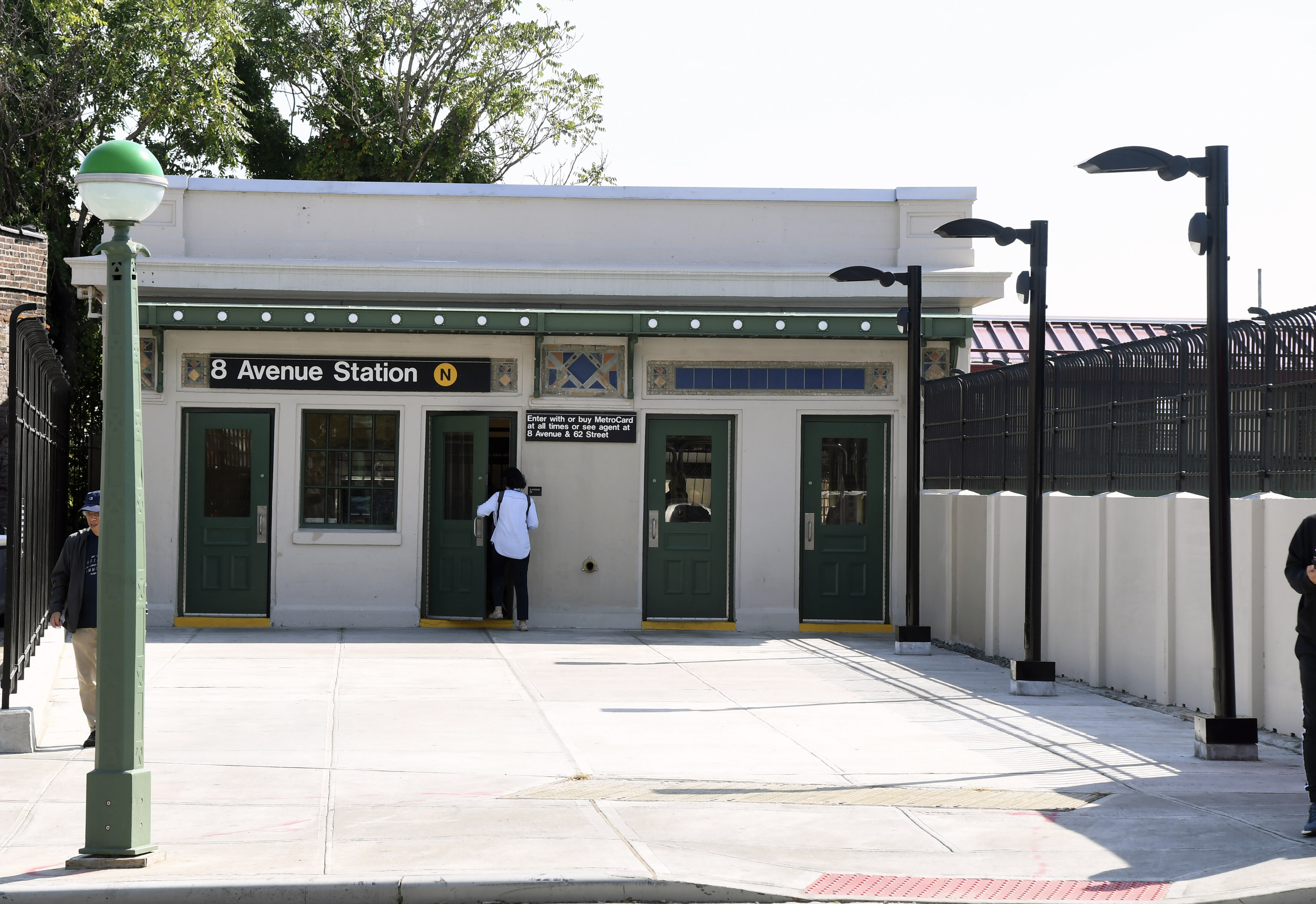
Seventh Avenue station house following renovation, 2019

The station has an entrance at the extreme east (railroad south) end, which is a beige street-level station house on the Eighth Avenue overpass at 62nd Street above the platforms and tracks. A single staircase from each platform goes up to a crossover, where a set of doors lead to the waiting area above the station house. A turnstile bank leads to the token booth and exit doors.

The station also has an entrance at the extreme west (railroad north) end, with two staircases from each platform leading up to Seventh Avenue and 62nd Street. In the past, it was closed due to high crime and repurposed into a maintenance shop. The staircases and overpass above the tracks remained intact, and the entrances were reopened in February 2019 as part of the reconstruction of this station.
