= 18th Infantry Brigade =

18th Infantry Brigade may refer to:

- 18th Infantry Brigade (United Kingdom)
- 18th Brigade (Australia)
- 18th Indian Infantry Brigade
