= 18th Avenue station (BMT Sea Beach Line) =

New York City Subway station in Brooklyn

18 Avenue
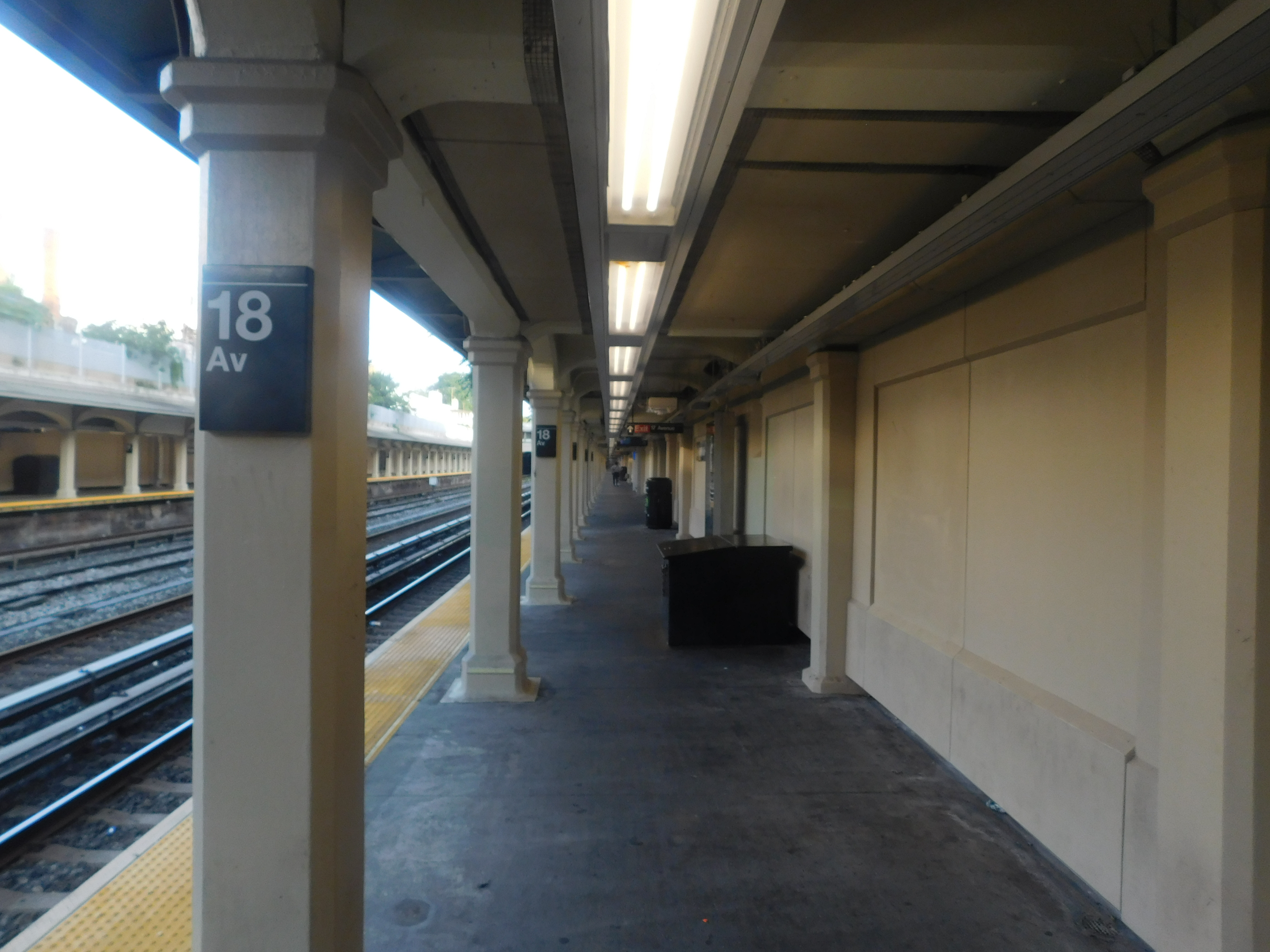
- Northbound platform

Station statistics
- Address: 18th Avenue & 64th Street; Brooklyn, New York
- Borough: Brooklyn
- Locale: Bensonhurst, Mapleton
- Coordinates: 40°37′12.07″N 73°59′22″W
- Division: B (BMT)
- Line: BMT Sea Beach Line
- Services: N (all times); W (selected rush-hour trips)
- Transit: NYCT Bus: B8
- Structure: Open-cut
- Platforms: 2 side platforms
- Tracks: 4 (2 in regular service)

Other information
- Opened: June 22, 1915 (111 years ago)

Traffic
- 2025: 1,241,122 ▲8.1%
- Rank: 271 out of 423
Services
Preceding station	New York City Subway	Following station
New Utrecht Avenue N W toward Astoria–Ditmars Boulevard	Local	20th Avenue N W toward Coney Island–Stillwell Avenue
Location
Location within New York City Subway
Location within New York City
Location within New York
Track layout
Street map
Station service legend
Symbol	Description
Stops all times	Stops all times
Stops rush hours only	Stops rush hours only
Stops rush hours in the peak direction only	Stops rush hours in the peak direction only

The 18th Avenue station is a local station on the BMT Sea Beach Line of the New York City Subway, located at the intersection of 18th Avenue and 64th Street in Mapleton, Brooklyn. It is served by the N train at all times. During rush hours, several W trains also serve this station.

== History ==
This station opened on June 22, 1915.

This station was renovated between 2016 and 2019. From January 18, 2016 to May 22, 2017, the Manhattan-bound platform at this station was closed for renovations. The Coney Island-bound platform was closed from July 31, 2017 to July 1, 2019.

== Station layout ==
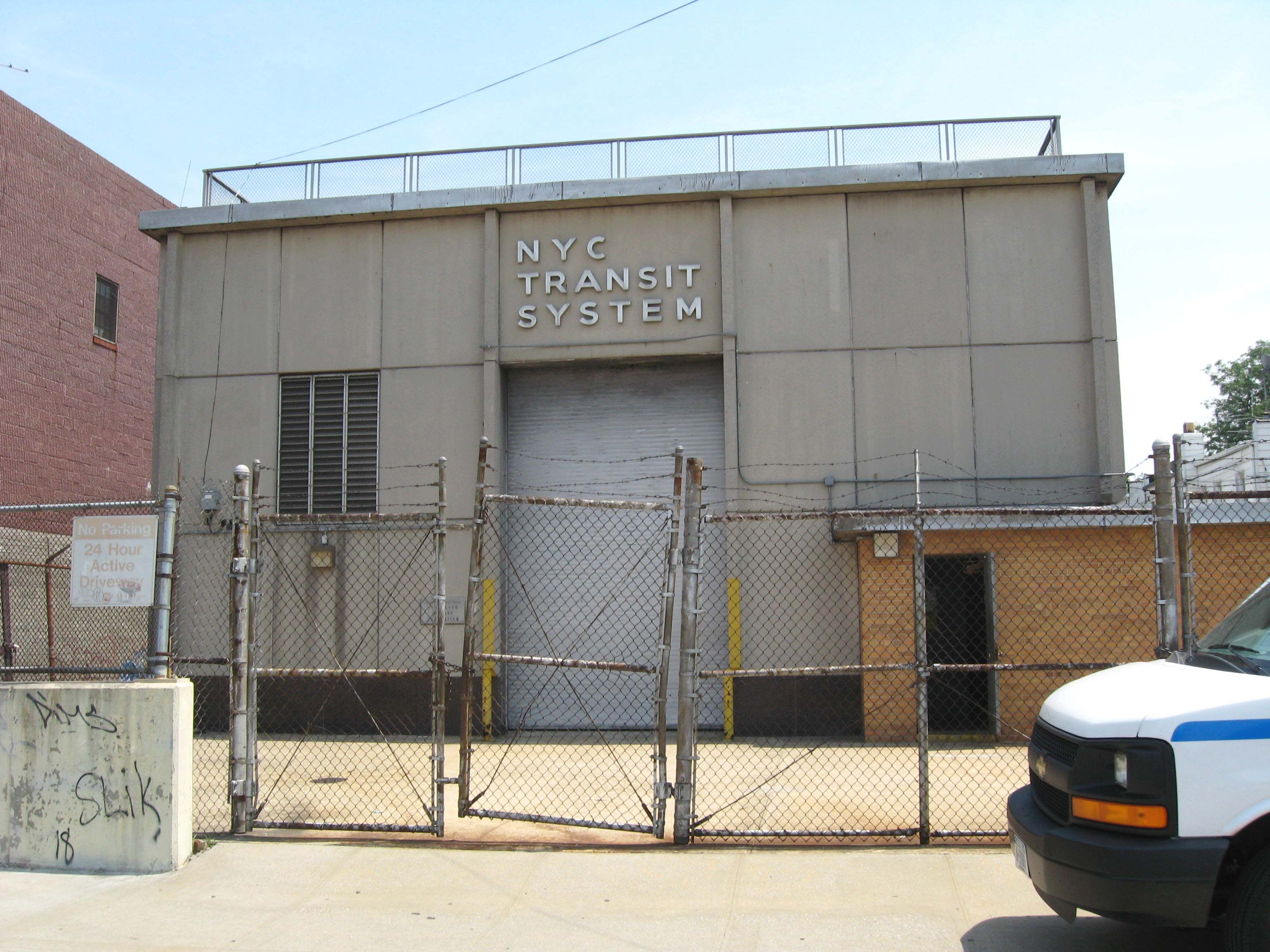
16th Avenue Powerhouse north of the station

This open-cut station has four tracks and two side platforms, but the two center express tracks are not normally used. The Coney Island-bound express track has been disconnected from the line and the Manhattan-bound express track is signaled for trains in both directions. Both platforms are made of concrete and have beige (previously blue-green) rectangular columns running along them at regular intervals, alternating ones having the standard black name plate with white lettering. The platform walls are also beige.

The 2019 artwork here is called Fluxus/Rythmus by Emilio Perez. It features 22 glass mosaic panels, with forms inspired by movement and the energy of the neighborhood of the station.

=== Exits ===
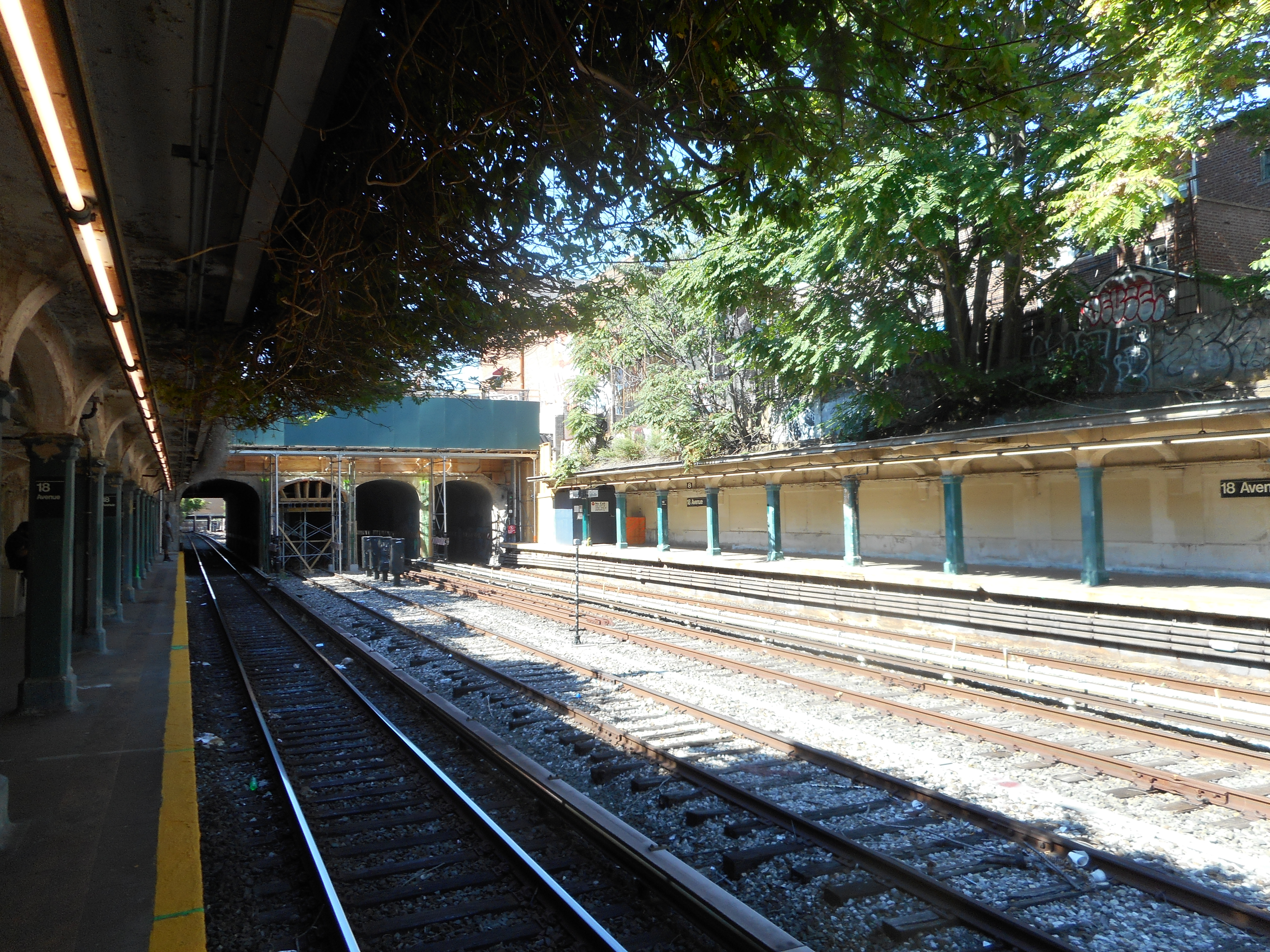
Station view in 2015, prior to renovation

This station has two fare control areas, one at each end of the platforms. The full-time side is at the east (railroad south) end. A single staircase from each platform goes up to a metal crossover, where a short staircase goes up to a set of doors that lead to the station house's waiting area. A turnstile bank provides access to and from the station. Outside fare control, there is a token booth and doors leading to the west side of 18th Avenue between 63rd and 64th Streets. The station house is shared with several businesses.

On the west (railroad north) end of the station, one staircase from each platform goes up to a metal crossover, where a set of doors lead to an un-staffed station house with one exit only turnstile and one High Entry/Exit Turnstile providing access to and from the station. The doors lead to the west side of 17th Avenue between 63rd and 64th Streets.
