= BMT Sea Beach Line =

New York City Subway line

- The N train serves the entire Sea Beach Line at all times. Limited rush-hour service is also provided by the W train.

Overview
- Owner: City of New York
- Locale: Brooklyn, New York City
- Termini: Eighth Avenue; Coney Island–Stillwell Avenue
- Stations: 10

Service
- Type: Rapid transit
- System: New York City Subway
- Operator(s): New York City Transit Authority
- Daily ridership: 45,909 (2023)

History
- Opened: June 22, 1915; 110 years ago
- Last extension: 1918

Technical
- Number of tracks: 2–4
- Character: Open-Cut /At-Grade ( Coney Island Yard stretch ) /Elevated (at Stillwell Avenue)
- Track gauge: 4 ft 8 1/2 in (1,435 mm)
- Electrification: 600V DC third rail

The BMT Sea Beach Line is a rapid transit line of the BMT division of the New York City Subway, connecting the BMT Fourth Avenue Line at 59th Street via a four-track wide open cut to Coney Island in Brooklyn. It has at times hosted the fastest express service between Manhattan and Coney Island, since there are no express stations along the entire stretch, but now carries only local trains on the N service, which serves the entire line at all times. During rush hours, several W trains serve the line north of 86th Street.

== Extent and service ==
The following services use part or all of the BMT Sea Beach Line:

	Time period	Section of line
"N" train	all times	full line
"W" train	five rush-hour trains	north of 86th Street

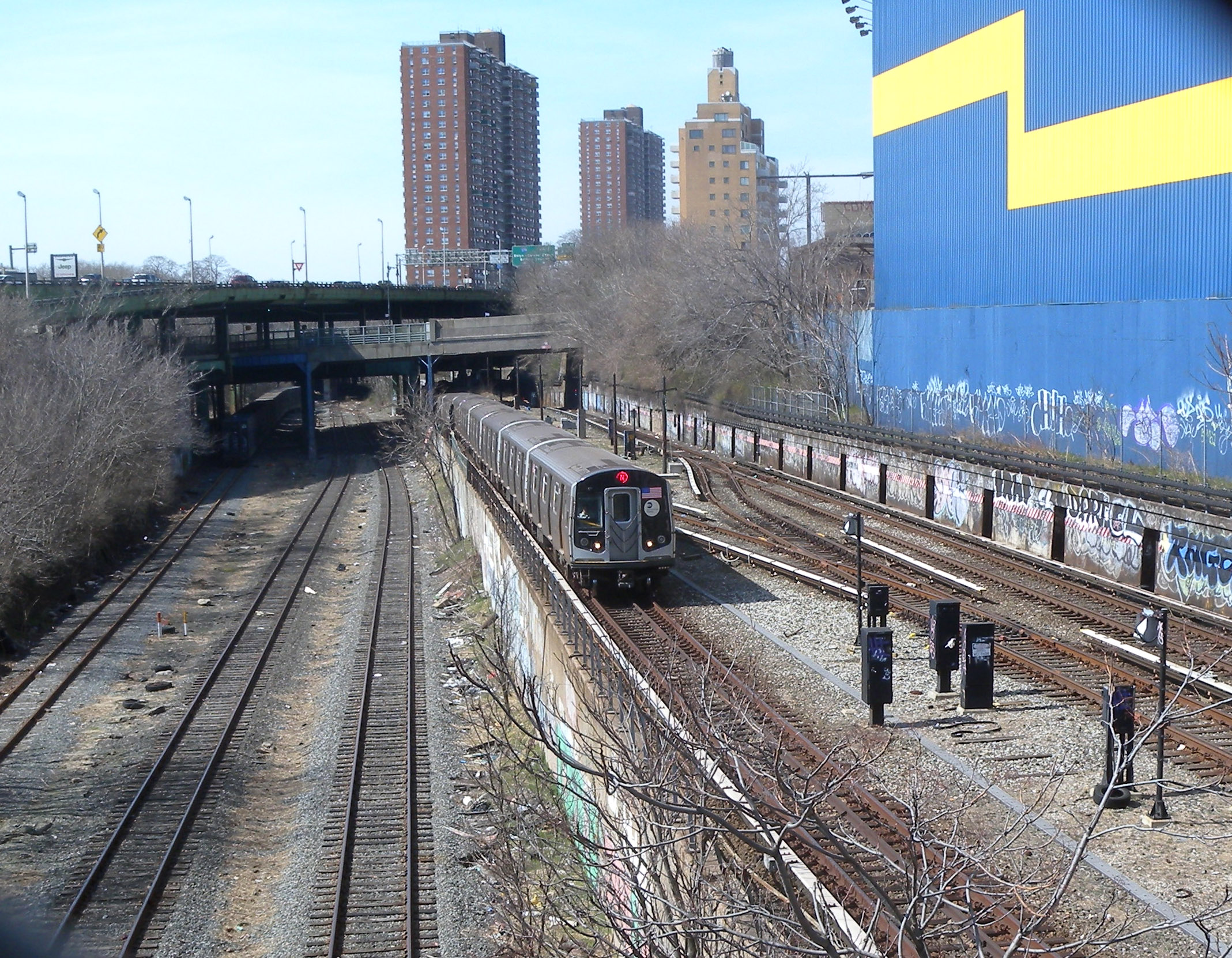
Open cut, looking west from 6th Avenue overpass, with the LIRR Bay Ridge Branch on the left and the BMT Sea Beach Line on the right.

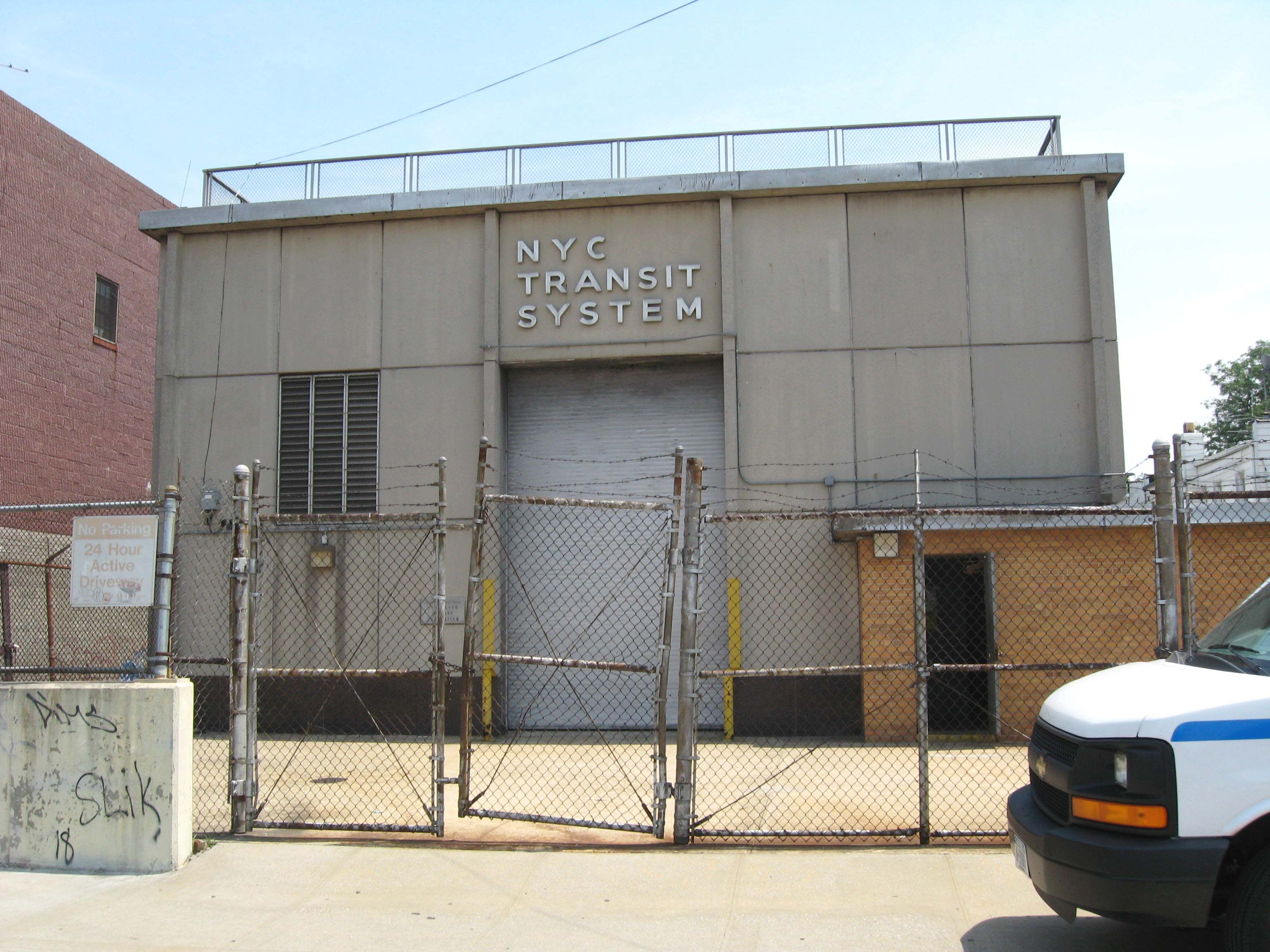
16th Avenue powerhouse

=== Route description ===
The modern line begins as a split from the BMT Fourth Avenue Line at a flying junction immediately south of 59th Street. Between the station and the split, crossover switches are provided between the local and express tracks of the Fourth Avenue Line, and then the express tracks curve east under the northbound local track to become the beginning of the Sea Beach Line. After emerging from the tunnel under Fourth Avenue, the two separate Sea Beach tracks rise on either side of a ramp which formerly connected to the original line to the Brooklyn shore at 65th Street in Bay Ridge.

After passing the former junction with the line to the shore, the Sea Beach widens to the width of four tracks. All stations have two side platforms with no platform access to the express tracks anywhere on the Sea Beach right-of-way.

Before and after Kings Highway, there are crossover switches to the southbound express track from the northbound express track. On both sides of Kings Highway, crossovers exist to allow express trains to switch to the local tracks before the station or local trains to switch to express after the station. The express tracks end south of 86th Street as the line becomes double-tracked, and cut diagonally adjacent to the Coney Island Yards. After several yard connections, the line ends at the Coney Island–Stillwell Avenue terminal.

=== Express tracks ===
The express tracks were originally intended to host the Coney Island Express. Service was carried on these tracks twice in the line's history — for summer weekend service to Chambers Street from 1924 to 1952 and again from 1967–1968 to provide a fast rush-hour Broadway Line express service for Coney Island riders (NX). Though these expresses are thought of as being Sea Beach Expresses, they did not serve a single station on the Sea Beach Line.

The express tracks on the Sea Beach had other uses over the years. Most new equipment, especially experimental cars, was broken in on these tracks. The tracks were used for motorman training and set up with a short stretch of 1950s-era automation to test the ill-fated system later used on one track of the IRT 42nd Street Shuttle.

Historically, the two express tracks were an absolute block, that is, there was no signal control between one end of the tracks near Sixth Avenue and Kings Highway. A train was not supposed to enter the block until any train in front of it had departed the block.

The express tracks' section on this block was allowed to deteriorate severely as did much of the system from the 1970s on. In 1998, it was decided to rehabilitate the express tracks in this area, with full signaling. Only the northbound (E4) track was rehabilitated, however, for two-way traffic from its northern end to Kings Highway if needed. The southbound (E3) track remains unused, being disconnected from the other three tracks and inaccessible from 59th Street to Kings Highway.

== History ==
=== Early history ===
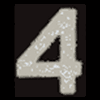
Route designation on BMT Triplex equipment

The New York and Sea Beach Railroad was organized on September 25, 1876, as a steam-powered excursion railroad. It opened from a junction with the Brooklyn, Bath and Coney Island Railroad (West End Line) and concurrently-opened New York, Bay Ridge and Jamaica Railroad (Manhattan Beach Line) to Coney Island on July 18, 1877. After a delay of two years, it was opened to the Bay Ridge Ferry (to South Ferry, Manhattan) on July 17, 1879, at which time the Sea Beach Palace opened at the Coney Island end.

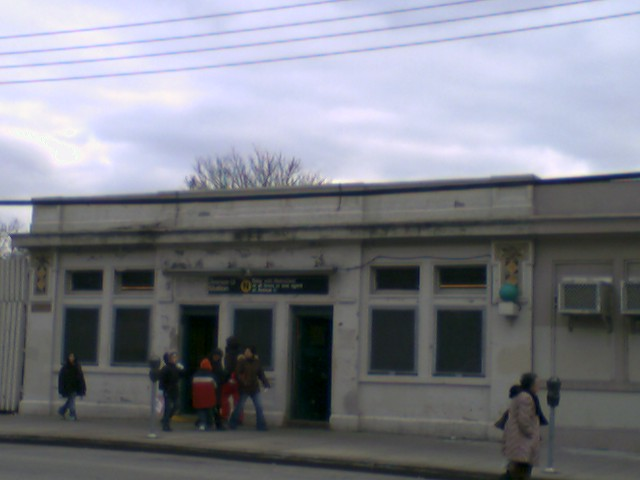
Station headhouse at Avenue U station, pre-renovation

Except at its two ends, the railroad used the same route as the current Sea Beach Line. At the Bay Ridge end, the railroad ran just north of the Long Island Rail Road's Bay Ridge Branch, ending at the Bay Ridge Channel around 64th Street. The current line joins this alignment near Fifth Avenue. The old railroad crossed the Bay Ridge Branch with a pronounced S-curve just east of Seventh Avenue; the crossing is now much straighter with the Bay Ridge Branch in a deeper cut. On the Coney Island end, the original path curved left soon after the curve to the right at the northern edge of the Coney Island Yards, ending at the combined Sea Beach Palace hotel and depot, on the north side of the BMT Brighton Line at around West 10th Street.

On May 22, 1883, the company was reorganized as the New York and Sea Beach Railway Company and was allowed to operate from New York Harbor to the Sea Beach Palace in Coney Island. The company went bankrupt, and a receiver was appointed on January 15, 1896, before the company was sold at foreclosure by the Sea Beach Railway, which was incorporated on August 29, 1896. The Brooklyn Rapid Transit Company (BRT) bought the company's stock on November 5, 1897, along with the short elevated Sea View Railway on Coney Island, and assigned it by lease to the Brooklyn Heights Railroad. It was soon fitted with trolley wire for electric operation. A March 1, 1907, agreement allowed the company to operate through service from 38th Street and New Utrecht Avenue to Coney Island. Starting around 1908, electric trains began operating as a branch of the BMT West End Line from Bath Junction to Coney Island, with trains coming from Park Row in Manhattan via the Brooklyn Bridge and BMT Fifth Avenue Line. Streetcars ran over the rest of the line to Bay Ridge, from New Utrecht Avenue and 62nd Street to 65th Street and Third Avenue. In 1907, connecting tracks were built connecting to the West End Line just north of Coney Island Creek in order to bring Sea Beach trains into West End Depot. The original alignment was retained for freight service only.

The portion of the line between 62nd Street and New Utrecht Avenue and Third Avenue and 65th Street was replaced by bus service between December 1, 1913, and June 23, 1914, when trolley service resumed service before being eliminated on June 22, 1915.

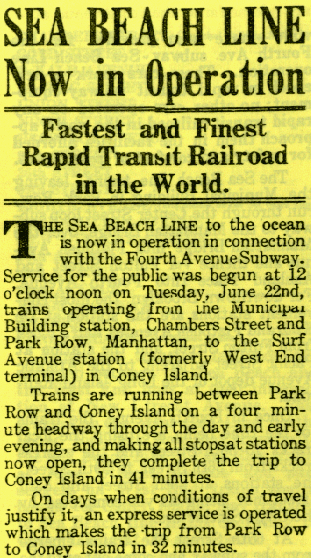
Part of a 1915 brochure for the line

As part of the Dual Contracts, and while the Fourth Avenue Subway Line was being constructed the BRT dug a four-track open cut and built high-level platforms for subway operation on the Sea Beach Line. Trolley cars started using the new open cut between Avenue T and 86th Street on January 9, 1914. Service was gradually extended until the new Sea Beach Line opened for full subway service. Two subway cars with poles were run between Third Avenue and New Utrecht Avenue and started operating on March 16, 1915. Additional cars were equipped with poles and operated service on the line from May 1, 1915, until the line opened for full subway service on June 22, 1915, with trains running between Coney Island and Chambers Street in Lower Manhattan. Service started with two- and three-car trains operating via the Fourth Avenue local track and the Manhattan Bridge south tracks. The express tracks were finished several weeks later. When the BMT Fourth Avenue Line was extended south from the Sea Beach Line on January 15, 1916, the Sea Beach trains were shifted to the express tracks on Fourth Avenue, with Fourth Avenue trains providing local service.

The tracks over the north side of the Manhattan Bridge opened on September 4, 1917, along with part of the BMT Broadway Line. All Sea Beach service was moved to the new line, ending at 14th Street–Union Square. This was extended to Times Square–42nd Street on January 5, 1918.

In 1924, the BMT assigned numbers to its services. The Sea Beach Line service became the 4. This has since become the N train. In general, Sea Beach service has always run express in Manhattan and on Fourth Avenue in Brooklyn, ending at 42nd Street and later 57th Street. The NX began on November 27, 1967, as a "super-express" from Brighton Beach on the BMT Brighton Line through Coney Island–Stillwell Avenue, and along the Sea Beach Line express tracks to 57th Street with only seven stops between Stillwell Avenue and 57th Street, three in Brooklyn and four in Manhattan. This service was discontinued on April 15, 1968, due to low ridership, and no regular trains have used the Sea Beach express tracks since.

=== Later years ===
In the 1970s, there was a proposal to renovate the Sea Beach open cut, which was deteriorating to the point that a retaining wall along the line was in danger of collapsing onto the tracks. Funding was allocated for the line's infrastructure improvements in 1975. More than $20 million was earmarked for New York City Subway projects in 1977, including for upgrades to the Sea Beach line.

In 1986, the New York City Transit Authority launched a study to determine whether to close 79 stations on 11 routes, including the entire Sea Beach Line, due to low ridership and high repair costs. Numerous figures, including New York City Council member Carol Greitzer, criticized the plans.

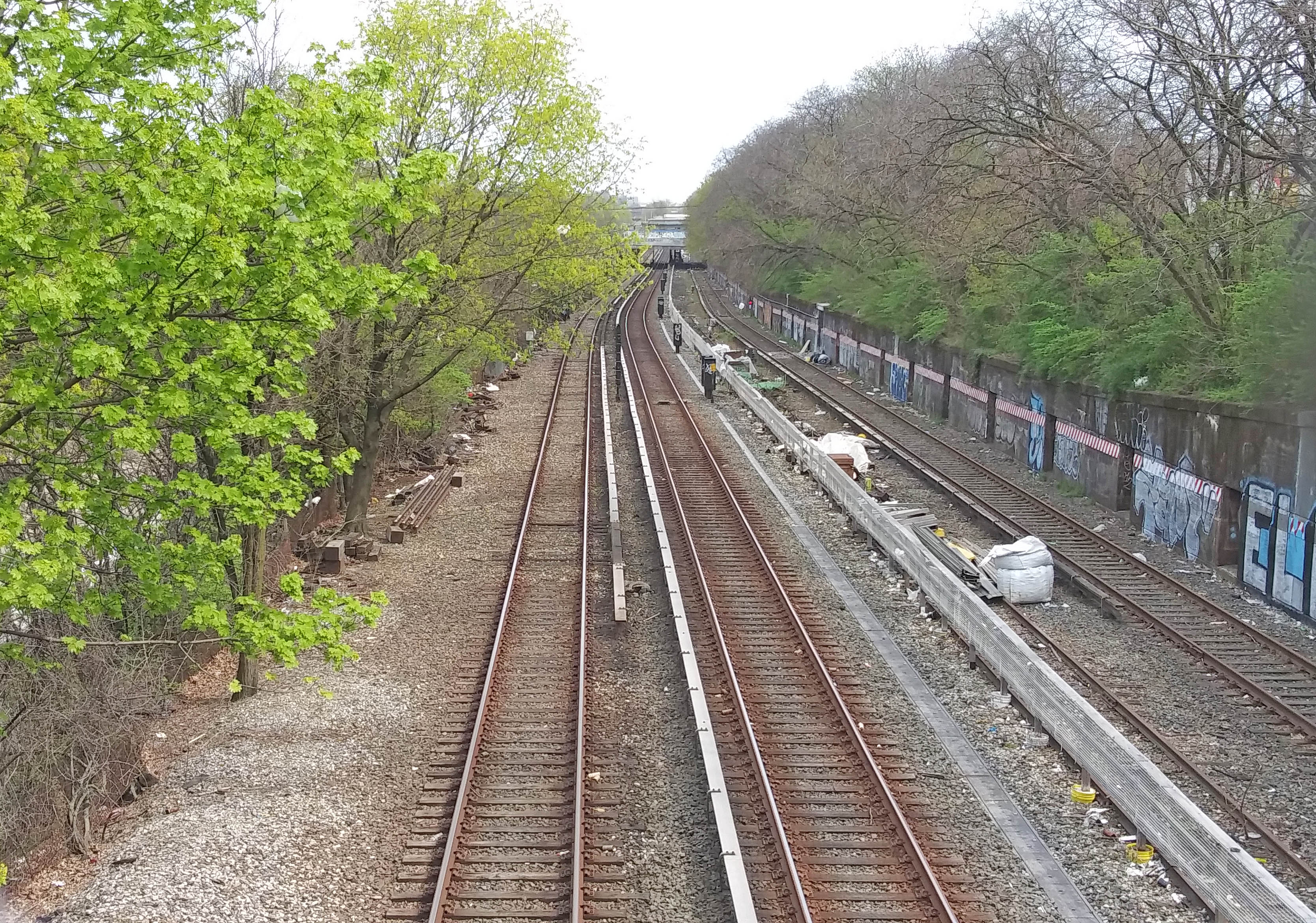
BMT Sea Beach line passes through South Brooklyn

When Coney Island–Stillwell Avenue was closed for reconstruction from 1993 to 1995 and November 4, 2001, to May 29, 2005, 86th Street was the southern terminal for the N train.

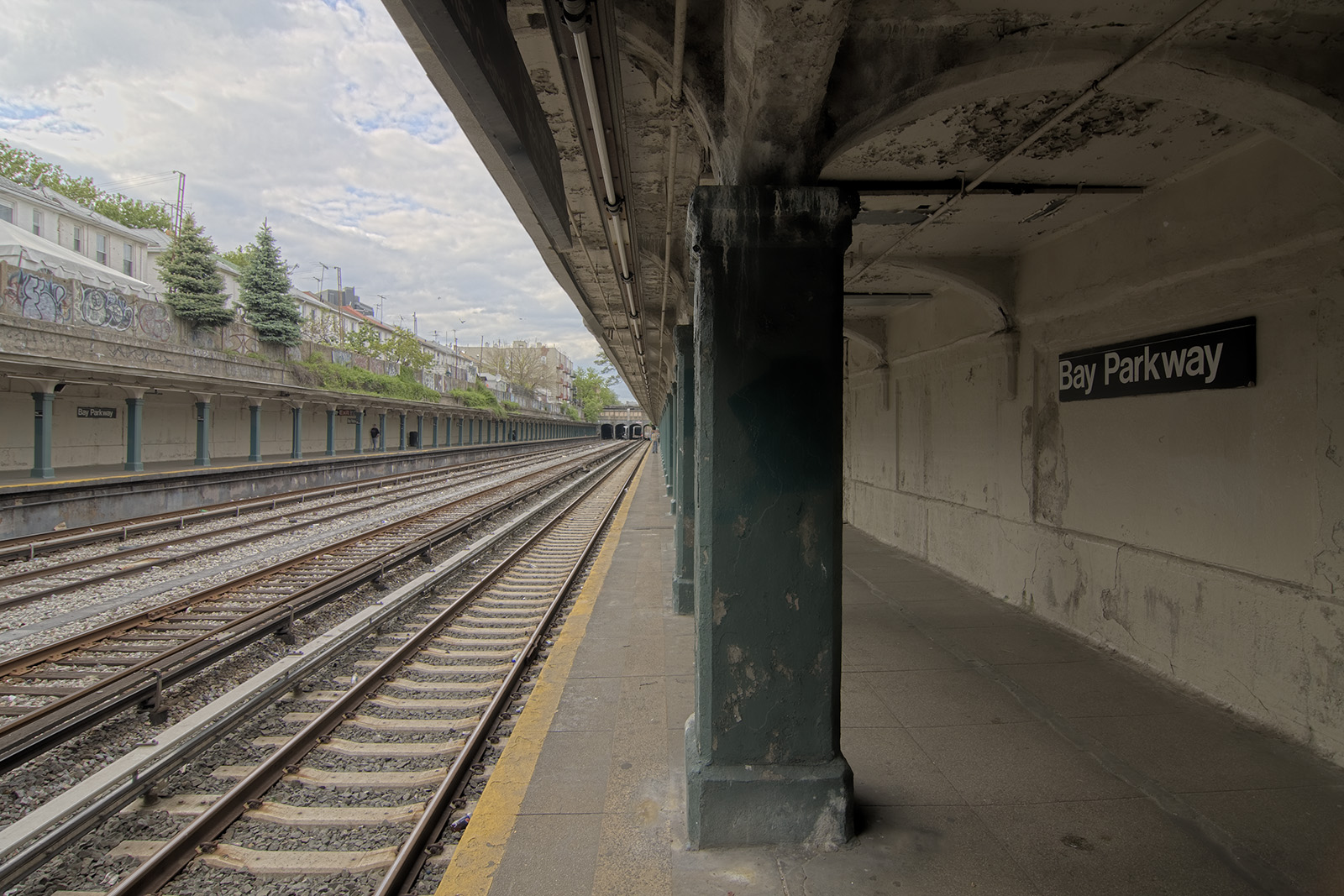
Bay Parkway pre-renovation

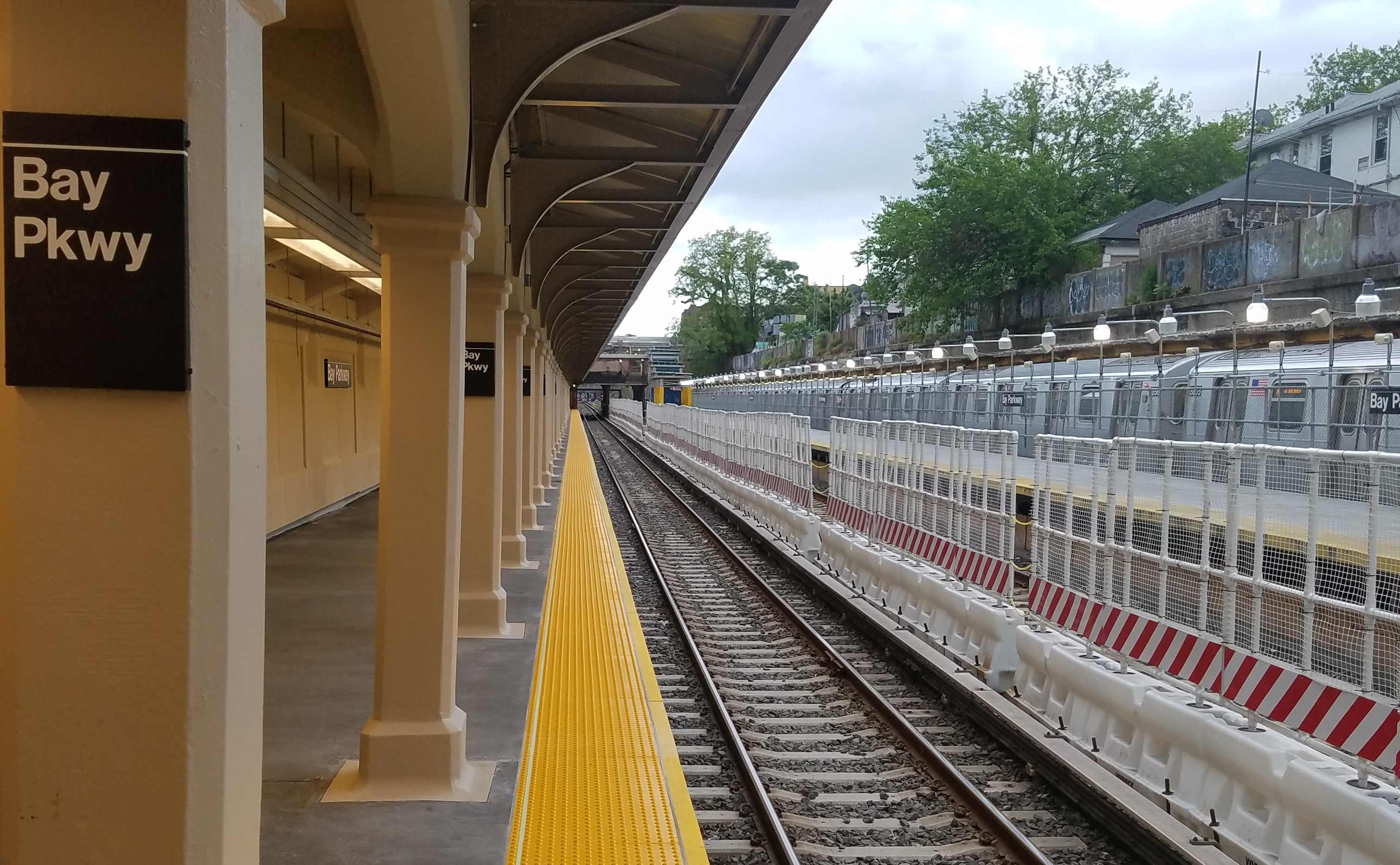
Bay Parkway post-renovation

In October 2013, it was announced that the line would undergo extensive renovation. All stations would be waterproofed, with their houses and passageways remodeled and stairways rebuilt; they would also get Help Points, and turnstiles would be added to each station. In addition, graffiti, which is prevalent on the line, would be mitigated; this required going onto private property to remove graffiti and fix the roofs of the stations. Eighth Avenue and New Utrecht Avenue/62nd Street would get wheelchair-accessible elevators. The $395,700,000 project was scheduled to begin in the winter of 2015, but work began in late June 2015.

Funding for the renovation was provided for in the 2010–2014 Capital Program. From January 18, 2016, to May 22, 2017, the Manhattan-bound platforms of all stations were closed. At Bay Parkway and Eighth Avenue, temporary wooden platforms were placed on the southbound express trackbed. After a two-month halt in construction, the Coney Island bound platforms closed on July 31, 2017. The southbound platforms at Kings Highway, Avenue U, and 86th Street reopened on October 29, 2018, with closures lasting a month less than for their northbound counterparts. The southbound platforms between Eighth Avenue and Bay Parkway, however, were closed until July 1, 2019, six months longer than their northern counterparts and seven months longer than the other three southbound platforms. The elevators at New Utrecht Avenue/62nd Street opened on July 19, 2019. The northbound elevator at Eighth Avenue opened on November 4, 2019, with the southbound elevator opening on July 30, 2023. From October 21, 2019, until April 27, 2020, N trains terminated at 86th Street so work could be completed to protect Coney Island Yard from flooding. An out-of-system transfer was made available between the N at 86th Street and the F at Avenue X station.

== Station listing ==
Station service legend
Stops all times	Stops 24 hours a day
Stops rush hours only	Stops during weekday rush hours only
Time period details
Disabled access	Station is compliant with the Americans with Disabilities Act
↑	Station is compliant with the Americans with Disabilities Act in the indicated direction only
↓	Station is compliant with the Americans with Disabilities Act in the indicated direction only
	Elevator access to mezzanine only

Neighborhood	Disabled access	Station	Tracks	Services	Opened	Transfers and notes
splits from the BMT Fourth Avenue Line (N W )
Two center express tracks begin (no regular service) (Southbound track disconnected from line; northbound track bi-directional)
Sunset Park	Disabled access	Eighth Avenue	local	N W	June 22, 1915	
Borough Park		Fort Hamilton Parkway	local	N W	June 22, 1915	
Borough Park	Disabled access	New Utrecht Avenue	local	N W	June 22, 1915	BMT West End Line (D R W ) at 62nd Street
Mapleton		18th Avenue	local	N W	June 22, 1915	
Mapleton		20th Avenue	local	N W	June 22, 1915	
Bensonhurst		Bay Parkway	local	N W	June 22, 1915	
Southbound express track reconnects to line (no regular service)
Gravesend		Kings Highway	local	N W	June 22, 1915	B82 Select Bus Service
Gravesend		Avenue U	local	N W	June 22, 1915	
Gravesend		86th Street	local	N W	June 22, 1915	
Center express tracks end
connecting tracks to Coney Island Yard
Coney Island	Disabled access	Coney Island–Stillwell Avenue	all	N	December 13, 1918	BMT Brighton Line (Q ) IND Culver Line (F <F>); BMT West End Line (D )
