= 18th Vermont Infantry Regiment =

- Active: 1865
- Country: United States
- Allegiance: Union
- Branch: Infantry
- Size: Regiment
- Engagements: American Civil War

The 18th Vermont Infantry Regiment was an infantry regiment from Vermont that failed to complete its organization to serve in the Union Army during the American Civil War.
