= 18th Cruiser Division =

18th Cruiser Division 第十八戦隊 (Dai-Jūhachi Sentai)
- Active: 1940-1942; 1944-1945
- Country: Japan
- Part of: 8th Fleet; 7th Fleet; General Escort Command

The 18th Cruiser Division (CruDiv 18, 第十八戦隊, Dai-Jūhachi Sentai) was a cruiser unit of the Imperial Japanese Navy. The division was part of the 4th Fleet and consisted of the light cruisers Tenryū and Tatsuta.

== Organization ==
- This article handles all Dai-Jūhachi Sentai collectively.

Date	Higher unit	Vessels
1 May 1940 (original)	4th Fleet	Cruiser Tama, Minelayer Tokiwa
15 November 1940	4th Fleet	Cruiser Kashima, Tenryū, Tatsuta
1 December 1941	4th Fleet	Cruiser Tenryū, Tatsuta
14 July 1942	8th Fleet	Cruiser Tenryū, Tatsuta
10 December 1942	disbanded	
20 January 1944	General Escort Command	Minelayer Tokiwa, C.M. Cruiser Saigon Maru, C.M. Minelayer Sinkō Maru, Kōei Maru
5 November 1944	General Escort Command	Minelayer Tokiwa, C.M. Minelayer Kōei Maru, C.M. Gunboat Chōhakusan Maru
10 April 1945	7th Fleet	Minelayer Tokiwa, C.M. Minelayer Kōei Maru, Eijō Maru
1 October 1945	dissolved	

== Commanding officers ==
- This article handles all Dai-Jūhachi Sentai collectively.

	Rank	Name	Date	Note, additional post
1	Rear-Admiral	Rokuzō Sugiyama	1 May 1940	
2	Vice-Admiral	Mitsumi Shimizu	15 November 1940	Commander of the 3rd China Expeditionary Fleet
3	Vice-Admiral	Rokuzō Sugiyama	5 July 1941	Commander of the 3rd China Expeditionary Fleet
4	Rear-Admiral	Kuninori Marumo	1 December 1941	
5	Rear-Admiral	Sadamichi Kajioka	14 July 1942	
6	Rear-Admiral	Mitsuharu Matsuyama	1 September 1942	
x		disbanded	10 December 1942	
7	Rear-Admiral	Seiji Mizui	20 January 1944	
8	Vice-Admiral	Fukuji Kishi	5 June 1945	Commander of the 7th Fleet
9	Vice-Admiral	Sentarō Ōmori	20 August 1945	Commander of the 7th Fleet
x		vacant post	15 September 1945	
