= Avenue U station (BMT Sea Beach Line) =

New York City Subway station in Brooklyn

Avenue U
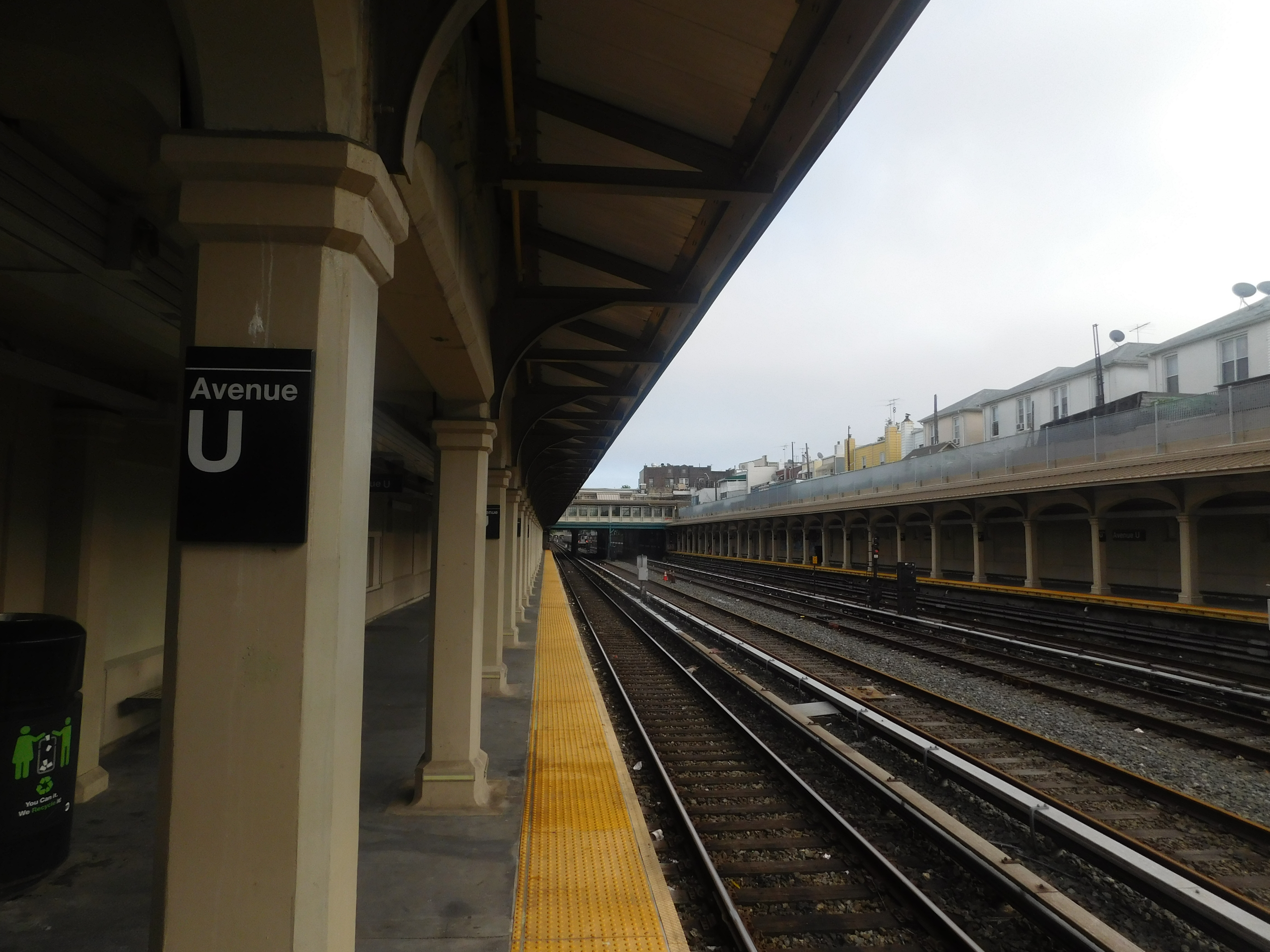
- Northbound platform in 2025

Station statistics
- Address: Avenue U & West Seventh Street; Brooklyn, New York
- Borough: Brooklyn
- Locale: Gravesend
- Coordinates: 40°35′47.38″N 73°58′44.28″W
- Division: B (BMT)
- Line: BMT Sea Beach Line
- Services: N (all times); W (selected rush-hour trips)
- Transit: NYCT Bus: B3
- Structure: Open-cut
- Platforms: 2 side platforms
- Tracks: 4 (2 in regular service)

Other information
- Opened: June 22, 1915 (111 years ago)
- Closed: January 18, 2016; 10 years ago (northbound reconstruction); July 31, 2017; 9 years ago (southbound reconstruction)
- Rebuilt: May 22, 2017; 9 years ago (northbound reopening); October 29, 2018; 8 years ago (southbound reopening)
- Other entrances/ exits: at Avenue U and Avenue T

Traffic
- 2025: 933,089 ▲4.7%
- Rank: 325 out of 423
Services
| Preceding station | New York City Subway | Following station |
|---|---|---|
| Kings Highway N W toward Astoria–Ditmars Boulevard | Local | 86th Street N W toward Coney Island–Stillwell Avenue |
Location
Location within New York City Subway
Location within New York City
Location within New York
Track layout
Street map
Station service legend
| Symbol | Description |
| Stops all times | Stops all times |
| Stops rush hours only | Stops rush hours only |
| Stops rush hours in the peak direction only | Stops rush hours in the peak direction only |
- Avenue U Station (Dual System BRT)
- U.S. National Register of Historic Places
- New York State Register of Historic Places
- MPS: New York City Subway System MPS
- NRHP reference No.: 05000675
- NYSRHP No.: 04701.021116

Significant dates
- Added to NRHP: July 6, 2005
- Designated NYSRHP: May 11, 2005

The Avenue U station is a local station on the BMT Sea Beach Line of the New York City Subway, located at the intersection of Avenue U and West Seventh Street in Gravesend, Brooklyn. It is served by the N train at all times. During rush hours, several W trains also serve this station.

== History ==
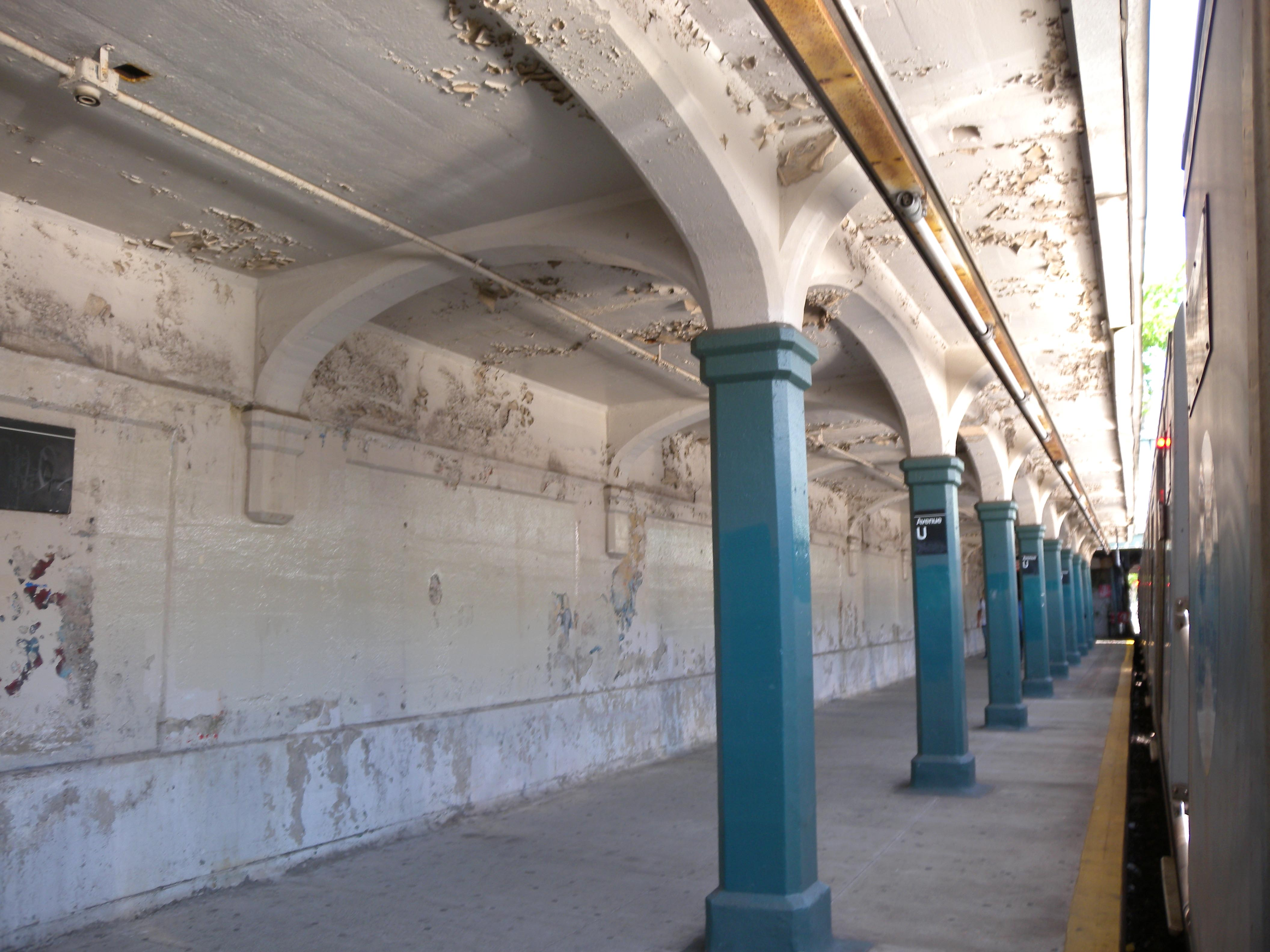
The southbound platform prior to its renovation

This station opened on June 22, 1915, along with the rest of the Sea Beach Line.

In 2005, the station was listed on the National Register of Historic Places.

From January 18, 2016 to May 22, 2017, the Manhattan-bound platform at this station was closed for renovations. The Coney Island-bound platform was closed from July 31, 2017 to October 29, 2018.

== Station layout ==
This station has four tracks and two side platforms. The two center express tracks are not normally used, but both are available for rerouted trains. The platforms are in an open cut. The concrete walls and columns are painted beige (prior to renovations the columns were blue-green). Alternating columns display the standard black station name plate with white lettering.

The 2018 artwork at this station is "Edges of a South Brooklyn Sky", a series of 14 glass mosaics made by Sally Gil. The artwork represent the local community of Gravesend and the diversity of its residents.

=== Exits ===
This station has two entrances, both of which are beige station houses at street-level between West Seventh and West Eighth Streets above the tracks and have a single staircase leading to each platform at either ends. The main exit at the south end has a turnstile bank and token booth and leads to Avenue U while the exit at the north end leads to Avenue T and is un-staffed, containing just HEET turnstiles and exit-only turnstiles.

== See also ==
- National Register of Historic Places listings in Brooklyn
