= Eighteenth Amendment of the Constitution of South Africa =

2023 South African constitutional amendment

Constitution Eighteenth Amendment Act of 2023

Parliament of South Africa
- Long title: Act to amend the Constitution of the Republic of South Africa, 1996, so as to recognise South African Sign Language as one of the official languages of the Republic; and to provide for matters incidental thereto.
- Passed by: National Assembly
- Passed: 2 May 2023
- Assented to: 19 July 2023
- Commenced: 26 June 2026

Legislative history
- Bill title: Constitution Eighteenth Amendment Bill
- Bill citation: B1—2023
- Introduced by: Ronald Lamola, Minister of Justice and Constitutional Development
- Introduced: 11 January 2023

Amends
- Constitution of the Republic of South Africa, 1996
- Status: In force

The Eighteenth Amendment of the Constitution of South Africa (formally the Constitution Eighteenth Amendment Act of 2023) made South African Sign Language an official language of South Africa.

The bill for the amendment was introduced in the National Assembly on 11 January 2023 by Ronald Lamola, the Minister of Justice and Constitutional Development. It was adopted unanimously by the assembly on 2 May, and signed by President Cyril Ramaphosa on 19 July of the same year. It came into force on 26 June 2026 when a presidential proclamation to that effect was published in the Government Gazette.

== History ==
The 1993 Interim Constitution did not mention South African Sign Language at all.

The South African National Deaf Association made a formal request to the Pan South African Language Board for South African Sign Language to become an official language in 1996.

In February 2020, the President announced the government's intention to recognise South African Sign Language as the twelfth official language. The National Assembly gave its approval on 2 May 2023. The law was given assent on 19 July 2023. On 19 July 2022, the Minister of Justice and Correctional Services published the draft bill for comment. In 2025, the Pan South African Language Board (PanSALB) criticised the lack of readiness among state institutions to meet the requirements under the amendment.
