= 18th Battalion =

18th Battalion may refer to:

- 18th Battalion (Australia), a unit of the Australian Army 1915–1944
- 2/18th Australian Infantry Battalion, a unit of the Australian Army 1940–1945
- 18th Battalion (Western Ontario), CEF, a unit of the Canadian Expeditionary Force 1914–1917
- 18th Logistics Battalion, a unit of the Belgian Army
- 18th Battalion (New Zealand), a unit of the New Zealand Army 1939–1945

== See also ==
- XVIII Corps (disambiguation)
- 18th Division (disambiguation)
- 18th Brigade (disambiguation)
- 18th Regiment (disambiguation)
- 18 Squadron (disambiguation)
