= 86th Street station (BMT Sea Beach Line) =

New York City Subway station in Brooklyn

86 Street
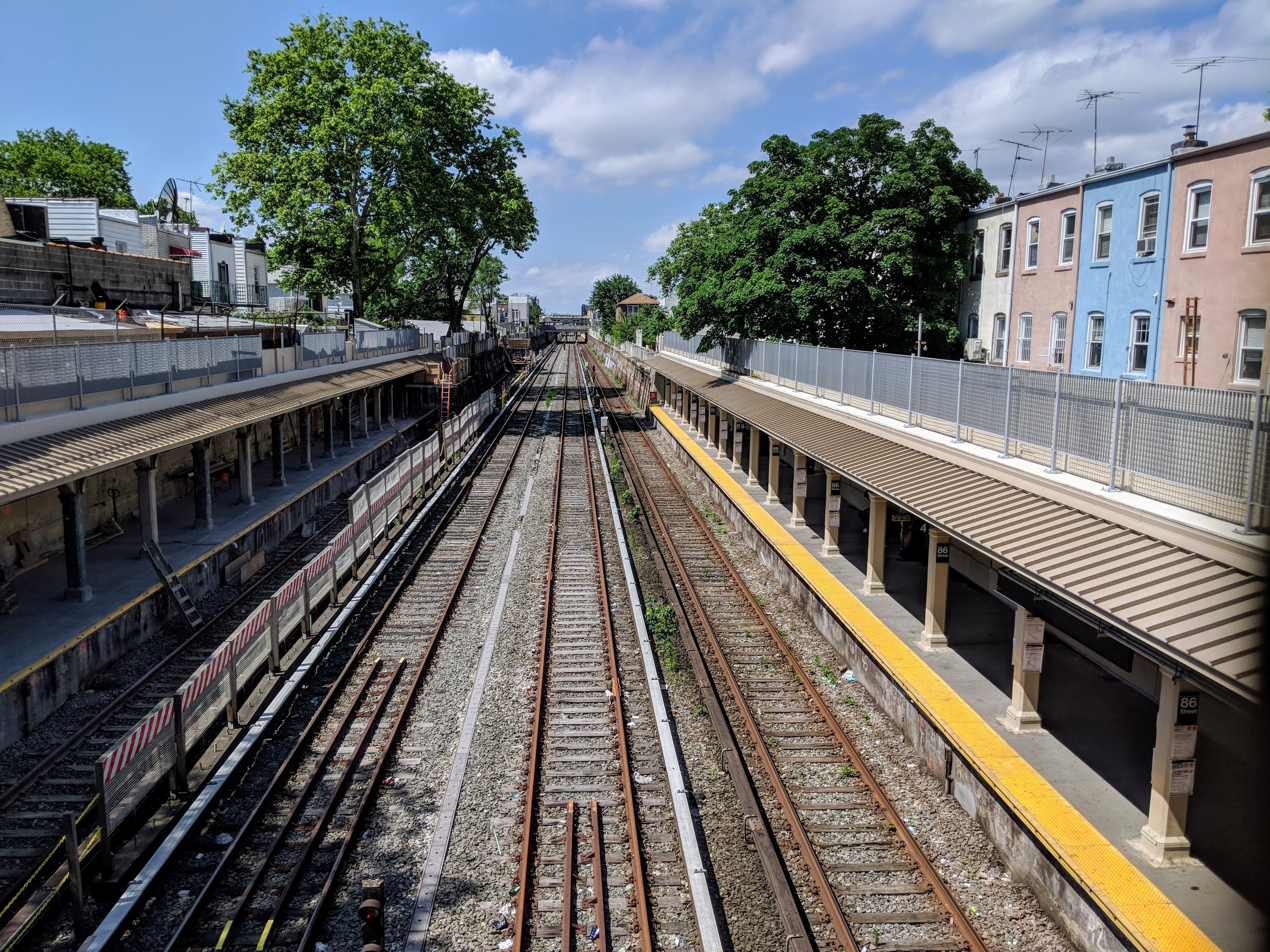

Station statistics
- Address: 86th Street & West Seventh Street; Brooklyn, New York
- Borough: Brooklyn
- Locale: Gravesend
- Coordinates: 40°35′33.56″N 73°58′41.74″W
- Division: B (BMT)
- Line: BMT Sea Beach Line
- Services: N (all times); W (selected rush-hour trips)
- Transit: NYCT Bus: B1, B4
- Structure: Open-cut
- Platforms: 2 side platforms
- Tracks: 4 (2 in regular service)

Other information
- Opened: June 22, 1915 (111 years ago)
- Closed: January 18, 2016; 10 years ago (northbound reconstruction); July 31, 2017; 9 years ago (southbound reconstruction)
- Rebuilt: May 22, 2017; 9 years ago (northbound reopening); October 29, 2018; 8 years ago (southbound reopening)
- Former/other names: Gravesend–86th Street

Traffic
- 2025: 568,153 ▲0.5%
- Rank: 380 out of 423
Services
Preceding station	New York City Subway	Following station
Avenue U N W toward Astoria–Ditmars Boulevard	Local	Coney Island–Stillwell Avenue N Terminus
Location
Location within New York City Subway
Location within New York City
Location within New York
Track layout
Street map
Station service legend
Symbol	Description
Stops all times	Stops all times
Stops rush hours only	Stops rush hours only
Stops rush hours in the peak direction only	Stops rush hours in the peak direction only

The 86th Street station (also known as the Gravesend–86th Street station) is a local station on the BMT Sea Beach Line of the New York City Subway, located at the intersection of 86th Street and West Seventh Street in Gravesend, Brooklyn. It is served by the N train at all times. During rush hours, several W trains also serve the station, which serves as the southern terminus for W trips to Brooklyn.

== History ==
The station opened on June 22, 1915, as part of an expanded Brooklyn Rapid Transit Company operation to Coney Island–Stillwell Avenue. Between 2001 and 2005, the station was known as Gravesend–86th Street when N trains originated/terminated here while the Coney Island–Stillwell Avenue terminal was reconstructed. Some destination signage continues to use this name.

From January 18, 2016 to May 22, 2017, the Manhattan-bound platform at this station was closed for renovations. The Coney Island-bound platform was closed from July 31, 2017 to October 29, 2018.

Between October 21, 2019 and Spring 2020, N trains terminated here so work could be completed to protect Coney Island Yard from flooding. An out-of-system transfer was available between the N at 86th Street and the F at Avenue X station.

== Station layout ==
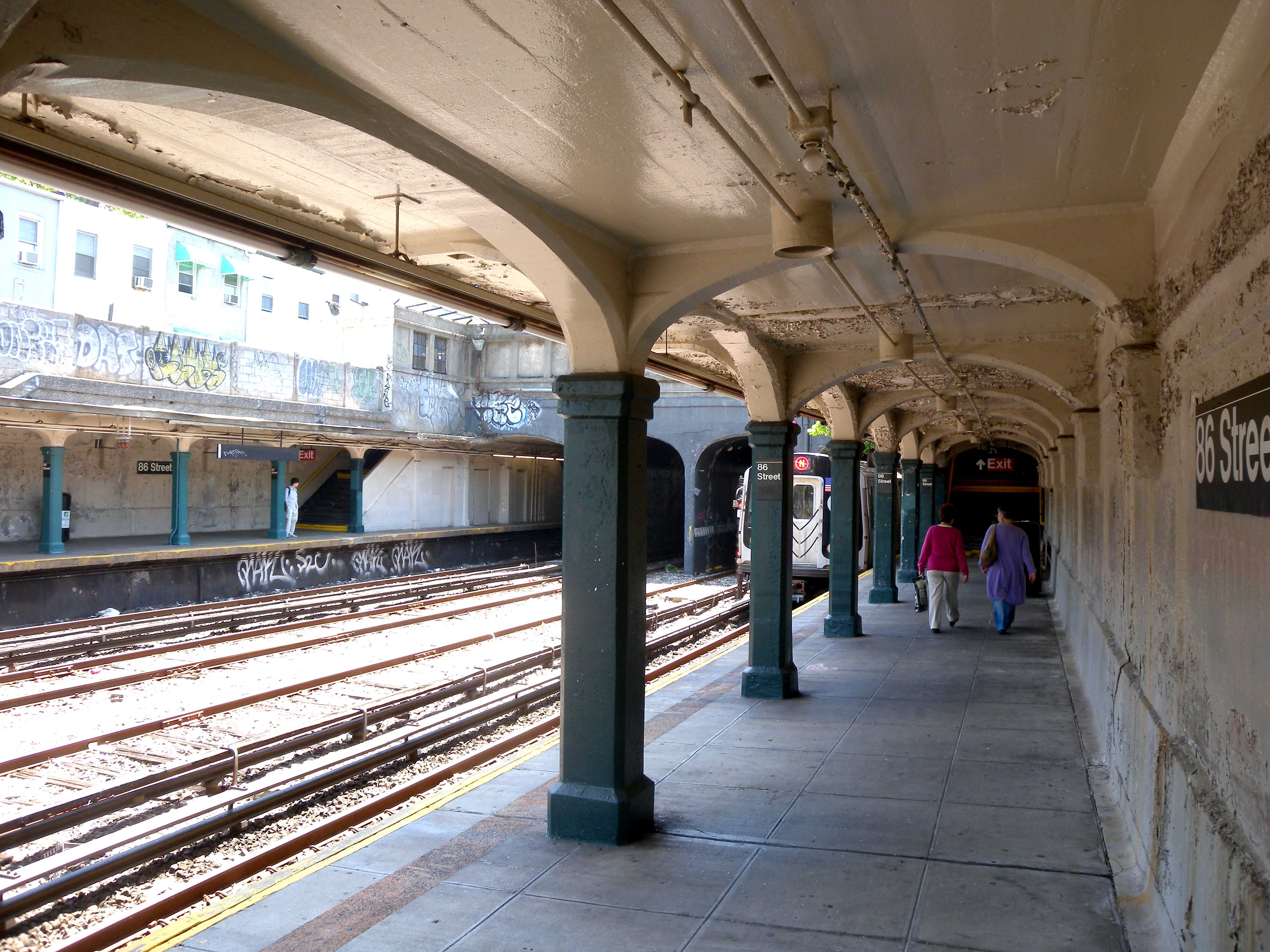
Southbound platform pre-renovation

The station has four tracks and two side platforms. The two center express tracks are not normally used, but both are available for rerouted trains. To the south of the station, the four tracks merge into two tracks and there is a connection to the Coney Island Complex. As of 2013, the Manhattan and Coney Island express tracks have been replaced with new track beds and new third rail protection boards.

There is a building on the Coney Island-bound platform for non-public uses. Like many other stations on the Sea Beach Line, the platforms are dilapidated and have paint-chipped columns. At the southern end of the station there is a pedestrian bridge for employees only that provides access to Coney Island Yard. South of the station the line exits the open cut and runs at-grade. Portions of the platform are located beneath 86th Street.

The 2018 artwork at this station is "Celebration", a glass mosaic made by Karen Margolis. The artwork highlights the connection between the neighborhood and commuters.

=== Exits ===
The only entrance to the station is through a station house at 86th Street between West 8th and West 7th Streets, and it has a crossover between platforms. There is an employee-only crossover between the platforms on the south end of the station; it is unknown if this crossover was part of a former second entrance, as the bridge also leads to a path to the nearby Coney Island Yard.
