= 18th Regiment =

18th Regiment or 18th Infantry Regiment may refer to:

- 18th Infantry Regiment (Imperial Japanese Army)
- 18th Regiment "Edolo", a unit of the Italian Army
- 18 (UKSF) Signal Regiment, a unit of the British Army
- 18th Royal Hussars, a unit of the British Army
- 18th Regiment of Bengal Native Infantry
- 18th Infantry (British Indian Army), a unit of the British Indian Army
- 18th Infantry Regiment (United States), a unit of the United States Army
- 18th Marine Regiment (United States), a unit of the United States Marine Corps
- Royal Irish Regiment (1684–1922) was formerly the 18th Regiment of Foot

American Civil War regiments

Confederate (Southern) Army regiments

- 18th Regiment Alabama Infantry
- 18th (Carroll's) Arkansas Infantry Regiment
- 18th (Marmaduke's) Arkansas Infantry Regiment
- 18th Georgia Volunteer Infantry
- 18th North Carolina Infantry
- 18th Virginia Cavalry
- 18th Virginia Infantry

Union (Northern) Army regiments

- 18th U.S. Colored Infantry
- 18th Connecticut Infantry Regiment
- 18th Illinois Volunteer Infantry Regiment
- 18th Iowa Volunteer Infantry Regiment
- 18th Regiment Indiana Infantry
- 18th Regiment Massachusetts Volunteer Infantry
- 18th Michigan Volunteer Infantry Regiment
- 18th Missouri Volunteer Infantry
- 18th New Hampshire Volunteer Infantry
- 18th New York Volunteer Infantry
- 18th Kansas Militia Infantry Regiment
- 18th Regiment Kentucky Volunteer Infantry
- 18th Ohio Infantry
- 18th Vermont Volunteer Infantry Regiment
- 18th Wisconsin Volunteer Infantry Regiment

== See also ==
- XVIII Corps (disambiguation)
- 18th Division (disambiguation)
- 18th Brigade (disambiguation)
- 18th Battalion (disambiguation)
- 18 Squadron (disambiguation)
