= Fifth Avenue–59th Street station =

New York City Subway station in Manhattan

5 Avenue–59 Street
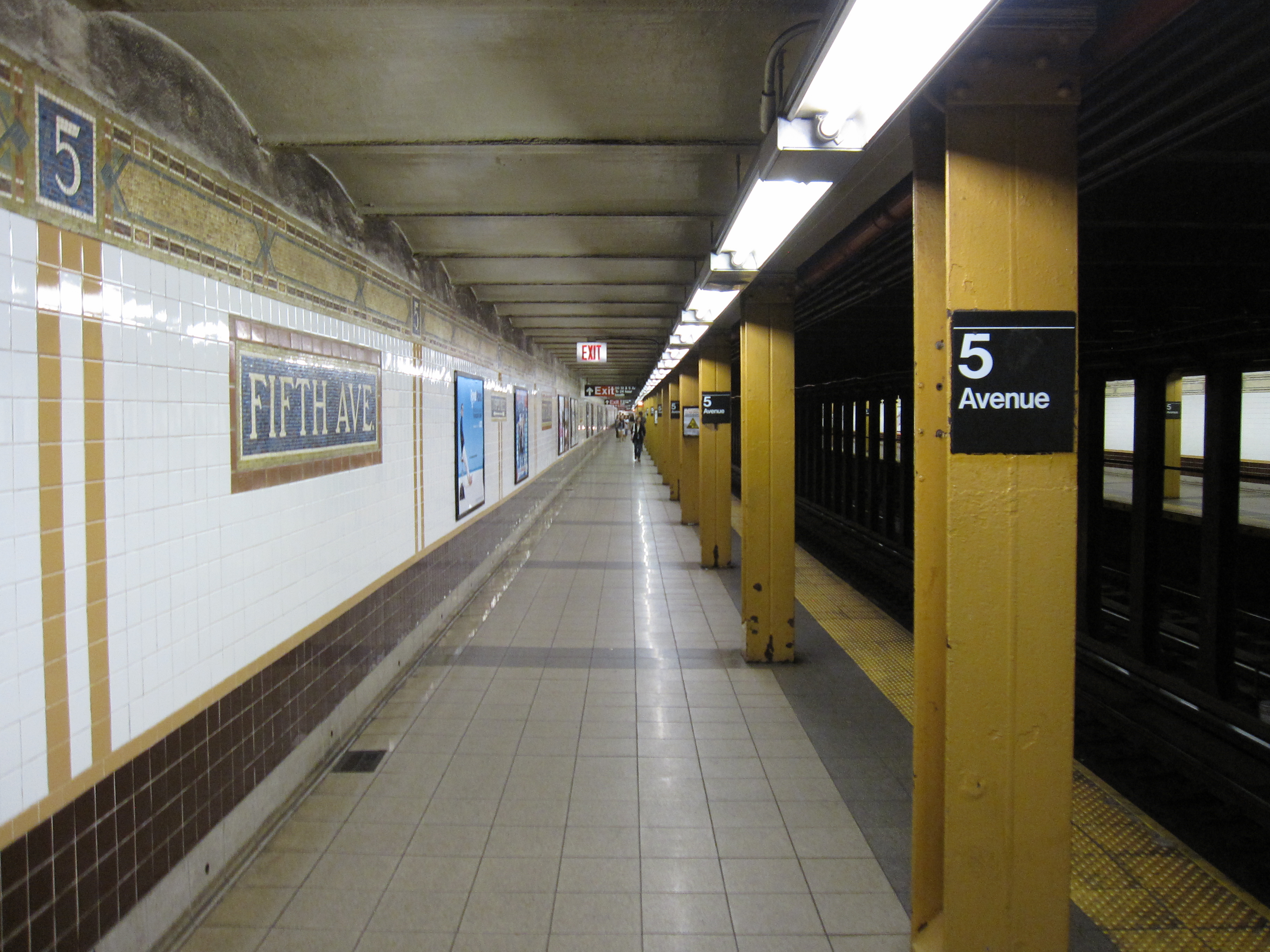
- Platform view

Station statistics
- Address: East 60th Street & Fifth Avenue; New York, New York
- Borough: Manhattan
- Locale: Midtown Manhattan, Upper East Side
- Coordinates: 40.764779°N 73.972621°W
- Division: B (BMT)
- Line: BMT Broadway Line
- Services: N (all times); R (all times except late nights); W (weekdays only)
- Transit: NYCT Bus: M1, M2, M3, M4, M5, SIM3, SIM6, SIM8, SIM10, SIM22, SIM23, SIM24, SIM25, SIM26, SIM30, SIM31; MTA Bus: Q32, BxM3, BxM4, BxM11
- Structure: Underground
- Platforms: 2 side platforms
- Tracks: 2

Other information
- Opened: September 1, 1919; 107 years ago
- Accessible: No; planned

Traffic
- 2025: 3,853,515 ▲0.7%
- Rank: 91 out of 423
Services
Preceding station	New York City Subway	Following station
57th Street–Seventh Avenue N R W via Times Square–42nd Street	N (New York City Subway service) R (New York City Subway service) W (New York City Subway service)	Lexington Avenue–59th Street N R W services split
Location
Location within New York City Subway
Location within New York City
Location within New York
Track layout
Street map
Station service legend
Symbol	Description
Stops all times except late nights	Stops all times except late nights
Stops all times	Stops all times
Stops weekdays during the day	Stops weekdays during the day

The Fifth Avenue–59th Street station (signed as Fifth Avenue) is a local station on the BMT Broadway Line of the New York City Subway. Located under Grand Army Plaza near the intersection of 5th Avenue and 60th Street in Manhattan, it is served by the N train at all times, the W train on weekdays during the day, and the R train at all times except late nights.

== History ==
=== Construction and opening ===
The New York Public Service Commission adopted plans for what was known as the Broadway–Lexington Avenue route on December 31, 1907. This route began at the Battery and ran under Greenwich Street, Vesey Street, Broadway to Ninth Street, private property to Irving Place, and Irving Place and Lexington Avenue to the Harlem River. After crossing under the Harlem River into the Bronx, the route split at Park Avenue and 138th Street, with one branch continuing north to and along Jerome Avenue to Woodlawn Cemetery, and the other heading east and northeast along 138th Street, Southern Boulevard, and Westchester Avenue to Pelham Bay Park. In early 1908, the Tri-borough plan was formed, combining this route, the under-construction Centre Street Loop Subway in Manhattan and Fourth Avenue Subway in Brooklyn, a Canal Street subway from the Fourth Avenue Subway via the Manhattan Bridge to the Hudson River, and several other lines in Brooklyn.

The Brooklyn Rapid Transit Company submitted a proposal to the Commission, dated March 2, 1911, to operate the Tri-borough system (but under Church Street instead of Greenwich Street), as well as a branch along Broadway, Seventh Avenue, and 59th Street from Ninth Street north and east to the Queensboro Bridge; the Canal Street subway was to merge with the Broadway Line instead of continuing to the Hudson River. The city, the BRT, and the Interborough Rapid Transit Company (which operated the first subway and four elevated lines in Manhattan) came to an agreement, and sent a report to the New York City Board of Estimate on June 5, 1911. The line along Broadway to 59th Street was assigned to the BRT, while the IRT obtained the Lexington Avenue line, connecting with its existing route at Grand Central–42nd Street. Construction began on Lexington Avenue on July 31, and on Broadway the next year. The Dual Contracts, two operating contracts between the city and the BMT and IRT, were adopted on March 4, 1913.

The original plan there was to build a pair of single-track tunnels under 59th and 60th Streets, rising onto the Queensboro Bridge and crossing the East River to Queens, with stations at Fifth and Lexington Avenues. In July 1914, the Public Service Commission opened bids for the construction of the two tunnels. The Degnon Contracting Company submitted the lowest of five bids for the project at just over $2.8 million. Degnon received the contract and began constructing the tunnels that September. In 1915, the Public Service Commission approved a request from the New York City Board of Estimate to place both tracks under 60th Street and cross the East River in the 60th Street Tunnel.

A. W. King received a $126,000 contract in December 1918 to install finishes at the Lexington Avenue and Fifth Avenue stations on the Broadway Line. The station opened on September 1, 1919, as part of an extension of the Broadway Line from 57th Street–Seventh Avenue to Lexington Avenue/59th Street. Service originally operated northward to Lexington Avenue and southward to Whitehall Street at the southern end of Manhattan. Service to Queens began when the 60th Street Tunnel opened on August 1, 1920.

=== Later years ===
The station was operated by the BMT until the city government took over the BMT's operations on June 1, 1940. This station was overhauled in the late 1970s. The MTA fixed the station's structure and overall appearance, replacing the original wall tiles, old signs, and incandescent lighting with 1970s modern-look wall tile band and tablet mosaics, signs and fluorescent lights. It also fixed staircases and platform edges.

In 1997, the station received a major overhaul. It received state-of-art repairs as well as an upgrade of the station for ADA compliance and restoration the original late 1910s tiling. The MTA repaired the staircases, re-tiling for the walls, installed new tiling on the floors, upgraded the station's lights and the public address system, and installed ADA yellow safety threads along the platform edges, new signs, and new track-beds in both directions.

An elevator to the southbound platform was proposed as part of the construction of a neighboring building at 625 Madison Avenue. Work on the elevator began in November 2026.

== Station layout ==
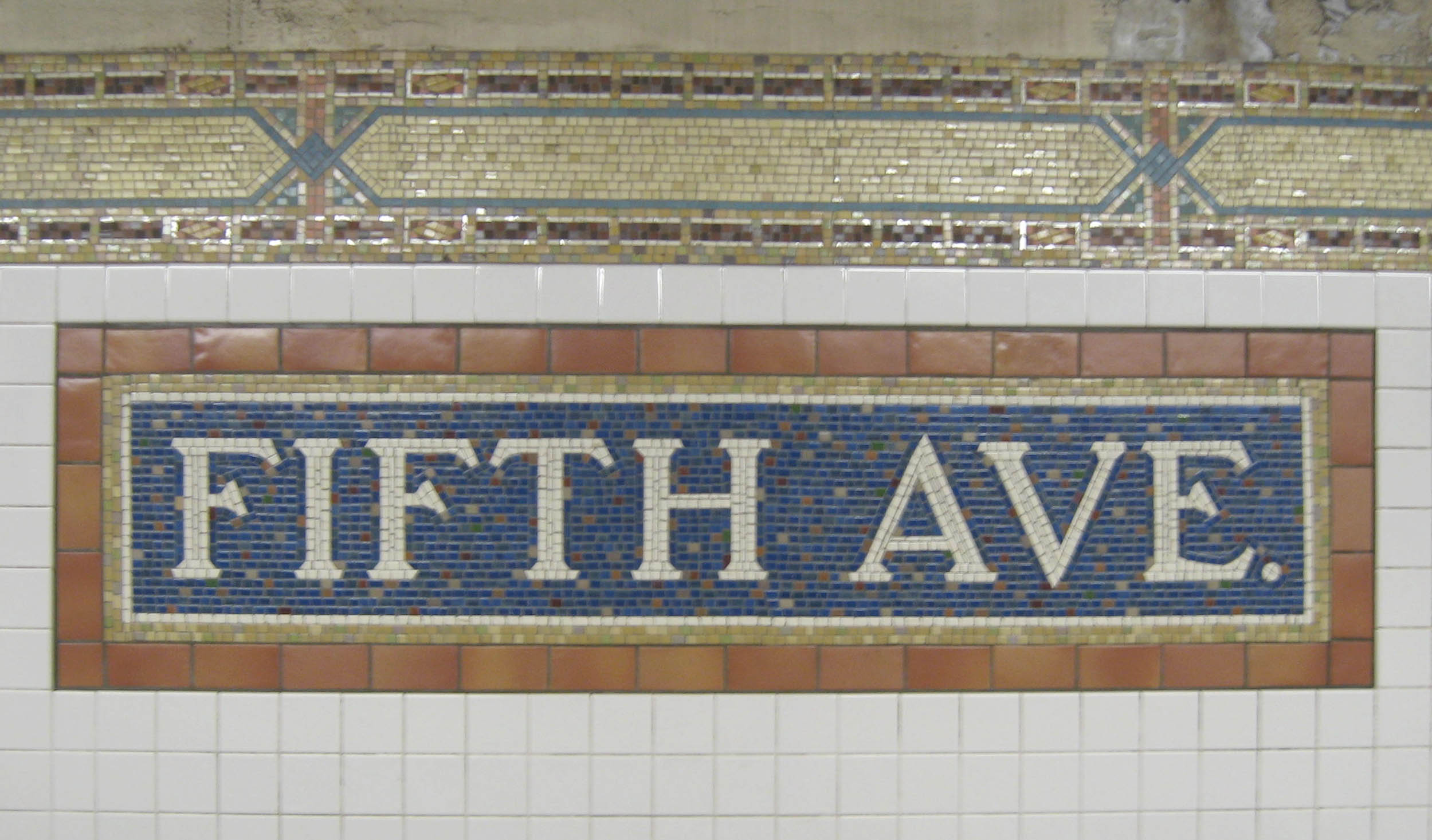
Mosaics

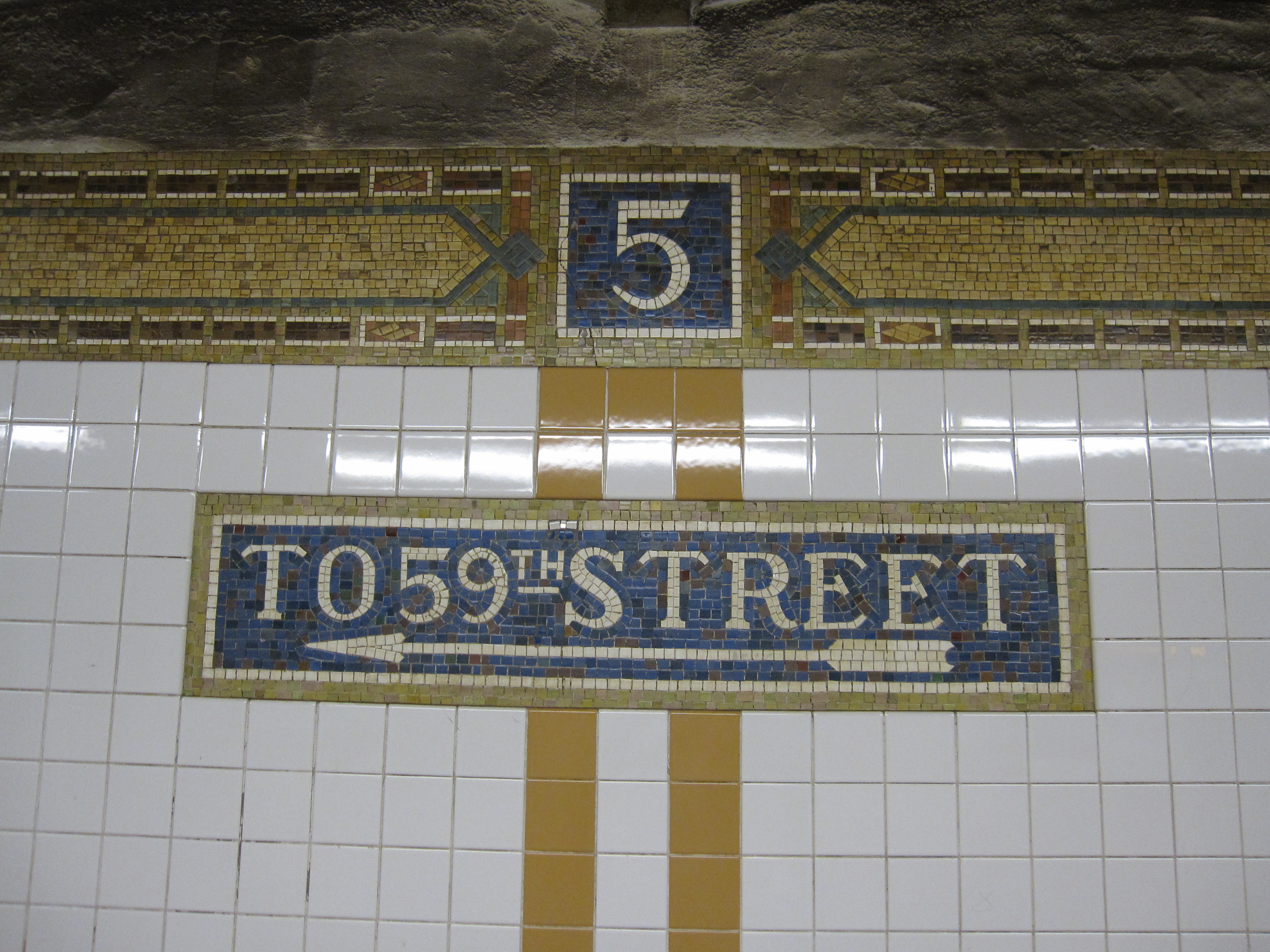
Directional mosaics

This underground station has two tracks and two side platforms, with a mezzanine above both the western and eastern ends of the station. The station is served by N trains at all times; R trains except at night; and W trains only on weekdays during the day. The station is between Lexington Avenue/59th Street to the east (railroad north) and 57th Street–Seventh Avenue to the west (railroad south).

Replicas of BMT directional mosaics "QUEENS TRAINS" and "BROOKLYN TRAINS" are found on the western exit. Each mezzanine has one stair to each platform. Mosaics "5", "Fifth Ave", and the directional signs on each platform, are fully preserved with new tiles encircling around them.

The artwork at the station, Urban Oasis by Ann Schaumburger, was commissioned in 1997 as part of the MTA Arts & Design program. It uses glass mosaic murals to depict families of different types of animals, particularly for the nearby Central Park Zoo. The mosaics in the station include gentoo penguins, polar bears, snails, parrots, monkeys, and a golden horse.

=== Exits ===
The full-time side of the station at the north end, at 60th Street and Fifth Avenue, has three street staircases, one carved into the outer perimeter of Central Park (northwestern corner of that intersection) and the other two on either eastern corner of the intersection. The part-time side at Central Park South, just by the Plaza Hotel, formerly had a booth (closed in 2003) and three street staircases as well: two carved inside Central Park's perimeter, on the northern side of Central Park South, and one to the southern side, inside a building just west of the Plaza Hotel. This passageway also has an entrance for employees of the Plaza Hotel, connecting the station to the hotel's basement.

Despite its name, the station has no exit at the corner of Fifth Avenue and 59th Street.
