= Lexington Avenue/59th Street station =

New York City Subway station in Manhattan

Lexington Avenue/59 Street
- New York City Subway station complex
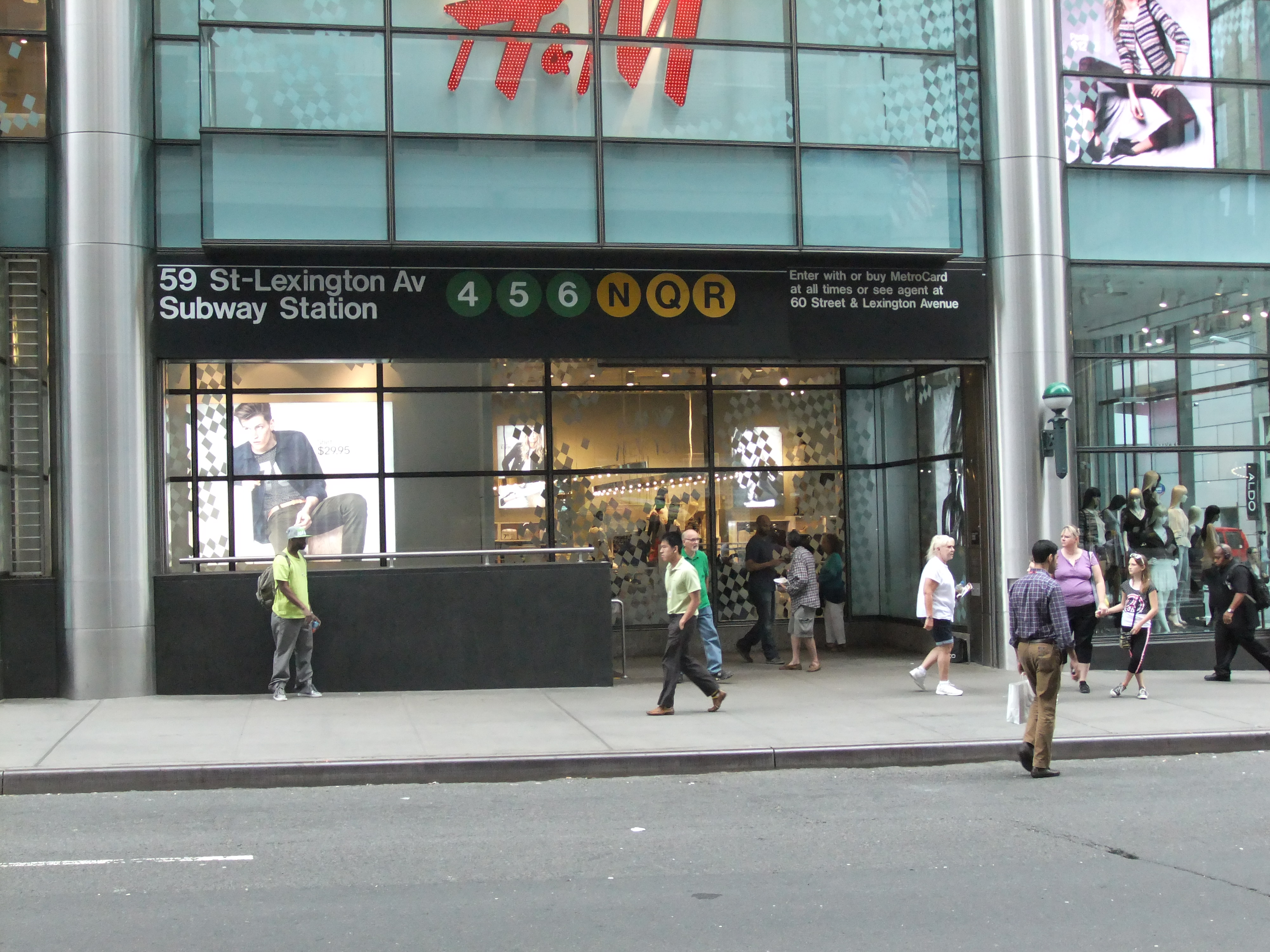
- Street stair by southeast corner of 59th Street and Lexington Avenue (the Q train served this station between 2010 and 2016, when the W did not run)

Station statistics
- Address: East 59th Street & Lexington Avenue; New York, New York
- Borough: Manhattan
- Locale: Midtown Manhattan, Upper East Side
- Coordinates: 40.762471°N 73.9679°W
- Division: A (IRT), B (BMT)
- Line: BMT Broadway Line; IRT Lexington Avenue Line
- Services: 4 (all times); 5 (all times except late nights); 6 (all times) <6> (weekdays until 8:45 p.m., peak direction); N (all times); R (all times except late nights); W (weekdays only)
- System transfers: With OMNY only: F (late nights and weekends); M (weekdays during the day); N (limited weekday rush hour service only); Q (all times); R (one a.m. rush hour trip in the northbound direction only) at Lexington Avenue–63rd Street
- Transit: NYCT Bus: M101, M102, M103; MTA Bus: Q32, QM2, QM20
- Structure: Underground
- Levels: 3

Other information
- Opened: July 1, 1948; 78 years ago (transfer)
- Accessible: No; planned

Traffic
- 2025: 12,048,703 ▲0.7%
- Rank: 15 out of 423
Location
Location within New York City Subway
Location within New York City
Location within New York
Street map
Station service legend
Symbol	Description
Stops all times except late nights	Stops all times except late nights
Stops all times	Stops all times
Stops rush hours in the peak direction only	Stops rush hours in the peak direction only
Stops weekdays during the day	Stops weekdays during the day

The Lexington Avenue/59th Street station (also signed as 59th Street–Lexington Avenue) is a New York City Subway station complex shared by the IRT Lexington Avenue Line and the BMT Broadway Line. It is located at Lexington Avenue between 59th and 60th Streets, on the border of Midtown and the Upper East Side of Manhattan. The station complex is the fourteenth-busiest in the system, with over 21 million passengers in 2016.

It is served by the 4, 6, and N trains at all times, the 5 and R trains except at night, and the W train only on weekdays during the day. In addition, the <6> train stops here in the peak direction only on weekdays during the day.

A free out-of-system OMNY transfer is available to the 63rd Street Lines (M and Q trains, as well as night/weekend F trains and rush-hour N and R trains) by exiting the station and walking to the Lexington Avenue–63rd Street station.

== History ==
=== Construction and planning ===
Following the completion of the original subway line operated by the Interborough Rapid Transit Company (IRT), there were plans to construct the Broadway–Lexington Avenue Line along Manhattan's east side. The New York Public Service Commission adopted plans for what was known as the Broadway–Lexington Avenue route on December 31, 1907. This route began at the Battery and ran under Greenwich Street, Vesey Street, Broadway to Ninth Street, private property to Irving Place, and Irving Place and Lexington Avenue to the Harlem River. After crossing under the Harlem River into the Bronx, the route split at Park Avenue and 138th Street, with one branch continuing north to and along Jerome Avenue to Woodlawn Cemetery, and the other heading east and northeast along 138th Street, Southern Boulevard, and Westchester Avenue to Pelham Bay Park. In early 1908, the Tri-borough plan was formed, combining this route, the under-construction Centre Street Loop Subway in Manhattan and Fourth Avenue Subway in Brooklyn, a Canal Street subway from the Fourth Avenue Subway via the Manhattan Bridge to the Hudson River, and several other lines in Brooklyn.

The Brooklyn Rapid Transit Company (BRT; after 1923, the Brooklyn–Manhattan Transit Corporation or BMT) submitted a proposal to the commission, dated March 2, 1911, to operate the Tri-borough system (but under Church Street instead of Greenwich Street), as well as a branch along Broadway, Seventh Avenue, and 59th Street from Ninth Street north and east to the Queensboro Bridge; the Canal Street subway was to merge with the Broadway Line instead of continuing to the Hudson River. The city, the BRT, and the IRT reached an agreement and sent a report to the New York City Board of Estimate on June 5, 1911, wherein the line along Broadway to 59th Street was assigned to the BRT. The New York City Board of Estimate approved the report on June 21.

Originally, the commission had also assigned the operation of the Lexington Avenue Line in Manhattan to the BRT, as the IRT had withdrawn from negotiations over the proposed tri-borough system. The IRT proposed in December 1911 that it be assigned the Lexington Avenue Line, in exchange for dropping its opposition to the BRT's operation of the Broadway Line. The Lexington Avenue Line was to connect with the IRT's existing subway north of Grand Central–42nd Street. The IRT submitted an offer for what became its portion of the Dual Contracts on February 27, 1912. The Dual Contracts, two operating contracts between the city and the BMT and IRT, were adopted on March 4, 1913, and signed on March 19. The BRT was authorized to construct a station on its Broadway Line at Lexington Avenue and 59th Street, while the IRT was authorized to construct a local station on its Lexington Avenue Line at the same location.

==== Lexington Avenue Line station ====
The Public Service Commission awarded five construction contracts for the construction of the Lexington Avenue Line on July 20, 1911, four of which were assigned to the Bradley Construction Company. Work on the line began on July 31. Among the contracts awarded to the Bradley Construction Company was that for section 8 of the Lexington Avenue Line, which extended from 53rd to 67th Street. This section of the line was built as a two-level tunnel, with local tracks above the express tracks. Workers excavated an 80-foot-deep (24 m) shaft at 62nd Street and then dug out both levels of the tunnel. During the construction of section 8, the contractor had to underpin one of every five buildings on Lexington Avenue between 53rd and 67th Street. By late 1912, work on both levels was proceeding simultaneously. At least 11 workers were killed in June 1913 when a portion of the tunnel near 56th Street collapsed. In addition. part of the upper level's roof collapsed near 60th Street in January 1914, killing one worker and injuring two more.

As part of the Dual Contracts, the Public Service Commission planned to split the original IRT into three segments: two north–south lines, carrying through trains over the Lexington Avenue and Broadway–Seventh Avenue Lines, and a west–east shuttle under 42nd Street. This would form a roughly H-shaped system. It was predicted that the subway extension would lead to the growth of the Upper East Side and the Bronx. After the modified plans were released, property owners near the intersection of Lexington Avenue and 59th Street advocated for the local station at that intersection to be converted into an express station. However, the Public Service Commission's chief engineer Alfred Craven rejected the proposal in August 1914, saying it would be too expensive to construct express platforms at the station.

Work on the Lexington Avenue Line tunnel between 53rd and 67th Streets had been completed by early 1915, but it could not be opened for at least three years because a connection to the existing IRT at Grand Central–42nd Street was still under construction. In July 1915, the Public Service Commission received the rights to build a subway entrance for the IRT station at Lexington Avenue and 59th Street within the Bloomingdale's flagship store. Although the subway remained unopened, real-estate prices around Lexington Avenue and 59th Street had begun to increase by 1916. The Lexington Avenue Line station at 59th Street opened on July 17, 1918, with service initially running between Grand Central–42nd Street and 167th Street via the line's local tracks. On August 1, the "H system" was put into place, with through service beginning on the new east and west side trunk lines, and the institution of the 42nd Street Shuttle along the old connection between the sides. The cost of the extension from Grand Central was $58 million.

==== Broadway Line station ====
In the report that had been submitted to the Board of Estimate in June 1911, the BRT was to construct a line traveling east under 59th Street before ascending onto the Queensboro Bridge. The original plan there was to build a pair of single-track tunnels under 59th and 60th Streets, rising onto the bridge to Queens, with stations at Fifth and Lexington Avenues. Just east of the Lexington Avenue station, the line would have ascended at a 5.8 percent grade to reach the bridge. In July 1914, the Public Service Commission opened bids for the construction of the two tunnels. The Degnon Contracting Company submitted the lowest of five bids for the project at just over $2.8 million. Degnon received the contract and began constructing the tunnels that September.

By December 1914, the Board of Estimate had abandoned its original proposal to use the Queensboro Bridge for subway trains, which would have required $2.6 million in modifications to the bridge and would have caused serious congestion. Instead, the board planned to build a double-tracked 60th Street Tunnel under the East River, which would allow the city to save $500,000 by not constructing a tunnel under 59th Street. Degnon proposed building this tunnel for $4.5 million. The Board of Estimate approved the plan in February 1915, and the New York State Legislature shortly afterward legally approved the revised route. On July 28, 1915, the Public Service Commission approved the Board of Estimate's request to place both tracks under 60th Street and cross the East River in the 60th Street Tunnel. A piece of the tunnel under 59th Street had already been built and became a walkway connecting the two side platforms of the IRT's 59th Street station.

A. W. King received a $126,000 contract in December 1918 to install finishes at the Lexington Avenue and Fifth Avenue stations on the Broadway Line. The station opened on September 1, 1919, as the new terminal of the Broadway Line with an extension of the line from 57th Street–Seventh Avenue. Service originally operated southward to Whitehall Street at the southern end of Manhattan. This station ceased to be the line's terminal with the extension of the line to Queensboro Plaza through the 60th Street Tunnel on August 1, 1920. An entrance leading from the BMT station to the Bloomingdale's store opened on the same day that the line was extended to Queens. This entrance measured 60 feet (18 m) deep and had five display windows.

=== 1920s to 1960s ===
The IRT station originally served local trains only. In Fiscal Year 1930, a crossunder under the local tracks was opened, connecting the southbound and northbound platforms. This passageway was funded by Bloomingdale's and was dedicated on November 11, 1930. A new entrance from the Lexington Avenue/59th Street station to Bloomingdale's flagship store was also built in late 1930 as part of an expansion of the store.

The city government took over the BMT's operations on June 1, 1940, and the IRT's operations on June 12, 1940. A transfer passageway between the BMT and IRT stations were placed inside fare control on July 1, 1948. Initially, only the southbound IRT local platform had a direct free transfer to the BMT platform. Later that year, an additional subway entrance was proposed as part of the construction of a building on the southeastern corner of Lexington Avenue and 59th Street. At the time, more than 15 million passengers entered the station annually. A direct transfer passageway connecting the northbound IRT local platform with the BMT platform opened on August 7, 1952. The New York City Transit Authority (NYCTA) began constructing five staircases between the IRT and BMT stations at Lexington Avenue/59th Street in May 1956, following the completion of the 60th Street Tunnel Connection in Queens, which allowed trains in the 60th Street Tunnel to run along the Queens Boulevard Line, in December 1955. An escalator connecting the IRT and BMT stations opened in September 1958.

To reduce crime, in 1965, the NYCTA began closing two of the station's entrances at night. In addition, as part of the construction of the 63rd Street lines, the NYCTA proposed constructing a three-block-long passageway with stores, which would connect the Lexington Avenue/59th Street station with a new Lexington Avenue station on the 63rd Street Line. Although the line received final approval in 1969 as part of the Program for Action, a wide-ranging expansion program for the New York City Subway system, the passageway was never built.

==== Construction of IRT express platforms ====
On November 4, 1954, the NYCTA approved plans to convert 59th Street into an express station. The project was proposed by the executive director of the NYCTA, Sidney Bingham, to improve connections between the Lexington Avenue Line and the Broadway Line. At the time, the 59th Street station had been the busiest on the Lexington Avenue Line. According to Bingham, an express stop at Lexington Avenue/59th Street would alleviate congestion caused by the opening of the 60th Street Tunnel Connection. The new express stop was also expected to reduce transfer congestion at Grand Central–42nd Street. Construction was expected to take two or three years and cost up to $5 million. In the late 1950s and early 1960s, the NYCTA undertook a $138 million (equivalent to $1.52 billion in 2025) modernization project for the Lexington Avenue Line. As part of the modernization program, the NYCTA announced in January 1957 that it would extend the local platforms and build express platforms at 59th Street.

The NYCTA approved a revision to the express platform project on April 8, 1959, and construction for the express station began on August 27, 1959. The Slattery Construction Corporation was hired as the main contractor for the project, which cost $6.5 million. Along with the new express platforms, a new mezzanine was built above the platforms to connect them to the local station and the Broadway Line station. Two high speed escalators were added to connect the local and express platforms. Two additional high-speed escalators were built to connect the local platforms with the new mezzanine. As part of the plan, the local platforms were extended to accommodate 10-car trains. In addition, new entrances and booths were added to the 59th Street ends of the northbound and southbound sides.

Work on the express station at 59th Street required express trains to run on the local tracks during late nights. Workers began using dynamite to blast out a cavern for the express platforms in October 1959. The blasts took place at all hours of the day but could not occur when trains passed by the station. The project necessitated excavating about 17,000 tons of dirt. Work was complicated by the fact that there were two underground streams at 58th and 59th Streets, requiring workers to install waterproofing around the station. The Board of Estimate provided $5 million in December 1960 to expedite the express platforms' construction. By November 1961, the platforms were almost completed, and workers were installing tiles on the walls. The express platforms opened on November 15, 1962, three months earlier than originally planned. The completion of the express station, among other factors, resulted in increased profits and patronage for businesses near the intersection of 59th Street and Lexington Avenue.

=== 1970s to present ===
By 1970, the 59th Street station on the Lexington Avenue Line was among the subway system's 12 worst bottlenecks for passenger flow. At the time, the New York City Planning Commission planned to spend $2.1 million to add entrances at Third Avenue and 60th Street, alleviating congestion in the exits on Lexington Avenue. That April, the City Planning Commission allotted another $3.4 million to the project. The commission also provided funding for the lengthening of the Broadway Line platform. Although the new entrances would be right outside the Bloomingdale's store, the department store did not contribute any funding to the project. Although many subway stations in Midtown Manhattan saw steep decreases in ridership during the 1970s, the Lexington Avenue/59th Street station actually saw a 25 percent increase in ridership compared with the 1960s. The station recorded 14.1 million annual entries by 1975.

During the mid-1970s, Metropolitan Transportation Authority (MTA) chairman David Yunich talked with local merchants about the possibility of raising money for a renovation of the station, which would be funded equally by the MTA and the merchants. The agency closed one of the station's token booths in 1977 to save money, although the booth was reopened shortly afterward. The MTA announced in late 1978 that it would modernize the Lexington Avenue/59th Street station. The improvements included new finishes on the walls and floors; acoustical, signage, and lighting improvements; replacement of old mechanical equipment; and new handrails. The MTA included funding for a renovation of the Lexington Avenue/59th Street station to its 1980–1984 capital plan. In April 1993, the New York State Legislature agreed to give the MTA $9.6 billion for capital improvements. Some of the funds would be used to renovate nearly one hundred New York City Subway stations, including both stations at Lexington Avenue/59th Street.

In 2002, the Broadway Line station received a major overhaul. The MTA repaired the staircases, re-tiled the walls, added new tiling on the floors, upgraded the station's lights and the public address system, and installed ADA yellow safety threads along the platform edge, new signs, and new trackbeds in both directions. The original tiling at the Lexington Avenue Line local platforms and the Broadway Line platform were restored, and the original tiling at the Lexington Avenue Line express platforms was covered up with new tiling. This station was renovated in conjunction with the construction of the Bloomberg Tower at 59th Street and Lexington Avenue. Although a new entrance was constructed within the building, it has remained closed due to fears of icicle formation on a railing that is part of the building's design, directly above the street entrance. A legal battle between the city and the building's management over who is responsible for modifying the design caused the entrance to be temporarily closed between 2003 and 2006.

In 2019, the MTA announced that the station would become ADA-accessible as part of the agency's 2020–2024 Capital Program. In early 2024, to discourage fare evasion, the MTA reconfigured emergency exits at the 59th Street IRT station so the exits opened only after a 15-second delay. The accessibility project was to be funded by congestion pricing in New York City, but it was postponed in June 2024 after the implementation of congestion pricing was delayed. The MTA added spiked panels to the station's turnstiles in early 2025 to prevent fare evaders from vaulting over the turnstiles. Later that year, fashion house Louis Vuitton proposed financing a new elevator and other renovations at the Lexington Avenue/59th Street station, in exchange for being allowed to construct a taller building nearby at 1 East 57th Street, where the company was rebuilding its store.

== Station layout ==
The complex consists of four levels. The IRT local platforms comprise the first basement level, running in a roughly north–south direction about 23 feet (7.0 m) below the street. The BMT platform is on the second basement level, 47 feet (14 m) below the street. The mezzanine below the BMT platform is 62 feet (19 m) deep and was installed during the 1962 renovations. The fourth and deepest level consists of the IRT express platforms, which are 73 feet (22 m) deep; each express platform contained an escalator that ascended to the local platform above it. A pair of escalators originally rose from the mezzanine to the IRT local platforms. There are also three staircases up to the BMT platform, two down to each of the lower level IRT express platforms, and one staircase and escalator up to the IRT local platforms on the upper level.

There is a free out-of-system transfer to the 63rd Street lines (serving F, M and Q trains, as well as rush-hour N and R trains). The transfer requires exiting the station, walking to the Lexington Avenue–63rd Street station, and entering that station using OMNY. This transfer was first offered in 1998. As of 2020, it was one of a few such transfers in the system.

=== Artwork ===
The mezzanine between the IRT express platforms and the BMT platform has a large-scale mosaic mural entitled Blooming (1996), created by Elizabeth Murray as part of the MTA Arts & Design program. It covers all four walls of the mezzanine area and takes its name from the nearby Bloomingdale's department store. The mosaic features larger versions of the coffee cups and slippers found on the platform walls, with the text: "In dreams begin responsibilities" and "Conduct your blooming in the noise and whip of the whirlwind". The text floats from the coffee cups and are excerpted from poetry by Delmore Schwartz and Gwendolyn Brooks. Additional, mini shoe mosaics can be found on the IRT express platforms. In creating Blooming, Murray said she "had this vision of people getting up really early, half in a dream state, putting on their clothes, drinking a cup of coffee and getting on the subway to go to work". This is one of two murals Murray made for MTA Arts & Design; the other, Stream, is at Court Square/23rd Street.

=== Entrances and exits ===
The complex has a total of 11 staircase entrances. There are staircases to the Broadway Line platform and that are signed for the northbound Lexington Avenue Line platform at the eastern corners of 60th Street and Lexington Avenue, and staircases to the Broadway Line platform and that are signed for the southbound Lexington Avenue Line platform at the western corners of 60th Street and Lexington Avenue. Staircases from the southbound Lexington Avenue Line platform lead to the southwestern and northwestern corners of Lexington Avenue and 59th Street, while there are two exits to the southeastern corner of that intersection from the northbound platform, with one leading directly to the street, and one located in a passageway to Bloomingdale's. The station also has staircases to all four corners of Third Avenue and 60th Street, leading to a mezzanine with escalators for the Broadway Line platform.

== IRT Lexington Avenue Line platforms ==
59 Street
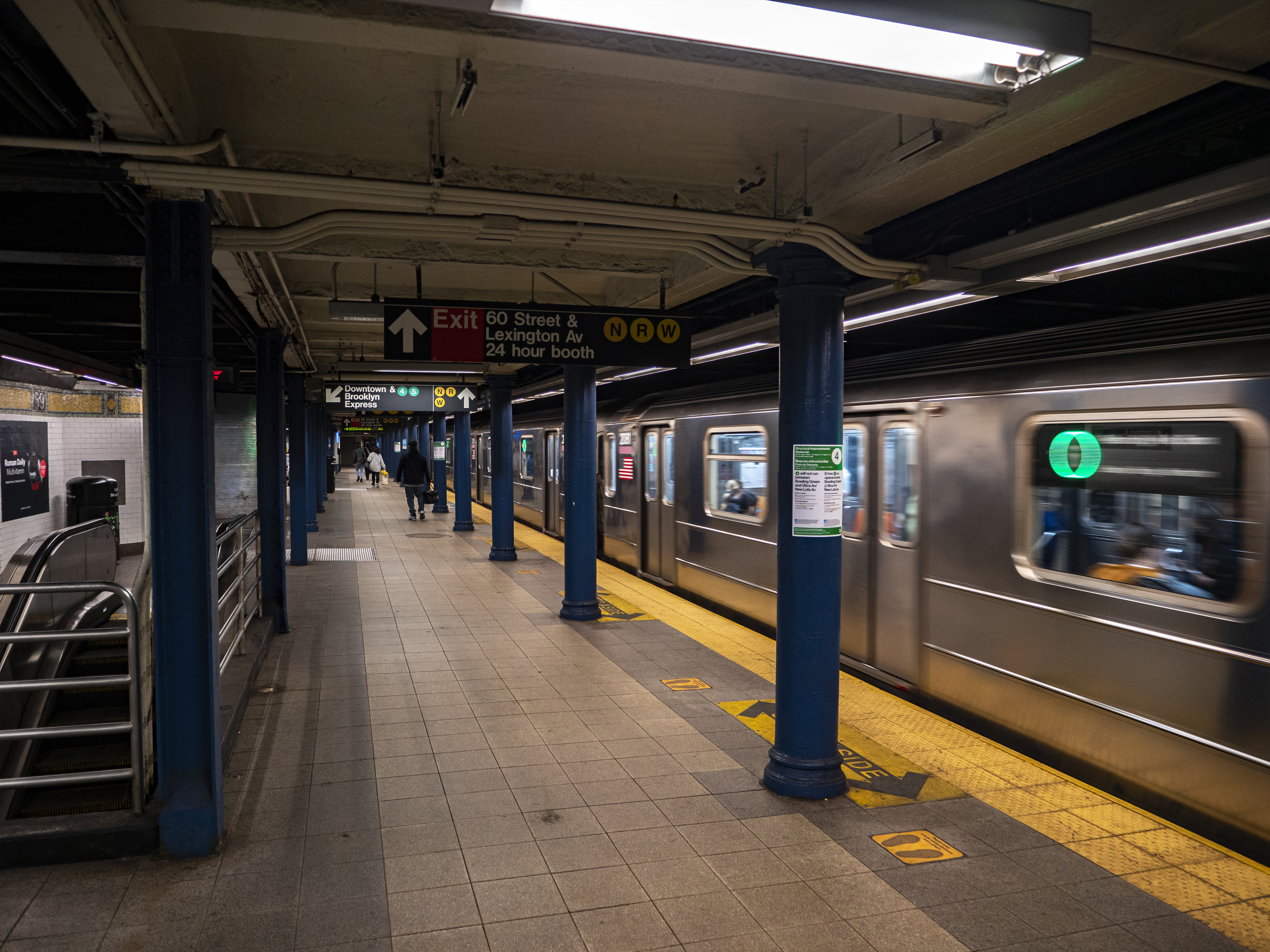
- A southbound local R62A 6 train leaving the upper level

Station statistics
- Division: A (IRT)
- Line: IRT Lexington Avenue Line
- Services: 4 (all times); 5 (all times except late nights); 6 (all times) <6> (weekdays until 8:45 p.m., peak direction)
- Levels: 2
- Platforms: 4 side platforms (2 on each level)
- Tracks: 4 (2 on each level)

Other information
- Opened: July 17, 1918; 108 years ago (upper level); November 15, 1962; 64 years ago (lower level)
- Accessible: No; planned (Elevator within Bloomingdale's store leads to the northbound platform during the store's operating hours)
Services
Preceding station	New York City Subway	Following station
86th Street 4 5 via 138th Street–Grand Concourse	Express	Grand Central–42nd Street 4 5 via Franklin Avenue–Medgar Evers College
68th Street–Hunter College 4 6 <6> toward Pelham Bay Park	Local	51st Street 4 6 <6> toward Brooklyn Bridge–City Hall
Track layout
Upper level
Lower level
Station service legend
Symbol	Description
Stops all times except late nights	Stops all times except late nights
Stops all times	Stops all times
Stops late nights only	Stops late nights only
Stops rush hours in the peak direction only	Stops rush hours in the peak direction only

The 59th Street station on the IRT Lexington Avenue Line is an express station. It has two stacked levels, each of which has two tracks and two side platforms. Departing passengers are asked to watch the gap upon leaving the train at this station. Local trains are on the upper level and express trains are on the lower one. The 4 and 6 trains stop here at all times; the 5 train stops here except at night; and the <6> train stops here in the peak direction only on weekdays during the day. The 5 train always makes express stops, and the 6 and <6> trains always make local stops; the 4 train makes express stops during the day and local stops during the night. The next station to the north is 68th Street–Hunter College for local trains and 86th Street for express trains. The next station to the south is 51st Street for local trains and Grand Central–42nd Street for express trains.

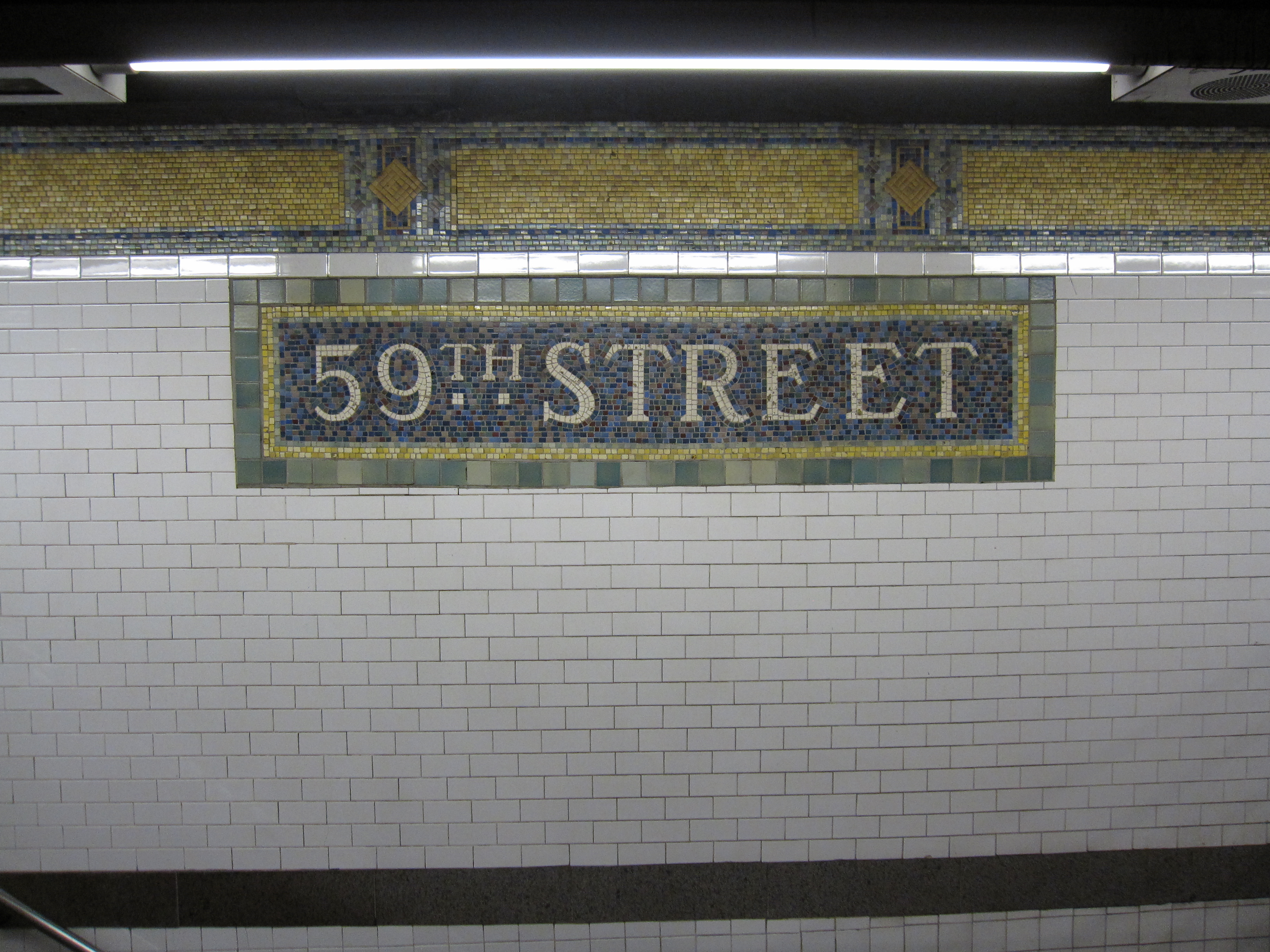
Station mosaic name tablet on the upper level

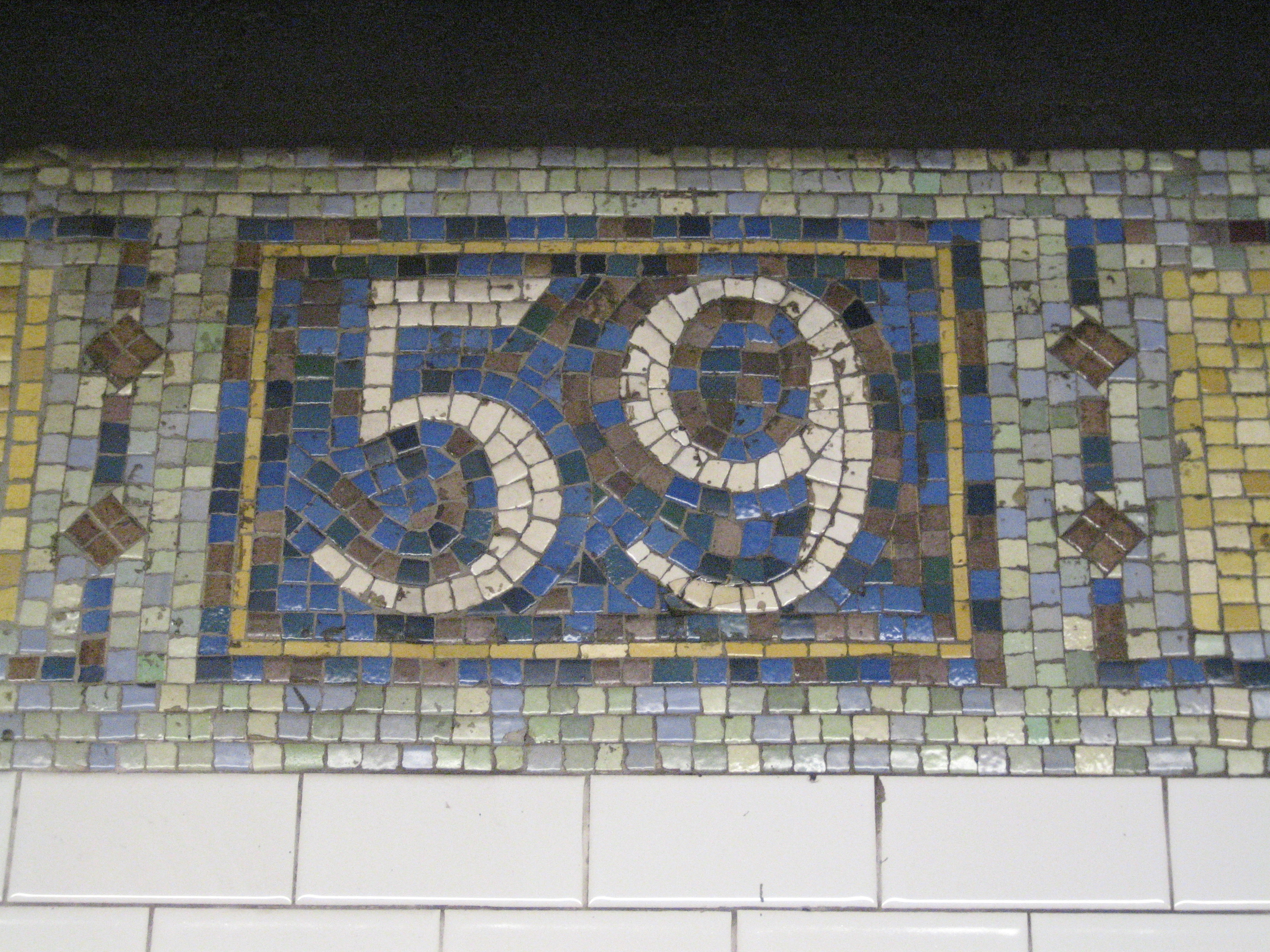
Mosaic frieze on the upper level

The station used to have all green tile which has been covered up except for one "59th Street" sign near the south end of the northbound platform. There are whimsical stylized mosaics of coffee cups and slippers in varied colors at random spacing near the stairways to the Broadway and IRT local trains.

There is a direct exit to Bloomingdale's from the uptown local platform's fare control. The underpass near the south end of the station was originally the northbound platform for the extension of the BMT Broadway Line to Queens. That line had been planned as two separate, one-track tunnels, one each under 59th and 60th Streets. Later on, it was decided to alter this layout in favor of a single two-track tunnel under 60th Street. The semi-completed platform under 59th Street was then converted to an underpass between the north and southbound platforms of the Lexington Avenue Line local tracks.

On the upper level, north of the station, there is a storage/lay up track between the two tracks. It ends at a bumper block at its north end. It merges with the two local tracks on its southern end.

=== Image gallery ===
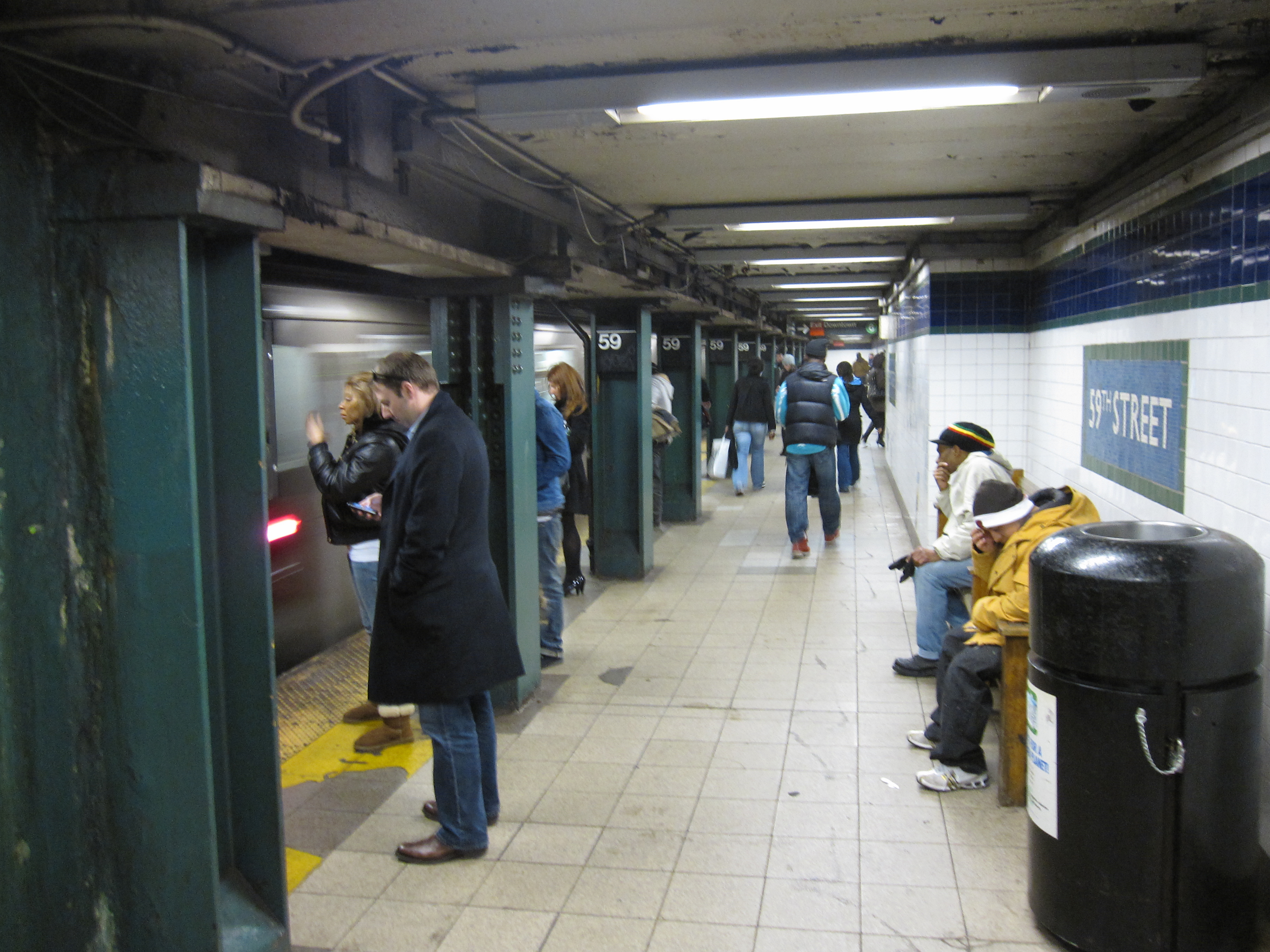
The Lexington Avenue lower-level express station, opened in 1962

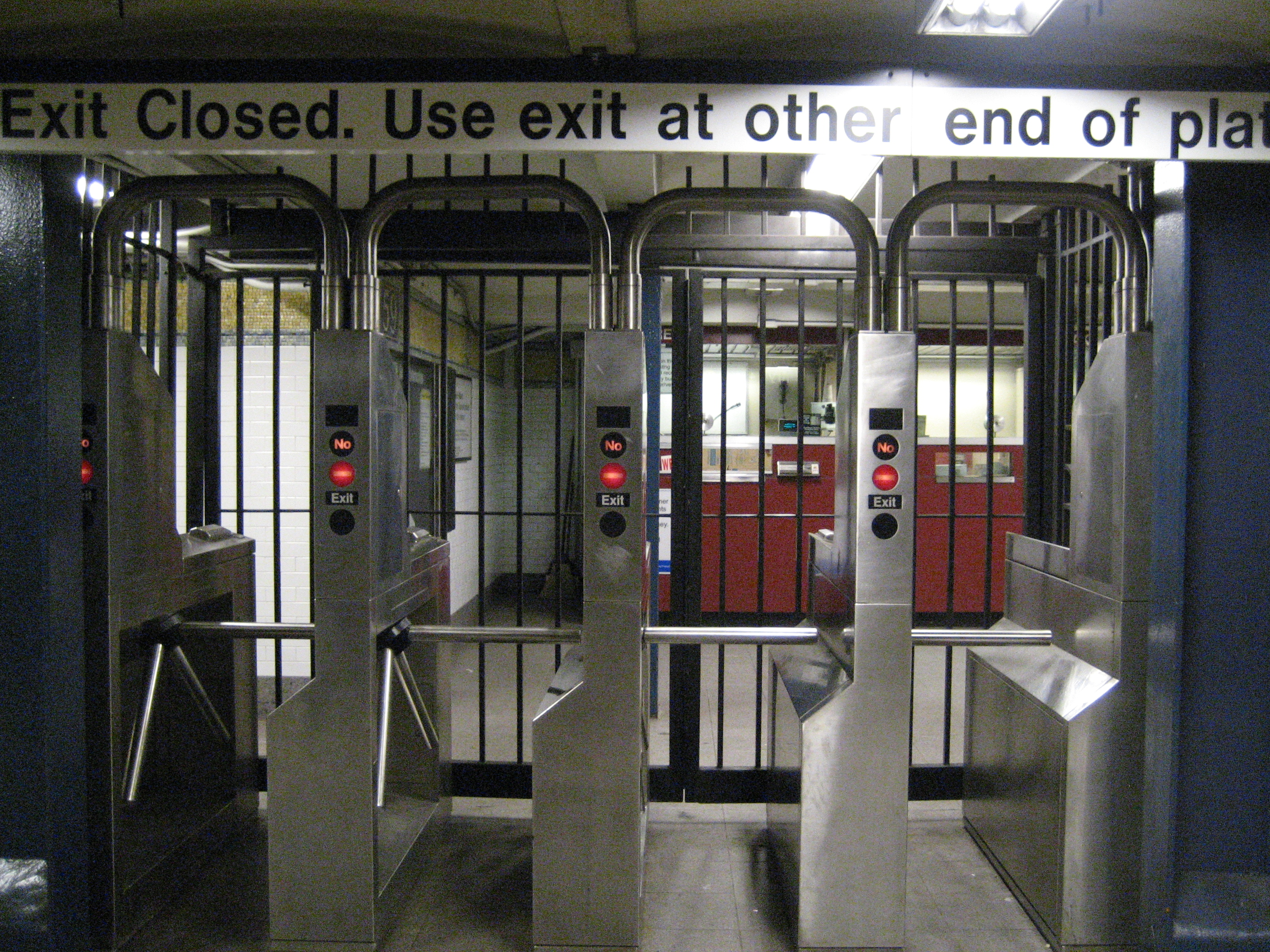
A new, still unused entrance/exit; it has since opened

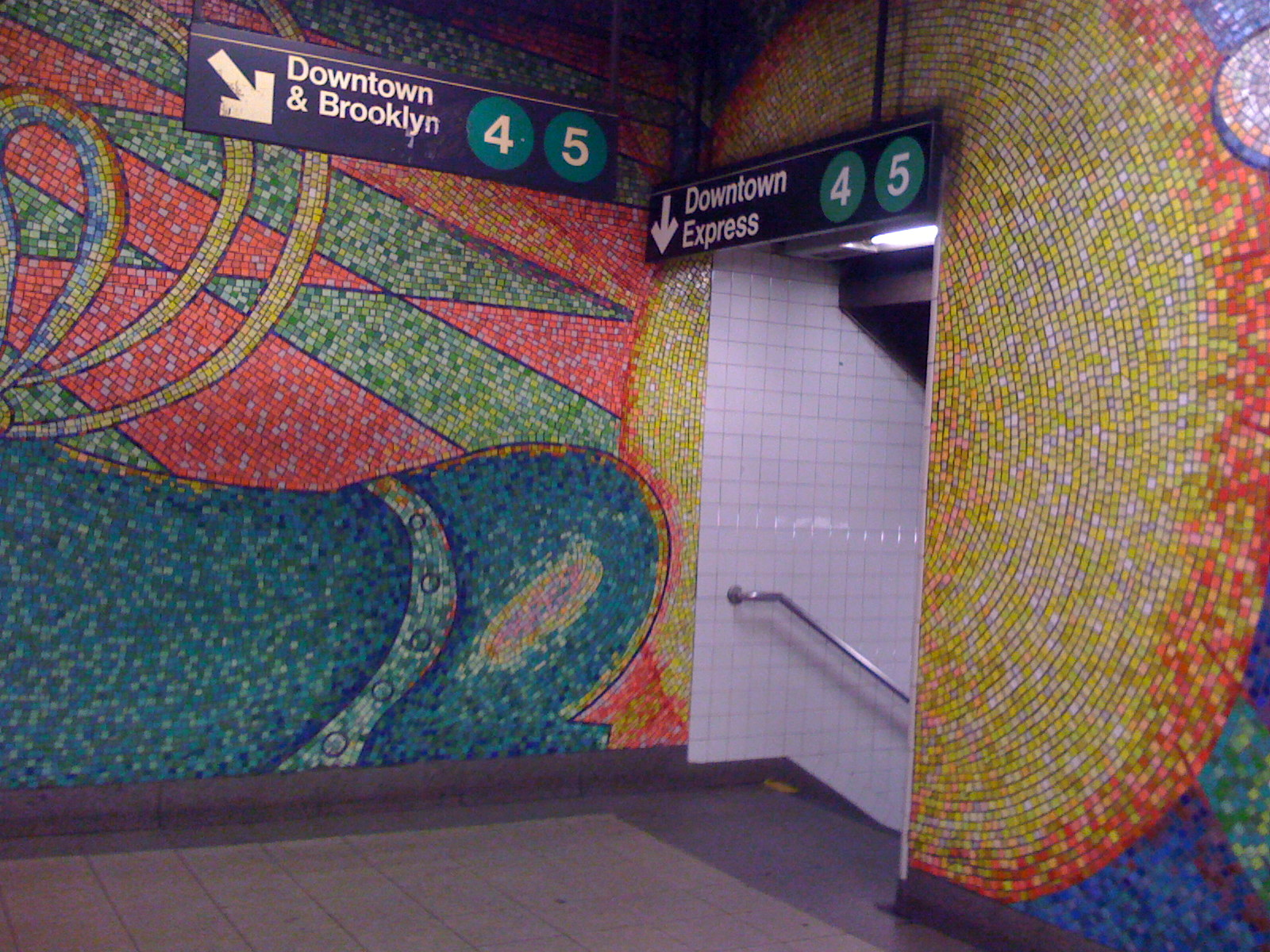
Elizabeth Murray's artwork

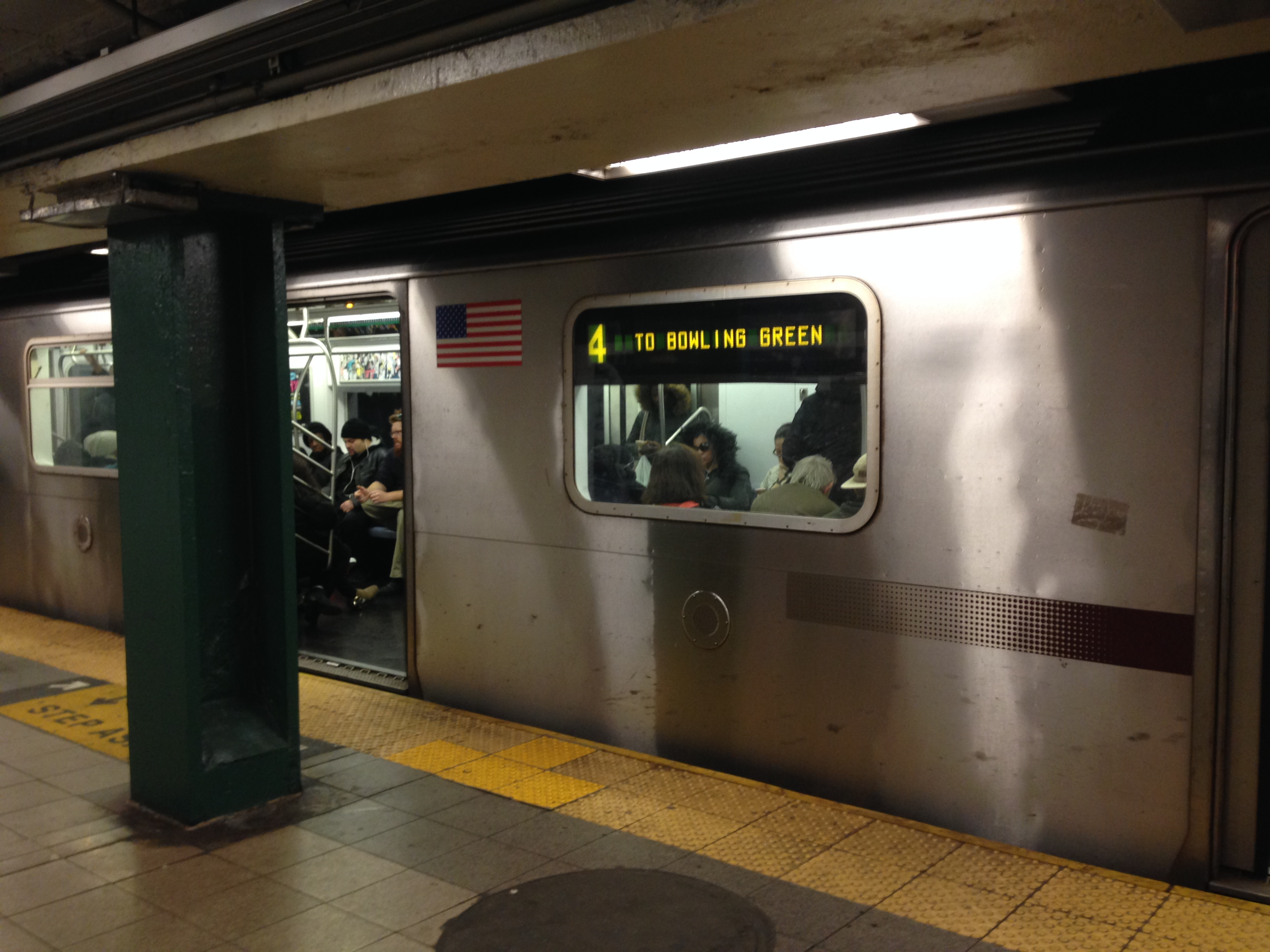
A 4 train made of R142 cars at the station, bound for Bowling Green

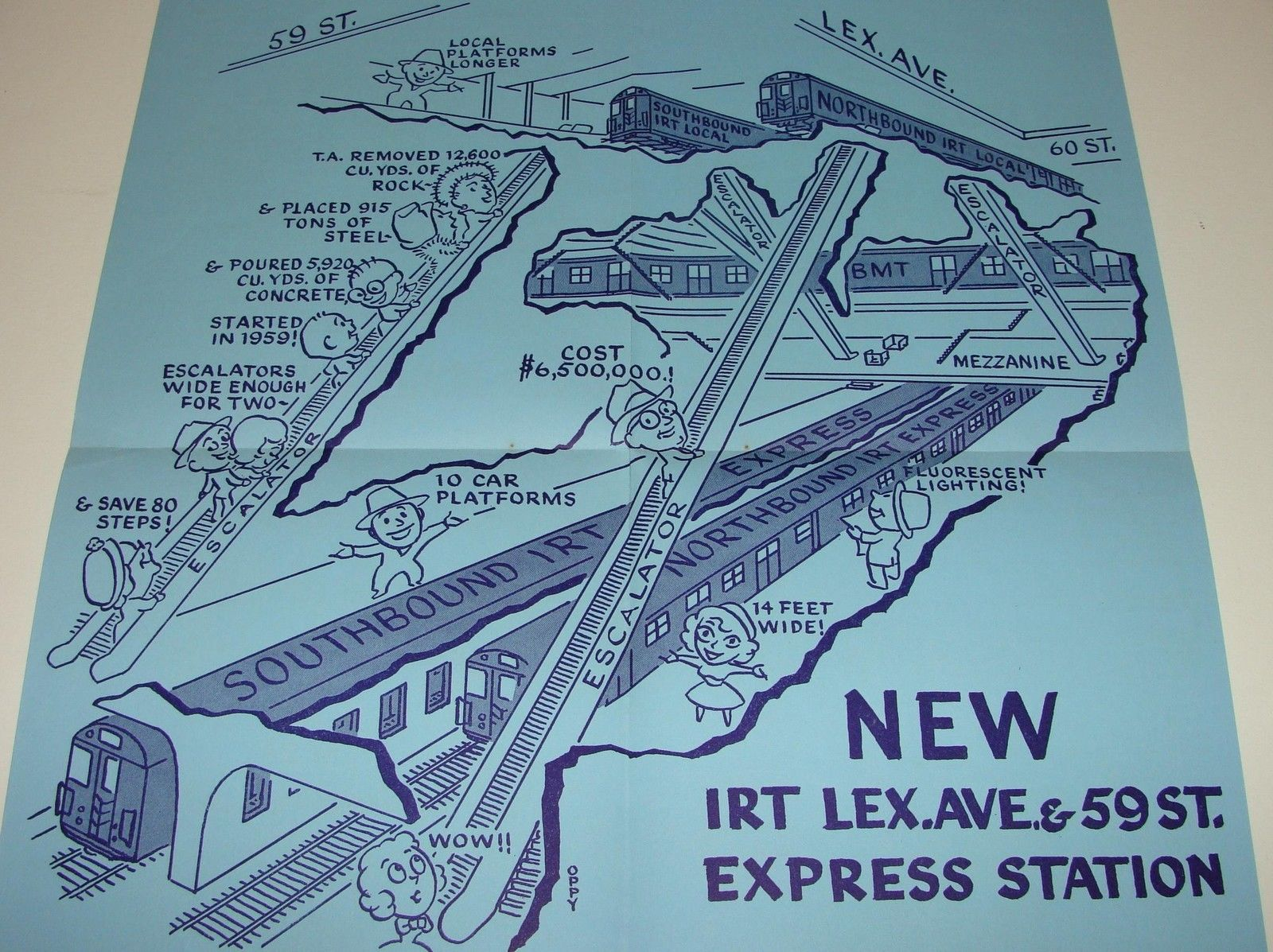
Brochure for the opening of the 59th Street express platforms

== BMT Broadway Line platform ==
Lexington Avenue−59 Street
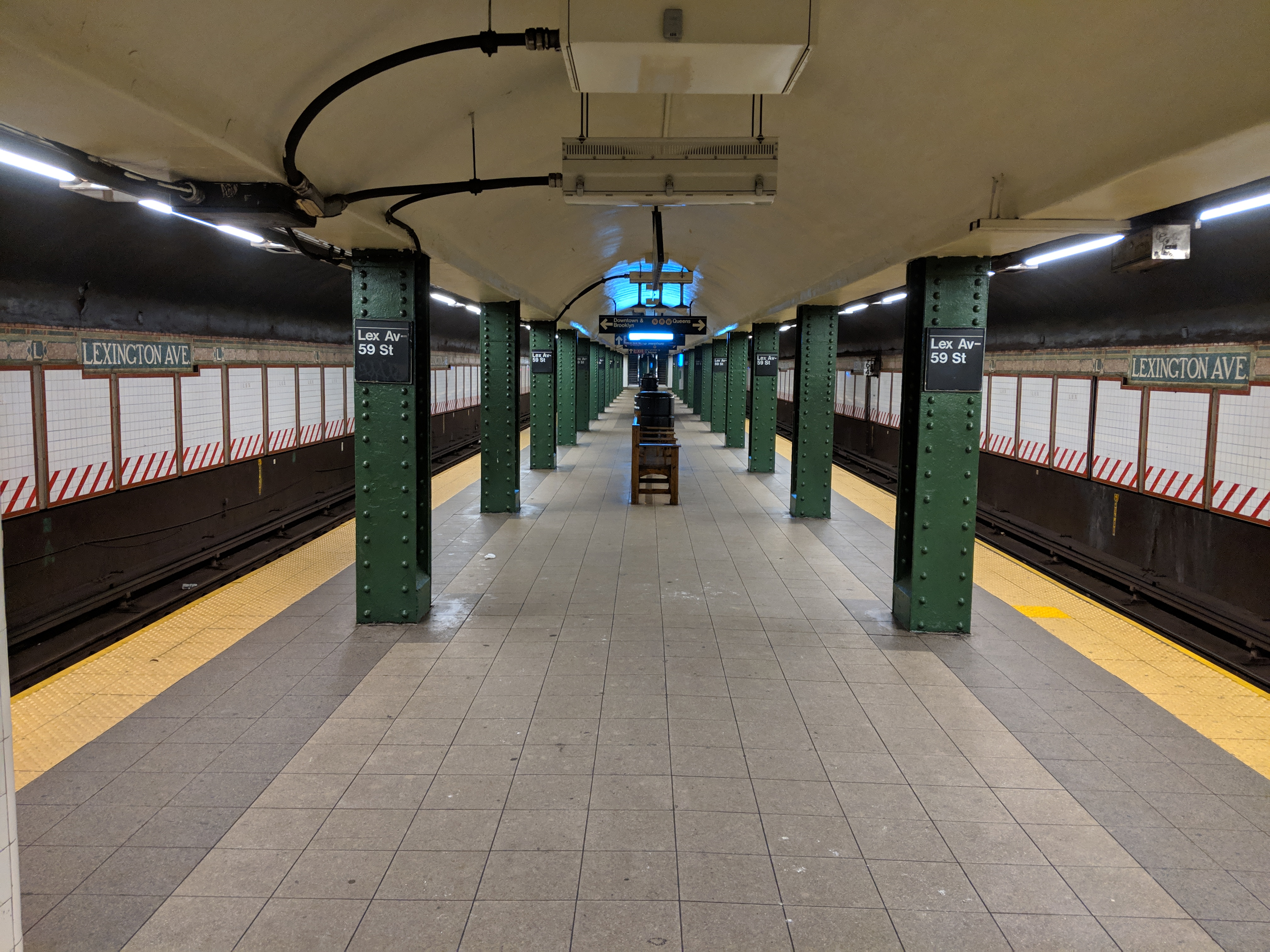
- Station platform

Station statistics
- Division: B (BMT)
- Line: BMT Broadway Line
- Services: N (all times); R (all times except late nights); W (weekdays only)
- Platforms: 1 island platform
- Tracks: 2

Other information
- Opened: September 1, 1919; 107 years ago
- Accessible: No; planned
- Accessibility: Same-platform transfer available
Services
Preceding station	New York City Subway	Following station
Fifth Avenue–59th Street N R W via Times Square–42nd Street	N (New York City Subway service) W (New York City Subway service)	Queensboro Plaza N W toward Astoria–Ditmars Boulevard
Fifth Avenue–59th Street N R W via Times Square–42nd Street	R (New York City Subway service)	Queens Plaza R toward Forest Hills–71st Avenue
Track layout
Station service legend
Symbol	Description
Stops all times except late nights	Stops all times except late nights
Stops all times	Stops all times
Stops weekdays during the day	Stops weekdays during the day

The Lexington Avenue−59th Street station on the BMT Broadway Line has two tracks and one island platform, and two mezzanines. The station is served by N trains at all times, R trains except at night and W trains only on weekdays during the day. The next stop to the east (railroad north) is Queensboro Plaza for N and W trains and Queens Plaza for R trains. The next stop to the west (railroad south) is Fifth Avenue–59th Street for all service.

The Lexington Avenue mezzanine has two staircases to each of the IRT local platforms, an escalator to the downtown platform, and three staircases down to the center level. The distinctive "Lex" mosaics were preserved during the renovation, by installing pre-arranged blocks along the station wall that cup the Lexington Avenue Line above it. The wall tiles have the red "Lex" evenly spaced out, similar to the IND style, with blue background, green borders, and white lettering. An entrance to Third Avenue, with red tiles, opened in October 1973. It has up and down escalators and an adjoining staircase, and is open part-time only, with four street staircases on Third Avenue.

Despite its name, the station is located on Lexington Avenue and 60th Street, one block north of 59th Street. Originally, the Broadway subway was to run to Queens over the Queensboro Bridge. Because the subway was to use the outer lanes of the Queensboro Bridge, the Queens-bound track was to run under 59th Street and the downtown-bound track under 60th Street. The Broadway subway plan was changed in 1915 to route both tracks into 60th Street and to cross the East River by a tunnel just north of the Queensboro Bridge. The 59th Street crossing was now useless, and at 60th Street, the subway would have to be at a lower grade on its way to the 60th Street Tunnel. The 59th Street crossing was converted into a pedestrian underpass for the IRT station, and is still in use for that purpose; its floor level is that of the never-completed BMT station. The 60th Street crossing was mostly destroyed when the existing station was built at a lower grade. A door in the southern wall across from the platform opens into a remaining unused space.
