= R (New York City Subway service) =

Rapid transit service

- Broadway Local

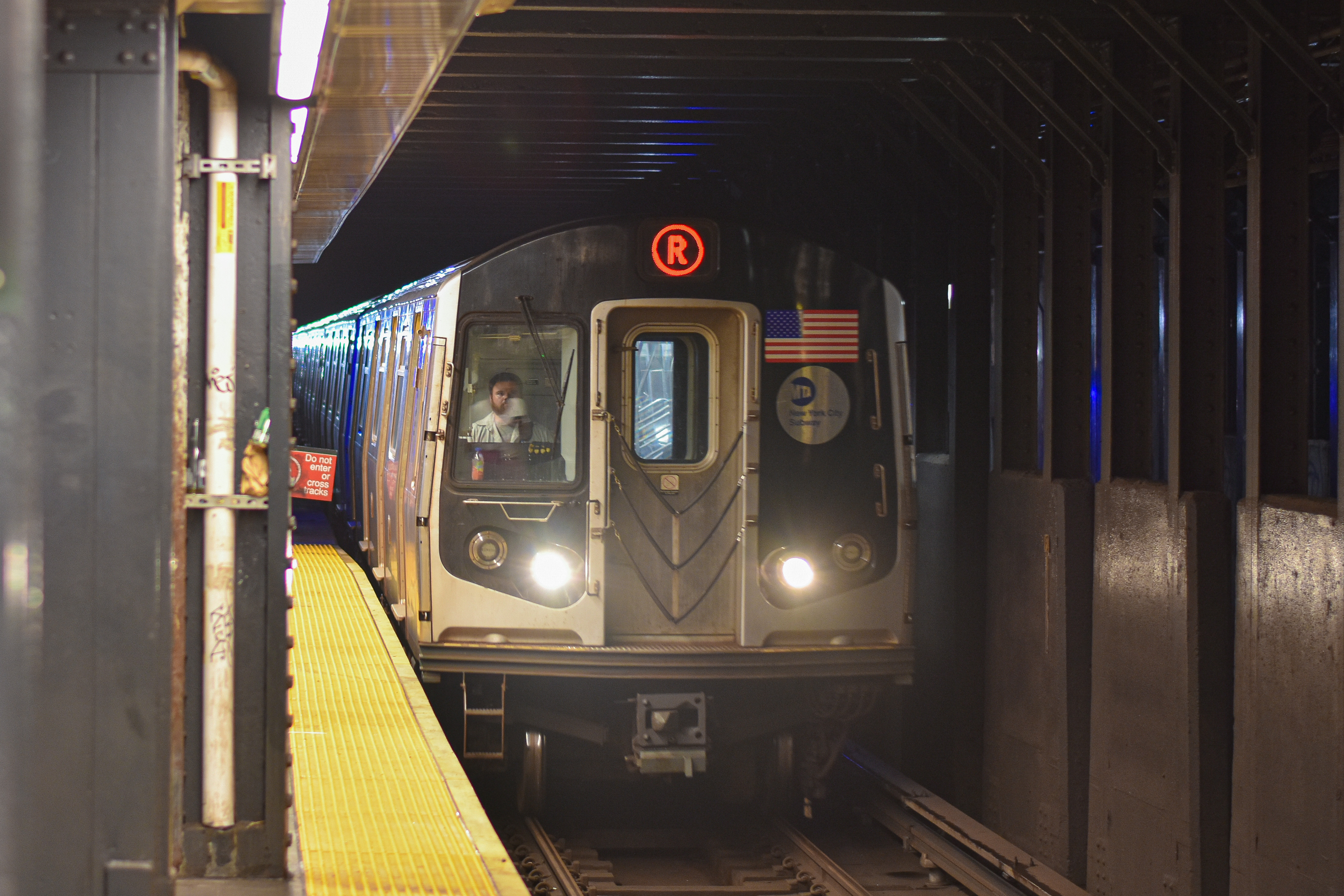
- A Manhattan-bound R train of R160s enters 53rd Street.

- Note: Dashed pink line shows limited rush hour service to 96th Street.
- Northern end: Forest Hills–71st Avenue (all times except late nights); Queens Plaza (evenings after 9:30 PM); Whitehall Street–South Ferry (late nights); 96th Street (one northbound AM trip)
- Southern end: Bay Ridge–95th Street (all times); Bay Parkway (one southbound AM trip)
- Stations: 45; 34 (limited service to 96th Street); 41 (limited service to Bay Parkway); 17 (late night service)
- Rolling stock: R160 (one a.m. trainset is used in both Q and R service, but is shown in the R assignment) (Rolling stock assignments subject to change)
- Depot: Jamaica Yard
- Started service: January 15, 1916; 110 years ago

The R Broadway Local (Note: The Metropolitan Transportation Authority's official text map gives the route's name as the "R Queens Boulevard/Broadway/4th Avenue Local".) is a rapid transit service in the B Division of the New York City Subway. Its route emblem, or "bullet", is colored yellow since it uses the BMT Broadway Line in Manhattan.

The R operates 24 hours daily, although service patterns vary based on the time of day. Daytime service operates between 71st Avenue in Forest Hills, Queens, and 95th Street in Bay Ridge, Brooklyn, making all stops along the full route; one northbound AM rush hour trip terminates at 96th Street on the Upper East Side of Manhattan instead of 71st Avenue in Queens; one southbound AM rush hour trip terminates at Bay Parkway instead of 95th Street in Brooklyn. Overnight service short turns at Whitehall Street-South Ferry in Lower Manhattan to and from Brooklyn and does not operate to or from 71st Avenue.

The R was originally the Brooklyn–Manhattan Transit Corporation's 2 service, running along the BMT Fourth Avenue Line in Brooklyn then traveling through the Montague Street Tunnel to Manhattan, then running local on the BMT Broadway Line. The 2 became the RR in 1961. The RR ran local along the BMT Astoria Line in Queens, terminating at Astoria–Ditmars Boulevard until it switched terminals with the N in 1987. The RR became the R in 1985. After 1987, the R ran via the IND Queens Boulevard Line to Forest Hills, Queens. A variant of the RR/R, from Bay Ridge to Chambers Street in Lower Manhattan via the BMT Nassau Street Line, ran from 1967 until 1987.

== History ==
=== Early history ===
The current R service is the successor to the original route 2 of the Brooklyn–Manhattan Transit Corporation. When 2 service began on January 15, 1916, it ran between Chambers Street on the BMT Nassau Street Line and 86th Street on the BMT Fourth Avenue Line, using the Manhattan Bridge to cross the East River, and running via Fourth Avenue local. Service on the BMT Broadway Line, which at the time ran only between Whitehall Street–South Ferry and Times Square–42nd Street, began exactly two years later on January 15, 1918. On July 10, 1919, service was extended to 57th Street–Seventh Avenue with the opening of that station.

The Montague Street Tunnel and the 60th Street Tunnel both opened on August 1, 1920. At that time, the 2 service was rerouted from the Manhattan Bridge to the Montague Street Tunnel, running local from Queensboro Plaza in Queens to 86th Street–Fourth Avenue in Brooklyn. The Bay Ridge–95th Street station opened on October 31, 1925, and became the service's new southern terminus. During this time, rush-hour specials to Chambers Street were sporadically added and removed, eventually becoming an addition to the line. At one time, including during 1931, additional midday service operated local between 57th Street and Whitehall Street–South Ferry. The 2 also used the Nassau Street Loop during rush hours, entering Manhattan via the Manhattan Bridge or Montague Street Tunnel and leaving via the other.

On October 17, 1949, the platform edges on the BMT Astoria Line had been shaved back to accommodate the larger BMT trains, and the BMT's Astoria Shuttle was replaced with service from the 2 Fourth Avenue Line operating from Astoria–Ditmars Boulevard in Astoria, Queens to Bay Ridge–95th Street in Brooklyn at all times. On June 29, 1950, special rush hour trains began running between Bay Ridge–95th Street and Chambers Street via the south side of the Manhattan Bridge and/or the Montague Street Tunnel. The special rush hour trains were discontinued two years later. On June 28, 1952, special service from 95th Street to the Nassau Street Line was discontinued on Saturdays.

=== 1960s–1970s changes ===
In the winter of 1960–61, letter designations started to appear on the route with the introduction of the R27s, which featured it on roll signs. The route was labeled the RR "Fourth Avenue Local via Tunnel". This was in accordance with the Independent Subway System's lettering system, which gave double letters to local trains and single letters to express trains. On January 1, 1961, the RR's northern terminus was relocated to its current location at Forest Hills–71st Avenue, via the BMT 60th Street Tunnel Connection, also known as the "11th Street Cut", and the IND Queens Boulevard Line. Night and weekend RR trains still terminated at 57th Street in Manhattan. Evening rush hour Fourth Avenue–Nassau trains went back to the routing that was used prior to 1959, in which trains ran from Broad Street to 95th Street via the Manhattan Bridge, and the Fourth Avenue express tracks.

On November 27, 1967, the day after the Chrystie Street Connection opened, the RR was moved back to Astoria–Ditmars Boulevard on the BMT Astoria Line. Replacing it on the Queens Boulevard Line was the new EE service, running weekdays only between Forest Hills–71st Avenue and Whitehall Street (with additional trains terminating at Canal Street). The Nassau Street specials, which could no longer run as a loop via the Manhattan Bridge, were through-routed from Bay Ridge–95th Street to 168th Street in Jamaica as RJ, along the route used today by the J and Z services. Under the first color scheme, RR was colored green and RJ was red. In the original Chrystie Street routing plans, the TA planned to totally eliminate the RR service, and maintain the RJ route as the main Bay Ridge service.

The RJ designation was only used from November 1967 until July 1, 1968, when it was cut back to Chambers Street and renamed as additional RR rush-hour peak-direction service. Because track connections between the Nassau Street Loop and the south tracks of the Manhattan Bridge were severed as part of the construction of the Chrystie Street Connection, these trains could not run in a loop anymore. On August 30, 1976, the EE was discontinued, with the N being extended to Forest Hills on weekdays to replace it.

On January 24, 1977, as part of a series of NYCTA service cuts to save $13 million, many subway lines began running shorter trains during middays. As part of the change, RR trains began running with six cars between 10:45 a.m. and 2:05 p.m.

In 1979, the MTA released a revised coloring scheme; RR service was assigned the color yellow (because it used the BMT Broadway Line). Although BMT Nassau Street Line services were colored brown, the rush hour RR service that used the Nassau Street Line was colored yellow, using a diamond bullet. The RR service via Nassau Street was referred to as the "Chambers Street Special".

=== 1980s–2000s changes ===
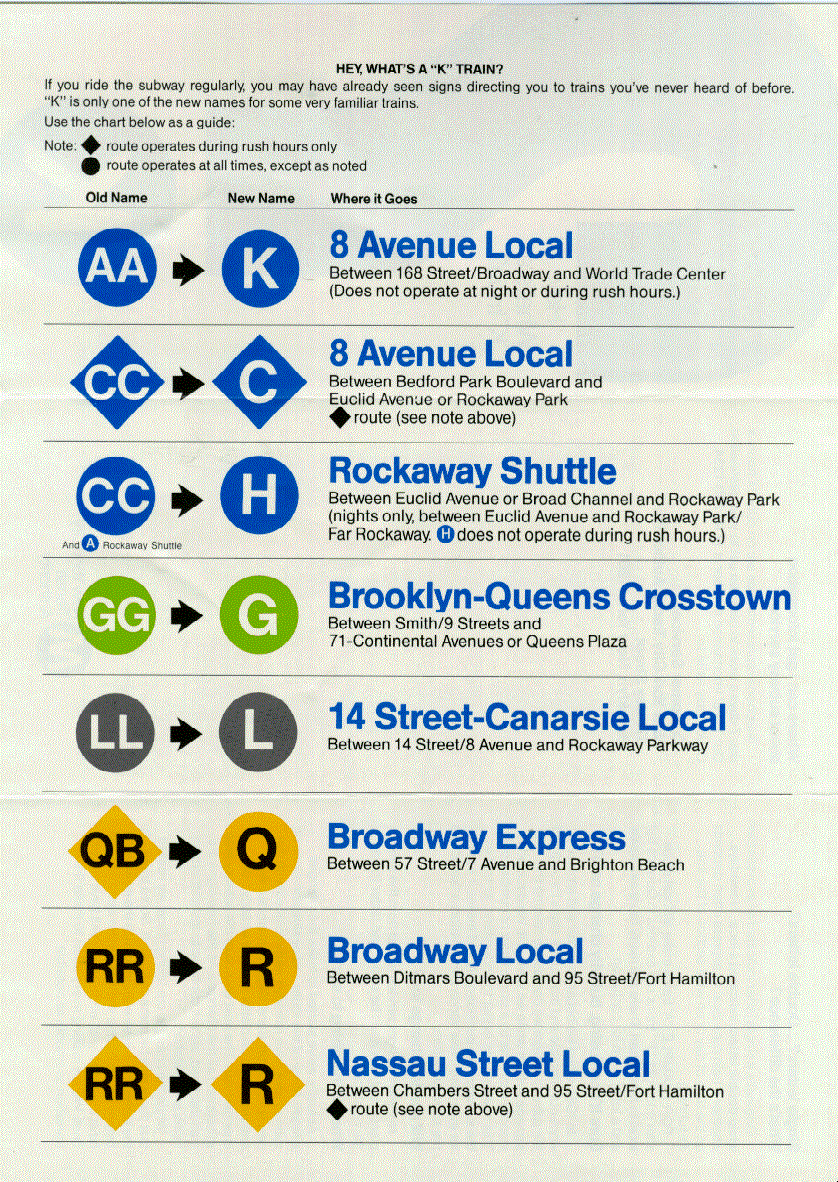
A brochure published in 1985 explaining the relabeling of double-letter subway services, including the RR's change to the R

On May 6, 1985, the MTA eliminated double letters for local service; the RR became the R. R service on the Broadway Line continued to use a yellow bullet, while the special Chambers Street–Bay Ridge rush-hour service was signed with a brown diamond with a white R inside, matching the J and M services using the BMT Nassau Street Line.

Starting on April 28, 1986, R service on the Nassau Street Line was extended to Metropolitan Avenue for layups and put-ins from Fresh Pond Yard. After the N/R swap, the Nassau R used East New York Yard equipment. This rush hour service was discontinued on November 20, 1987.

On May 24, 1987, the northern terminals of the N and R were swapped. The swap placed the R along the IND Queens Boulevard Line to Forest Hills–71st Avenue once again, with the N replacing it in Astoria. The change was made to give the R direct access to the Jamaica Yard (where the train is assigned to this day), and previously, R trains had to make non-passenger runs, or "deadheads", to/from the Coney Island Yard. As part of the reroute plan, F service along Queens Boulevard was discontinued during late nights (1 a.m. to 5 a.m.). Late night local service was replaced by the R, which ran as a Queens Boulevard Local at all times. F trains were cut back to 57th Street on the Sixth Avenue Line during late nights. In 1986, the TA studied which two services should serve the line during late nights as ridership at this time did not justify three services. A public hearing was held in December 1986, and it was determined that having the E and R run during late nights provided the best service.

On December 11, 1988, the Archer Avenue Lines opened, and the E was rerouted to its current terminus at Jamaica Center via the Queens Boulevard Line's express tracks. E trains began running express east of Continental Avenue, skipping 75th Avenue and Van Wyck Boulevard at all times. The R was extended from Continental Avenue to 179th Street to provide local service; this allowed F trains to continue running express to 179th Street, and F trains skipped 169th Street between 10 a.m. and 3:30 p.m. During the morning rush hour, four R trains went into service at Continental Avenue, because local ridership from 179th Street during rush hours did not warrant it. All R trains went to 179th Street during the afternoon rush to avoid taking loaded R trains out of service at Continental Avenue.

Two service plans were identified prior to a public hearing on February 25, 1988, concerning the service plan for the new extension. The first would have split rush-hour E service between the two branches, with late night service to 179th Street provided by the R, while the second would have had all E trains run via Archer Avenue and would have extended R locals to 179th Street. A modified version of the second plan was decided upon: some E trains would run from 179th Street instead of Archer Avenue during morning rush hours, though all E trains would run to Archer Avenue during the afternoon rush hour to reduce confusion for Queens-bound riders. The 1988 changes angered some riders because they resulted in the loss of direct Queens Boulevard Express service at local stations east of 71st Avenue—namely the 169th Street, Sutphin Boulevard, Van Wyck Boulevard and 75th Avenue stations. Local elected officials pressured the MTA to eliminate all-local service at these stations.

On June 10, 1990, overnight service was split instead of operating along the full route. The northern section operated between 179th Street in Queens and 34th Street–Herald Square in Manhattan; the southern section operated as a shuttle between 36th Street–Fourth Avenue and 95th Street in Brooklyn. As part of service cuts that went into effect on September 30, 1990, the R was cut back to 71st Avenue outside of rush hours, and overnight service no longer served Manhattan and Queens; overnight service operated as a shuttle in Brooklyn between 36th and 95th Streets. Local service between 179th Street and 71st Avenue outside of weekday rush hours was replaced by F trains during weekday midday and evening hours and weekend daytime hours; overnight local service between 179th Street and Queens Plaza was provided by G trains.

In 1992, the MTA considered three options to improve service at these local stops, including leaving service as is, having E trains run local east of 71st Avenue along with R service, and having F trains run local east of 71st Avenue replacing R service, which would be cut back to 71st Avenue at all times. The third option was chosen to be tested for six months starting in October or November 1992. On October 26, 1992, R trains were cut back to 71st Avenue at all times, and in its place, the F ran local east of 71st Avenue at all times, thus eliminating express service along Hillside Avenue. After the six months, the change was kept because there was minimal negative passenger reaction and because of the intensity of the request, even though 77% of passengers had benefited from the pre-October 1992 service plan. The change increased travel time along the F by 3 1/2 minutes, and reduced travel time for passengers at local stations by one to two minutes.

In October 2000, late-night shuttle trains in Brooklyn began skipping 53rd Street and 45th Street in the northbound direction. This was so shuttle trains could terminate more quickly at 36th Street on the Fourth Avenue Line, their northern terminal. Previously, all northbound B, N and R trains had stopped at the same track at 36th Street, which resulted in delays because it took several minutes for the R trains to be cleared.

After the September 11, 2001 attacks, R service was initially cut back from 71st Avenue to Court Street; service in Manhattan was provided by N, Q and W trains, and service in Queens was provided by E, F and G trains. On September 17, R service was completely suspended and was replaced by Q trains in Queens, by Q and W trains in Manhattan, and by J trains in Brooklyn. Normal R service was restored on October 28. Effective December 16, 2001, to accommodate new V service, the frequency of R service during the morning rush hour was decreased, with trains running every six minutes instead of every five minutes.

On September 8, 2002, Coney Island–Stillwell Avenue was closed for reconstruction. As a result, late night R service was extended to Pacific Street, running express between that station and 36th Street on the Fourth Avenue Line. On April 27, 2003, the frequency of Saturday morning and afternoon service was decreased, with trains running every 12 minutes instead of every 8 minutes. Trains also ran every 12 minutes on Sunday mornings and afternoons, instead of every 15 and 12 minutes on Sunday mornings, and every 10 and 8 minutes on Sunday afternoons. Late night service was cut back to 36th Street when the north side of the Manhattan Bridge reopened on February 22, 2004.

In December 2007, the MTA approved a service increase to allow R service to operate along the full route 24 hours daily. This service change would have gone into effect in December 2008; however, the 2008 financial crisis placed a hold on this service increase indefinitely.

=== 2010s and 2020s changes ===
After Hurricane Sandy flooded the subway system, the Montague Street Tunnel was completely flooded. When service was restored, the R was split into two sections (between Forest Hills and 34th Street–Herald Square at all times except late nights, and between Jay Street–MetroTech and Bay Ridge–95th Street at all times). On December 4, the Queens–Manhattan section was extended to Whitehall Street–South Ferry. On December 21, full service was restored between Manhattan and Brooklyn after the Montague Street Tubes were drained.

However, from August 2, 2013, to fall 2014, the tunnel was closed again so that extra repairs could be completed, bringing back similar storm changes to the R. On weekdays, the divided R ran in two sections: one section between Forest Hills and Whitehall Street–South Ferry, and the other between Court Street and Bay Ridge–95th Street. On weekends, the R ran its full route via the Manhattan Bridge, skipping all stations between Canal Street and DeKalb Avenue. The weekday service between Forest Hills and Whitehall Street essentially recreated the former EE route from 1967 to 1976. Originally slated to open by October 2014, the tunnel reopened a few weeks early, on September 15, 2014, and several million dollars under budget.

Beginning on November 5, 2016, overnight R service was extended north to Whitehall Street-South Ferry in order to provide a one-seat ride into Manhattan. This eliminated the need for northbound trains to skip 45th Street and 53rd Street in order to reverse on the express tracks at 36th Street–Fourth Avenue. The change took place on November 5, 2016. During late weekend evenings, every other R train short turned at Whitehall Street, resulting in waiting time doubling along the entire Brooklyn portion of the route. As part of the changes, these short-turns were extended to 95th Street.

Starting November 6, 2017, one northbound R trip was diverted to serve the then-new Second Avenue Subway in order to increase service on that line during the morning rush hour. In February 2019, in the midst of a transit crisis, several Bay Ridge politicians proposed splitting the R route in half, similar to the pattern enacted during the Montague Street Tunnel closures in 2013 and 2014, citing the route's length and unreliability. This proposal has been met with criticism from local riders, mostly because it would eliminate a one-seat ride into Manhattan.

On March 17, 2023, New York City Transit made adjustments to evening and late night E, F and R service to accommodate long-term CBTC installation on the Queens Boulevard Line between Union Turnpike and 179th Street. Evening R service originating from 95th Street after 8:30 pm on weekdays and after 9 pm on weekends was cut back from 71st Avenue to Queens Plaza. In August 2023, it was announced that midday headways on the R would be reduced to eight minutes although the MTA delayed the service increase until early 2024.

Effective July 7, 2025, one southbound R trip was rerouted after 36th Street to terminate at Bay Parkway on the West End Line. This change was implemented to avoid delays in N service due to merging conflicts, and was briefly tested for evaluation in February 2025. This trip makes express stops along the West End Line, stopping at Ninth Avenue and 62nd Street.

== Route ==
=== Signage history ===
Before 1985

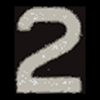
The BMT 2 bullet used on the D Triplex

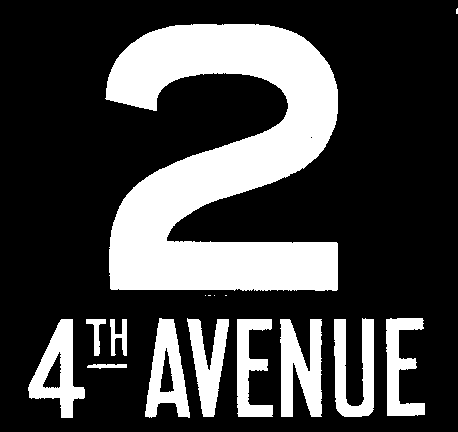
Pre-1967 BMT 2 bullet used on the R1s to R38s

1967-1968 RJ bullet

1967-1979 RR bullet

1979-1985 RR bullet

1979-1985 BMT Jamaica Line bullet
Post-1985

1986-1987 BMT Jamaica Line bullet

The current bullet used since 1985

=== Service pattern ===
The following table shows the lines used by the R, with shaded boxes indicating the route at the specified times:

Line	From	To	Tracks	Times		
Line	From	To	Tracks	rush hours	all ex. nights	late nights
IND Second Avenue Line	96th Street	72nd Street	all	One rush hour trip		
BMT 63rd Street Line (full line)	Lexington Avenue–63rd Street		all	One rush hour trip		
IND Queens Boulevard Line	Forest Hills–71st Avenue	Queens Plaza	local	Most trains		
60th Street Tunnel Connection and 60th Street Tunnel			all	Most trains		
BMT Broadway Line (full line)	Lexington Avenue/59th Street	49th Street	local	Most trains		
BMT Broadway Line (full line)	57th Street–Seventh Avenue	49th Street	express	One rush hour trip		
BMT Broadway Line (full line)	49th Street	Canal Street	local			
BMT Broadway Line (full line)	City Hall	Rector Street	all			
BMT Broadway Line (full line)	Whitehall Street–South Ferry		all			
Montague Street Tunnel			all			
BMT Fourth Avenue Line (full line)	Court Street	Bay Ridge–95th Street	local			
BMT West End Line	Ninth Avenue	Bay Parkway	express	One rush hour trip		

=== Stations ===
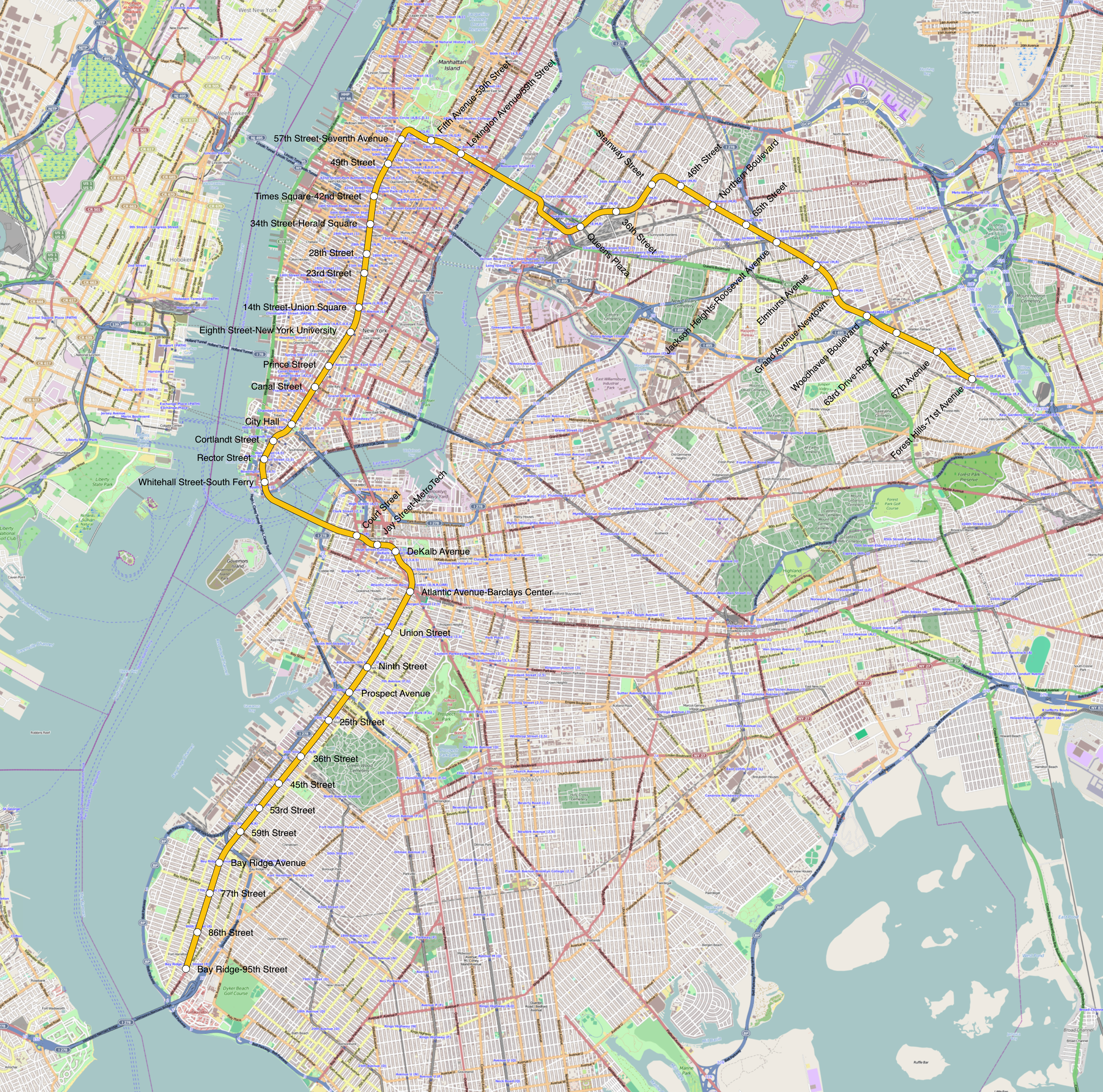
To scale line map

For a more detailed station listing, see the articles on the lines listed above.

Station service legend
Stops all times	Stops 24 hours a day
Stops all times except late nights	Stops every day during daytime hours only
Stops late nights only	Stops every day during overnight hours only
Stops late nights and weekends	Stops everyday during overnight hours and weekends during daytime hours only
Stops weekdays during the day	Stops during weekday daytime hours only
Stops all times except rush hours in the peak direction	Stops 24 hours a day, except during weekday rush hours in the peak direction
Stops rush hours only	Stops during weekday rush hours only
Station closed	Station closed
Stops rush hours in the peak direction only	Stops rush hours/weekdays in the peak direction only (including limited service)
Time period details
Disabled access	Station is compliant with the Americans with Disabilities Act
↑	Station is compliant with the Americans with Disabilities Act in the indicated direction only
↓	Station is compliant with the Americans with Disabilities Act in the indicated direction only
	Elevator access to mezzanine only

Reg.	BP	96th	Stations	Disabled access	Subway transfers	Connections and notes
Manhattan
Second Avenue Line (one rush hour trip only)
—N/a	—N/a	↑	96th Street	Disabled access	N Q	M15 Select Bus Service
—N/a	—N/a	↑	86th Street	Disabled access	N Q	M15 Select Bus Service; M86 Select Bus Service
—N/a	—N/a	↑	72nd Street	Disabled access	N Q	M15 Select Bus Service
63rd Street Line (one rush hour trip only)
—N/a	—N/a	↑	Lexington Avenue–63rd Street	Disabled access	F M N Q Out-of-system transfers with MetroCard/OMNY: 4 5 6 <6> (IRT Lexington Avenue Line at 59th Street); N R W (BMT Broadway Line at Lexington Avenue–59th Street)	
Queens
Queens Boulevard Line
Stops all times except late nights	↓	—N/a	Forest Hills–71st Avenue	Disabled access	E F <F> M	LIRR Main Line at Forest Hills
Stops all times except late nights	↓	—N/a	67th Avenue		M	
Stops all times except late nights	↓	—N/a	63rd Drive–Rego Park		M	Q72 bus to LaGuardia Airport
Stops all times except late nights	↓	—N/a	Woodhaven Boulevard		M	Q52/Q53 Select Bus Service
Stops all times except late nights	↓	—N/a	Grand Avenue–Newtown		M	Q53 Select Bus Service
Stops all times except late nights	↓	—N/a	Elmhurst Avenue		M	Q53 Select Bus Service
Stops all times except late nights	↓	—N/a	Jackson Heights–Roosevelt Avenue	Disabled access	7 (IRT Flushing Line); E F <F> M	Q33 bus to LaGuardia Airport Marine Air Terminal; Q53 Select Bus Service; Q70 Select Bus Service to LaGuardia Airport
Stops all times except late nights	↓	—N/a	65th Street		M	
Stops all times except late nights	↓	—N/a	Northern Boulevard	Disabled access	M	
Stops all times except late nights	↓	—N/a	46th Street		M	
Stops all times except late nights	↓	—N/a	Steinway Street		M	
Stops all times except late nights	↓	—N/a	36th Street		M	
Stops all times except late nights	↓	—N/a	Queens Plaza	Disabled access	E F <F>	Northern terminal for evening trains in the northbound direction only
Manhattan
Broadway Line
Stops all times except late nights	↓	—N/a	Lexington Avenue–59th Street		N W 4 5 6 <6> (IRT Lexington Avenue Line at 59th Street); Out-of-system transfer with MetroCard/OMNY: F M N Q R (63rd Street Lines at Lexington Avenue–63rd Street)	Roosevelt Island Tramway
Stops all times except late nights	↓	—N/a	Fifth Avenue–59th Street		N W	
Services to 96th Street (Manhattan) and Forest Hills–71st Avenue (Queens) split
Broadway Line (Queens Boulevard and Second Avenue branches merge)
Stops all times except late nights	↓	↑	57th Street–Seventh Avenue	Disabled access	N Q W	
Stops all times except late nights	↓	↑	49th Street	↑	N W	Station is ADA-accessible in the northbound direction only.
Stops all times except late nights	↓	↑	Times Square–42nd Street	Disabled access	N Q W 1 2 3 (IRT Broadway–Seventh Avenue Line); 7 <7> (IRT Flushing Line); A C E (IND Eighth Avenue Line at 42nd Street–Port Authority Bus Terminal); S (42nd Street Shuttle); B D F <F> M (IND Sixth Avenue Line at 42nd Street–Bryant Park, daytime only)	Port Authority Bus Terminal; M34A Select Bus Service
Stops all times except late nights	↓	↑	34th Street–Herald Square	Disabled access	N Q W B D F <F> M (IND Sixth Avenue Line)	M34 / M34A Select Bus Service; PATH at 33rd Street; Amtrak, LIRR, NJ Transit at Pennsylvania Station
Stops all times except late nights	↓	↑	28th Street		N W	
Stops all times except late nights	↓	↑	23rd Street		N W	M23 Select Bus Service
Stops all times except late nights	↓	↑	14th Street–Union Square	Disabled access	N Q W L (BMT Canarsie Line); 4 5 6 <6> (IRT Lexington Avenue Line)	M14A/D Select Bus Service
Stops all times except late nights	↓	↑	Eighth Street–New York University		N W	
Stops all times except late nights	↓	↑	Prince Street		N W	
Stops all times except late nights	↓	↑	Canal Street	Elevator access to mezzanine only	N Q W 6 <6> (IRT Lexington Avenue Line); J Z (BMT Nassau Street Line)	Stops on the upper level
Stops all times except late nights	↓	↑	City Hall		W	
Stops all times except late nights	↓	↑	Cortlandt Street	Disabled access	W 2 3 (IRT Broadway–Seventh Avenue Line at Park Place); A C (IND Eighth Avenue Line at Chambers Street); E (IND Eighth Avenue Line at World Trade Center)	PATH at World Trade Center
Stops all times except late nights	↓	↑	Rector Street		W	
Stops all times	↓	↑	Whitehall Street–South Ferry	Elevator access to mezzanine only	N W 1 (IRT Broadway–Seventh Avenue Line at South Ferry)	M15 Select Bus Service; Staten Island Ferry at Whitehall Terminal; Northern terminal for late night trains
Brooklyn
Fourth Avenue Line
Stops all times	↓	↑	Court Street	Elevator access to mezzanine only	N W 2 3 (IRT Broadway–Seventh Avenue Line at Borough Hall); 4 5 (IRT Eastern Parkway Line at Borough Hall)	
Stops all times	↓	↑	Jay Street–MetroTech	Disabled access	N W A C F <F> (IND Fulton Street and Culver Lines)	
Stops all times	↓	↑	DeKalb Avenue	Disabled access	B D N Q W	
Stops all times	↓	↑	Atlantic Avenue–Barclays Center	Disabled access	D N W B Q (BMT Brighton Line); 2 3 4 5 (IRT Eastern Parkway Line)	LIRR Atlantic Branch at Atlantic Terminal
Stops all times	↓	↑	Union Street		D N W	
Stops all times	↓	↑	Ninth Street		D N W F G (IND Culver Line at Fourth Avenue)	
Stops all times	↓	↑	Prospect Avenue		D N W	
Stops all times	↓	↑	25th Street		D N W	
Stops all times	↓	↑	36th Street		D N W	Some rush hour trips (southbound in the morning, northbound in the afternoon) begin their runs at this station
West End Line (one rush hour trip only)
—N/a	↓	—N/a	Ninth Avenue		D W	
—N/a	↓	—N/a	62nd Street	Disabled access	D W N W (BMT Sea Beach Line at New Utrecht Avenue)	
—N/a	↓	—N/a	Bay Parkway	Disabled access	D W	B82 Select Bus Service
Fourth Avenue Line
Stops all times	—N/a	↑	45th Street		N W	
Stops all times	—N/a	↑	53rd Street		N W	
Stops all times	—N/a	↑	59th Street	Disabled access	N W	Some southbound a.m. rush hour trips terminate at this station
Stops all times	—N/a	↑	Bay Ridge Avenue			
Stops all times	—N/a	↑	77th Street			
Stops all times	—N/a	↑	86th Street	Disabled access		S79 Select Bus Service
Stops all times	—N/a	↑	Bay Ridge–95th Street	Disabled access		
