= 57th Street–Seventh Avenue station =

New York City Subway station in Manhattan

57 Street–7 Avenue
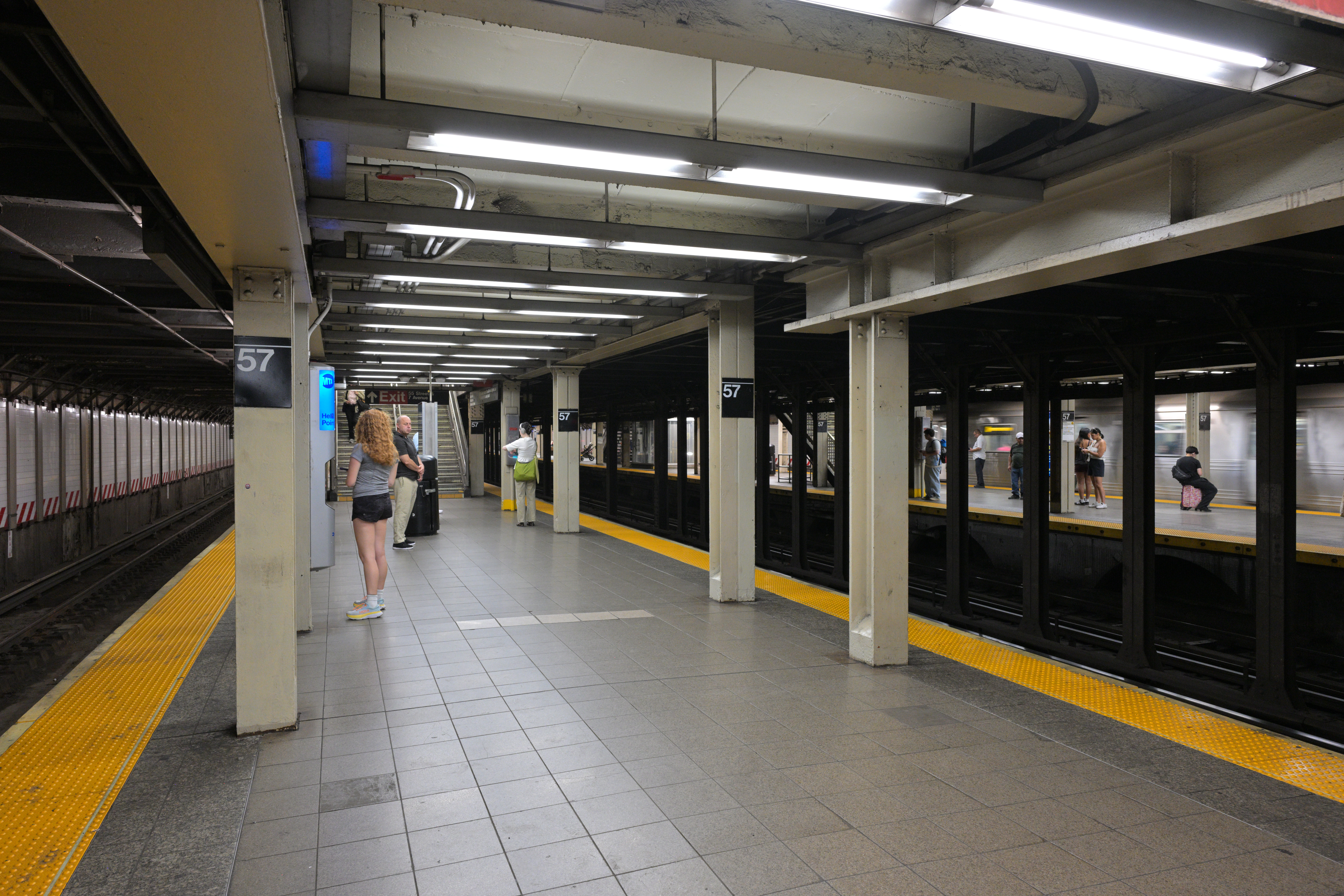
- The downtown island platform, with the uptown platform in the background

Station statistics
- Address: West 57th Street & Seventh Avenue; New York, New York
- Borough: Manhattan
- Locale: Midtown Manhattan
- Coordinates: 40°45′56″N 73°58′48″W
- Division: B (BMT)
- Line: BMT Broadway Line
- Services: N (all times); Q (all times); R (all except late nights); W (weekdays only)
- Transit: NYCT Bus: M7, M20, M31, M57; MTA Bus: BxM2
- Structure: Underground
- Platforms: 2 island platforms cross-platform interchange
- Tracks: 4

Other information
- Opened: July 10, 1919 (107 years ago)
- Accessible: Yes (Accessible entrance only provided at northeast corner of 55th Street and 7th Avenue; entrance at the southwest corner of 57th Street and 7th Avenue is not accessible)
- Former/other names: Midtown–57th Street

Traffic
- 2025: 8,709,553 ▲4.7%
- Rank: 24 out of 423
Services
| Preceding station | New York City Subway | Following station |
|---|---|---|
| Lexington Avenue–63rd Street N Q R toward 96th Street | Express | Times Square–42nd Street N Q toward Coney Island–Stillwell Avenue |
| Fifth Avenue–59th Street N R W via Lexington Avenue–59th Street | Local | 49th Street N Q R W via Times Square–42nd Street |
Location
Location within New York City Subway
Location within New York City
Location within New York
Track layout
Street map
Station service legend
| Symbol | Description |
| Stops all times except late nights | Stops all times except late nights |
| Stops all times | Stops all times |
| Stops weekdays during the day | Stops weekdays during the day |
| Stops rush hours only (limited service) | Stops rush hours only (limited service) |
| Stops rush hours in the peak direction only (limited service) | Stops rush hours in the peak direction only (limited service) |

The 57th Street–Seventh Avenue station (signed as the 57th Street station) is an express station on the BMT Broadway Line of the New York City Subway. Located in Midtown Manhattan at the intersection of 57th Street and Seventh Avenue, it is served by the N and Q trains at all times, the R train at all times except late nights, and the W train on weekdays. It is directly adjacent to Carnegie Hall.

== History ==
=== Construction and opening ===
The New York Public Service Commission adopted plans for what was known as the Broadway–Lexington Avenue route on December 31, 1907. This route began at the Battery and ran under Greenwich Street, Vesey Street, Broadway to Ninth Street, private property to Irving Place, and Irving Place and Lexington Avenue to the Harlem River. After crossing under the Harlem River into the Bronx, the route split at Park Avenue and 138th Street, with one branch continuing north to and along Jerome Avenue to Woodlawn Cemetery, and the other heading east and northeast along 138th Street, Southern Boulevard, and Westchester Avenue to Pelham Bay Park. In early 1908, the Tri-borough plan was formed, combining this route, the under-construction Centre Street Loop Subway in Manhattan and Fourth Avenue Subway in Brooklyn, a Canal Street subway from the Fourth Avenue Subway via the Manhattan Bridge to the Hudson River, and several other lines in Brooklyn.

The Brooklyn Rapid Transit Company submitted a proposal to the Commission, dated March 2, 1911, to operate the Tri-borough system (but under Church Street instead of Greenwich Street), as well as a branch along Broadway, Seventh Avenue, and 59th Street from Ninth Street north and east to the Queensboro Bridge; the Canal Street subway was to merge with the Broadway Line instead of continuing to the Hudson River. The city, the BRT, and the Interborough Rapid Transit Company (which operated the first subway and four elevated lines in Manhattan) came to an agreement, and sent a report to the New York City Board of Estimate on June 5, 1911. The line along Broadway to 59th Street was assigned to the BRT, while the IRT obtained the Lexington Avenue line, connecting with its existing route at Grand Central–42nd Street. Construction began on Lexington Avenue on July 31, and on Broadway the next year. The Dual Contracts, two operating contracts between the city and the BMT and IRT, were adopted on March 4, 1913. Operation of the Broadway Line was assigned to the Brooklyn Rapid Transit Company (BRT; after 1923, the Brooklyn–Manhattan Transit Corporation or BMT) in the Dual Contracts, adopted on March 4, 1913.

This station opened on July 10, 1919. Initially, the station was only served by local trains from Brooklyn, whereas express trains terminated at Times Square.

=== Later modifications ===
The station was operated by the BMT until the city government took over the BMT's operations on June 1, 1940. This station underwent an overhaul in the late 1970s, which included fixing the station's structure and replacing the original wall tiles, old signs, and incandescent lighting with 1970s modern-look wall tile band and tablet mosaics, signs and fluorescent lights. Staircases and platform edges were also repaired.

In 2023, a short barrier was installed at the center of the platforms to reduce the probability of passengers being pushed into the tracks. In 2026, as part of the Zoning for Accessibility program, private developer Extell Development received permission to build a new entrance at the 57th Street–Seventh Avenue station, to be included in a tower that it was constructing on the site of the Hotel Wellington. Extell also agreed to fund accessibility upgrades at the nearby 50th Street station, in exchange for being allowed to increase the size of the tower.

==== Elevators ====
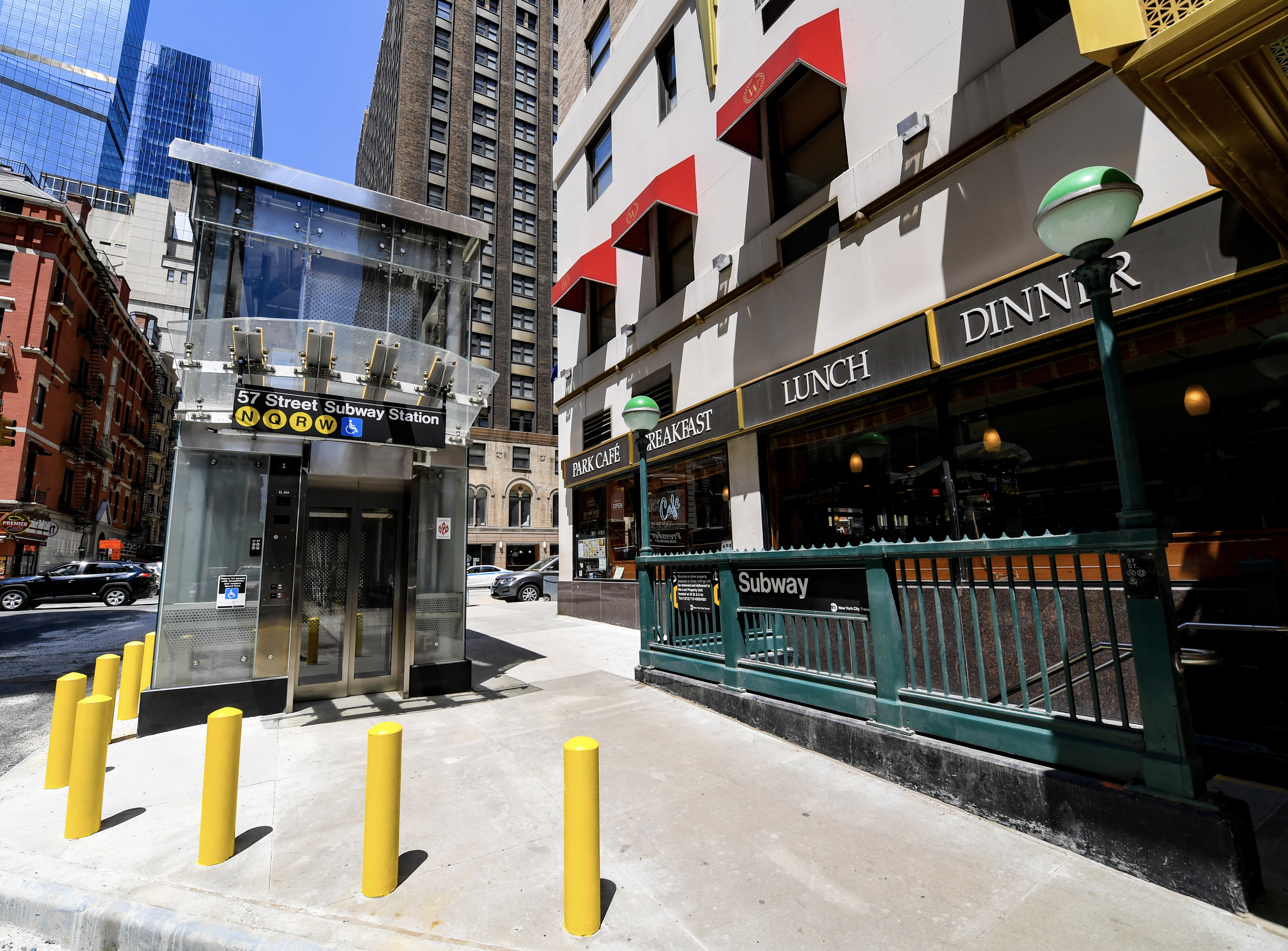
55th Street elevator, which is ADA-accessible

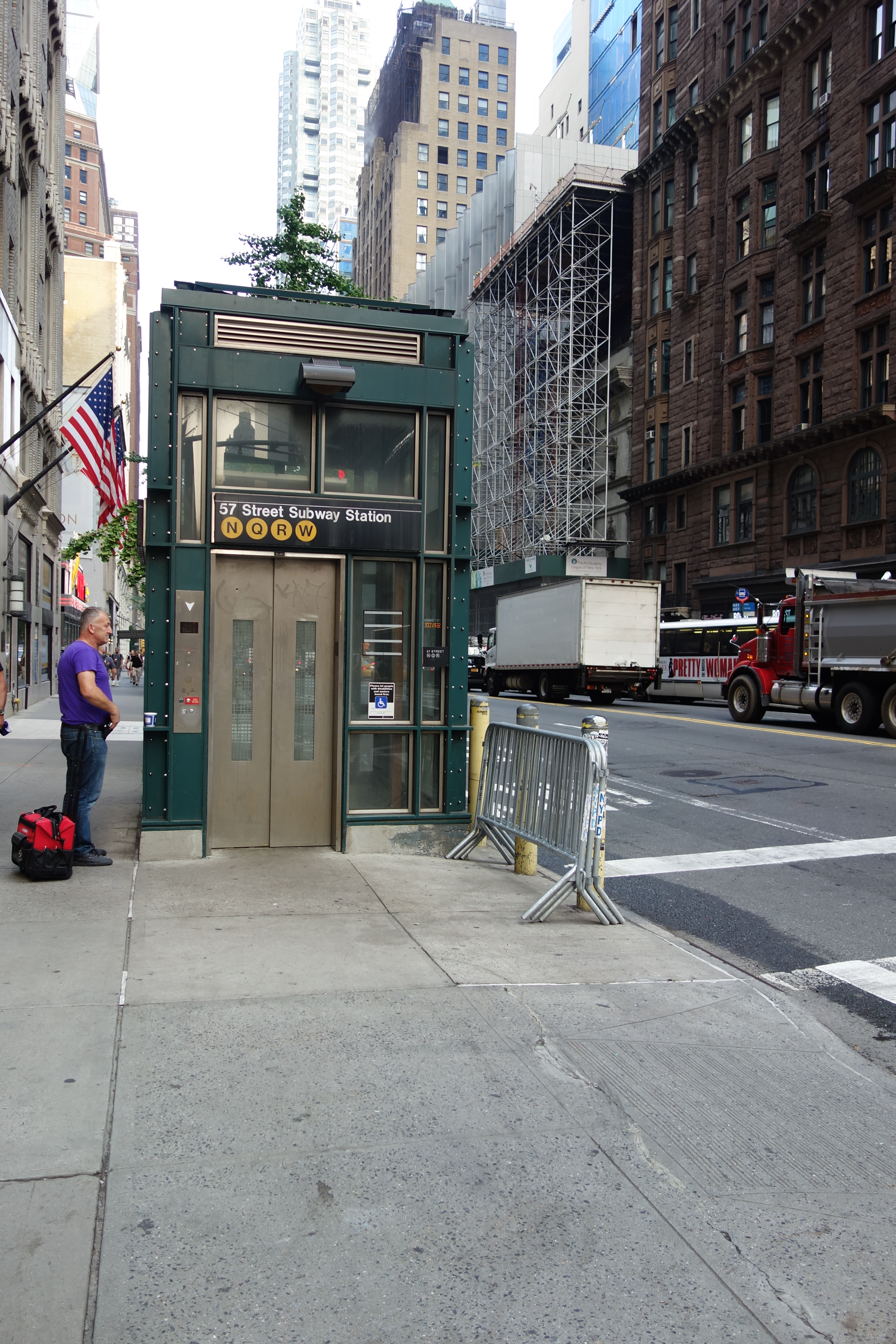
57th Street elevator, which is not ADA-accessible

In 1992–1993, the station received a major overhaul with state-of-the-art repairs as well as upgrading the station for ADA compliance. The original late 1910s tiling was restored, repairs were made to the staircases, new tiling on the floors, upgrades to the station's lights and public address system, installation of ADA safety treads along the platform edge, new signs, and new trackbeds in both directions. Accessibility to the mezzanine was further increased by the addition of a usable elevator on the southwest corner of 57th Street, which allowed disabled access to the fare booth and MetroCard (later OMNY) vending machines. Initially, no elevators were installed from the mezzanine to the platforms; the MTA intended to provide ADA access to the platforms as part of its 2010–2014 Capital Plan.

Elevators to the platforms had been under design for several years, with the MTA originally planning to award contracts in November 2013, but the design process was delayed because of preexisting utilities blocking the way of the proposed elevator access. Other issues included asbestos abatement, the lack of available space underground for the expansion of the mezzanine, and the need to negotiate with another developer to install elevators. The MTA started working on a revised design in September 2015, and the construction contract was awarded in December 2017, allowing the start of construction. Ultimately, the location of the platform elevators was moved to the southern end of the station, near 55th Street, necessitating the installation of a new street-to-mezzanine elevator at 55th Street. The elevators were opened in May 2021.

== Station layout ==
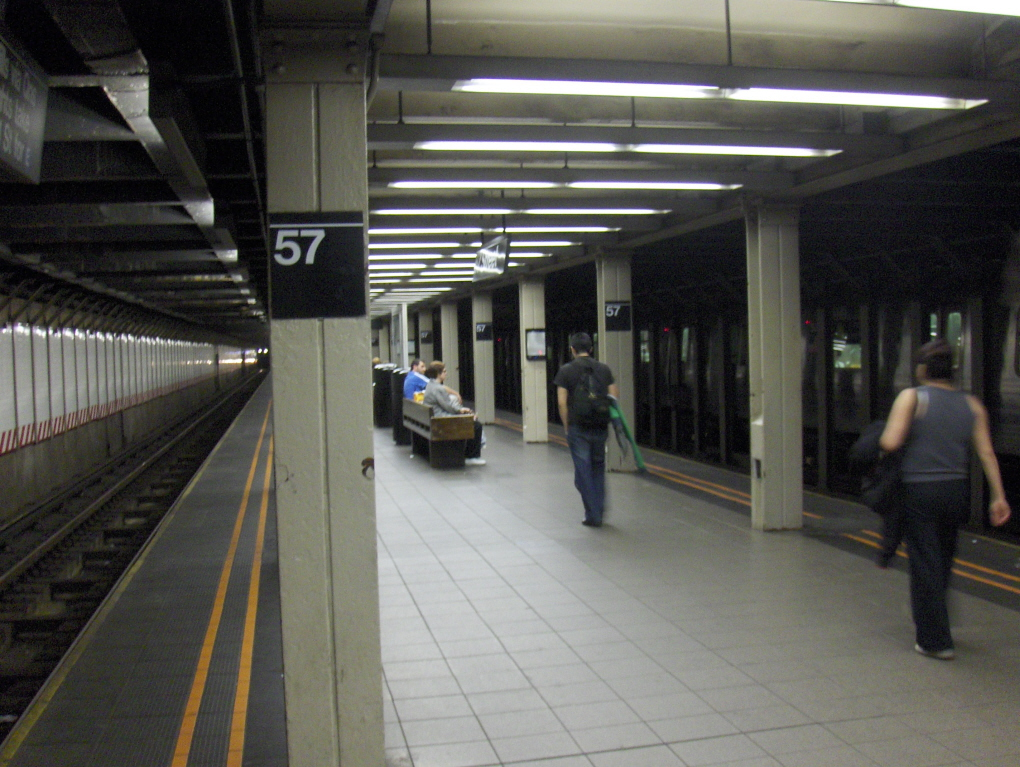
Uptown island platform

The 57th Street–7th Avenue station is the northernmost express station on the BMT Broadway Line. Much of the BMT system is chained from the zero point here. The N and Q both stop here at all times, the R stops here except at night, and the W stops here only on weekdays during the day. N, R and W trains use the local tracks, and Q trains as well as limited rush hour N trains use the express tracks. One weekday a.m. northbound R train crosses from the local track to the express track before stopping here. During the night, the Q makes local stops along the Broadway Line south of the station, crossing to the local track from the express track southbound and reverse northbound. The next stop to the north is Fifth Avenue–59th Street for N, R and W trains and Lexington Avenue–63rd Street for Q trains as well as those limited rush hour N trains and that one weekday a.m. R train. The next stop to the south is 49th Street for local trains and Times Square–42nd Street for express trains.

The artwork at the station, Carnegie Hall Montage by Josh Scharf, was commissioned in 1994 as part of the MTA Arts & Design program. The artwork consists of large color portraits of notable people who have performed at Carnegie Hall. The artwork extends onto the station's white, square porcelain wall tiles, which are similar to those in the rest of the system. Some of the tiles bear the names of notable people who have appeared or performed at the venue, as well as the date when they appeared.

=== Track layout ===
North of the station, the line splits into two routes, with connections from the express track to the local track northbound and from the local track to the express track southbound. Afterward, the local tracks ramp down and curve east under Central Park South, 60th Street and then Queens, while the express tracks continue north under Central Park before they curve east under 63rd Street and then north under Second Avenue. South of the station are diamond crossovers between all four tracks.

The BMT Broadway Line originally ended north of this station as six trackways. Both the innermost and outermost pairs of trackways curved slightly west before ending, which were a provision for the line to run to Upper Manhattan via Central Park West. Only the two center tracks on either side continued to the 60th Street Tunnel to Queens. Both of the outermost trackways are ramps which have never been used, but the innermost tracks eventually connected the express tracks with the BMT 63rd Street Line, which was completed in 1989. Prior to then, the express tracks continued as layup spurs north of the station, running for about 400 feet (120 m). Construction of the 63rd Street Line from 1971 to 1978 continued the section between this station and the Lexington Avenue–63rd Street station.

=== Exits ===
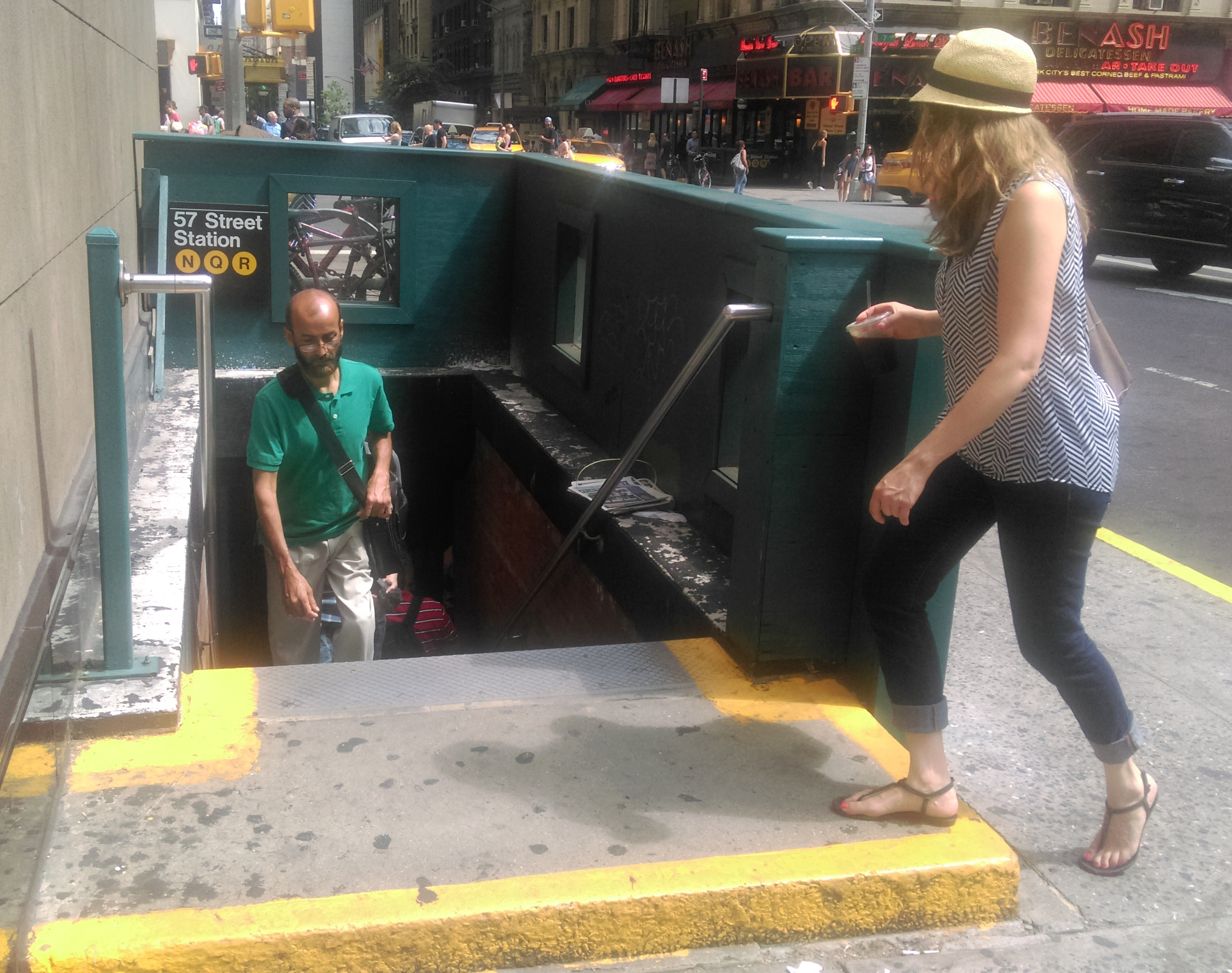
55th Street stairs

- Stair to NW corner of 7th Avenue and 57th Street (adjacent to the Osborne Apartments)
- Stair to NE corner of 7th Avenue and 57th Street (adjacent to The Briarcliffe)
- Stair and elevator to SW corner of 7th Avenue and 57th Street (adjacent to the Rodin Studios)
- Stair to SE corner of 7th Avenue and 57th Street (adjacent to Carnegie Hall)
- Stair to NW corner of 7th Avenue and 55th Street (adjacent to Park Central Hotel)
- Stair and elevator to NE corner of 7th Avenue and 55th Street (adjacent to Hotel Wellington)
- Stair to SW corner of 7th Avenue and 55th Street
- Stair to SE corner of 7th Avenue and 55th Street

== Proposed extension ==
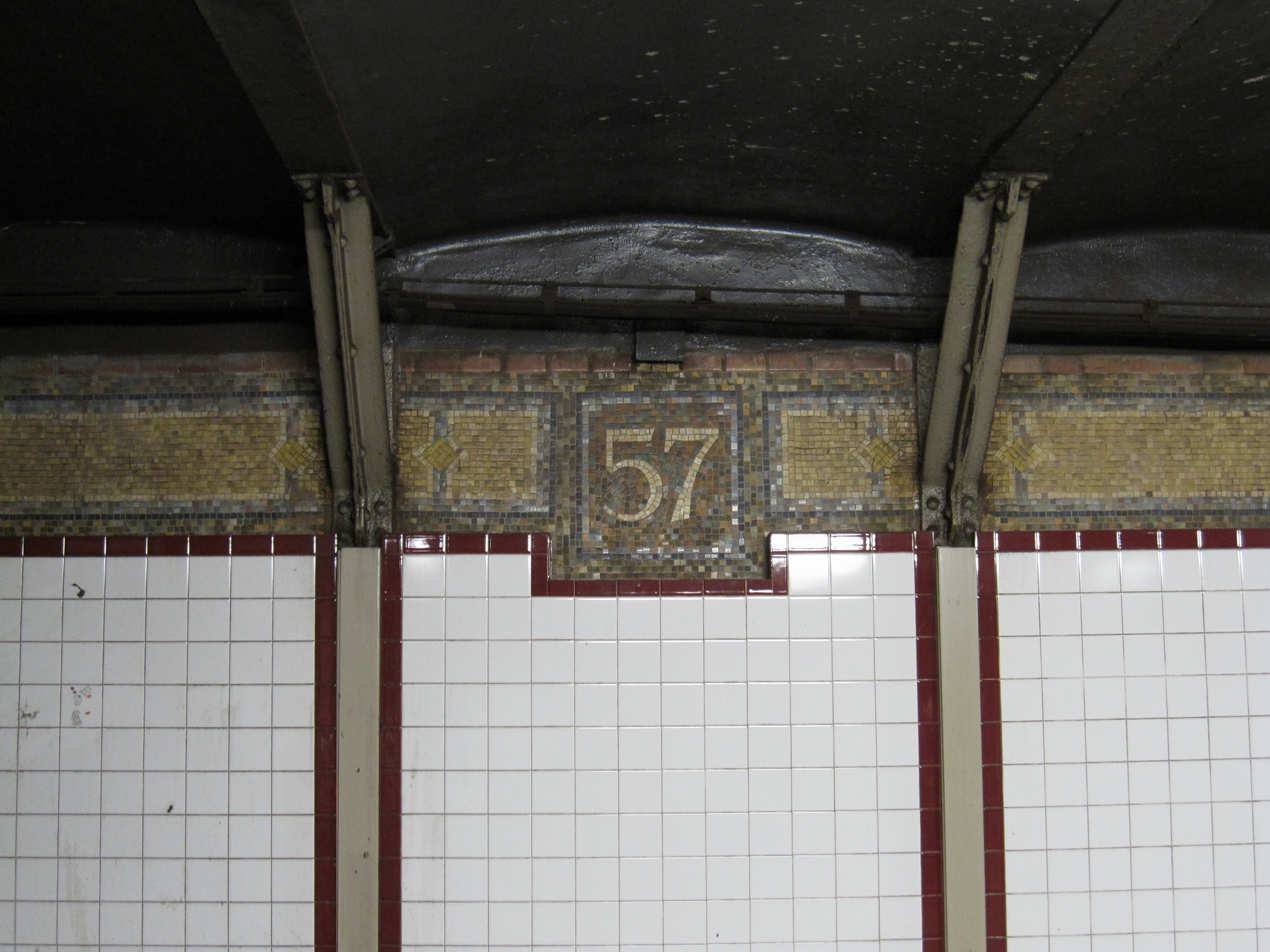
57 Mosaic

North of this station are tunnel stub headings running straight from the local tracks for a proposed line under Central Park West or Morningside Avenue, that would have terminated either at 145th Street or 155th Street.

When the BRT / BMT was building the Broadway line as part of the Dual Contracts, the company also wanted to be awarded the Central Park West / Eighth Avenue route, which was on the planning boards at that time. The company figured that if they built ramps from the Broadway line that could naturally be extended to an Eighth Avenue line, they would get a toehold on being awarded that line, rather than lose out to the IRT, the only other subway operator when the Dual Contracts were built. The BMT / BRT never built that line for various reasons including the bankruptcy of the company after the Malbone Street Wreck and Mayor Hylan's plan to include the Eighth Avenue / CPW route in the IND system. The ramps were built but never used for revenue service. They were eventually used for storage until the tracks were disconnected.

The disused trackways for the proposed line ramp up and run for about 500 feet (150 m). The ramp on the northbound side has a Maintenance-of-Way shed built on it, and the trackway on the southbound side also has a storage shed sitting in it, just north of where the local tracks come in, but this shed is few hundred feet north of the shed on the opposite trackway of the other side of the tunnel. Some of the actual rails remain and can be seen from passing express/63rd Street Line trains, but are covered by many years of dirt. The never-used trackways curve slightly west before ending.
