= 2022 New York City Subway attack =

Mass shooting in New York, U.S.

Coordinates: 40.642°N 74.017°W

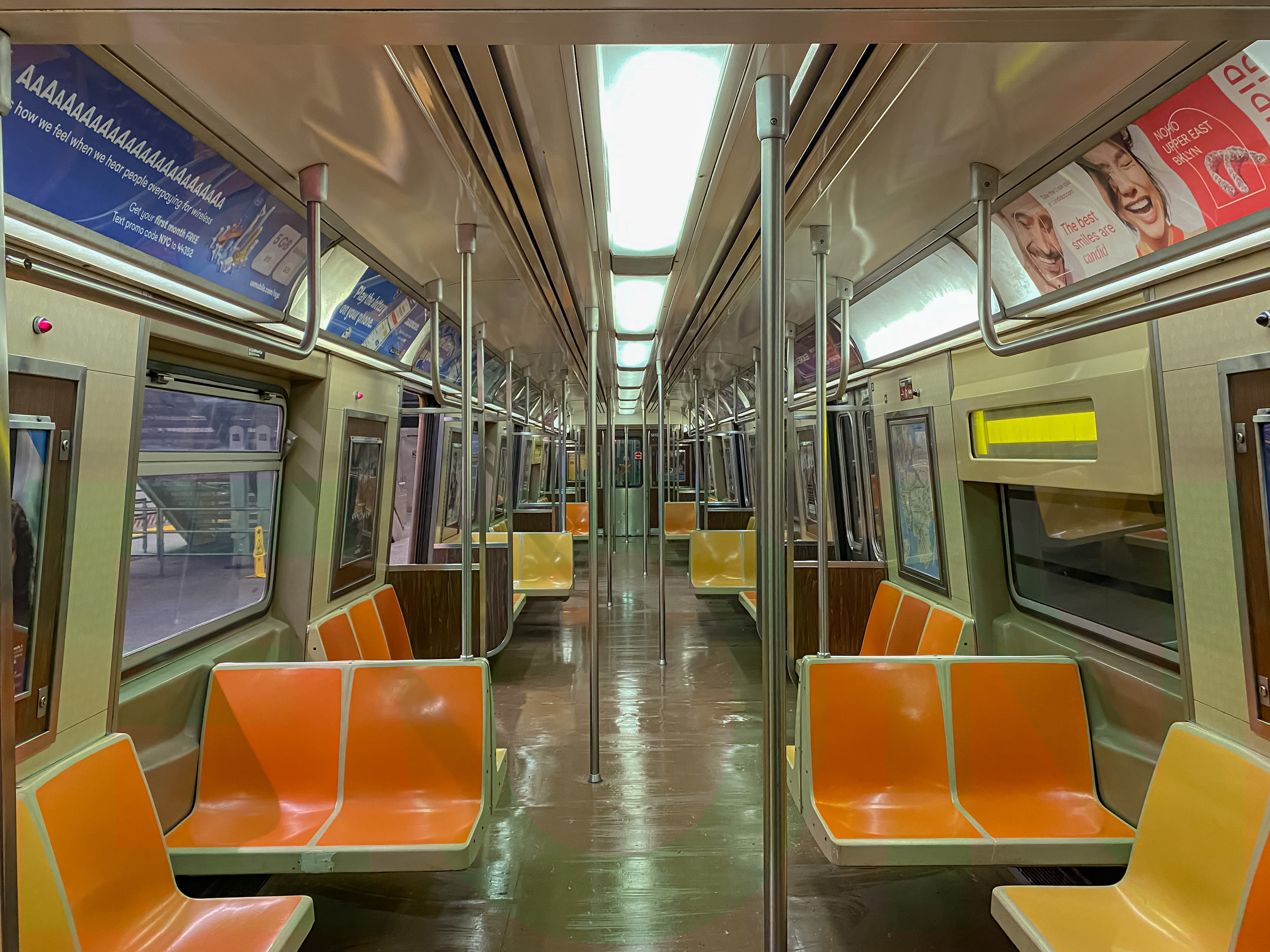
- Interior of an R46 subway car, similar to the one in which the attack took place.
- Location: N train pulling into the 36th Street station, New York City, United States
- Date: April 12, 2022; 4 years ago c. 8:24 a.m. (EDT)
- Target: Commuters on the N train
- Attack type: Mass shooting, attempted murder, domestic terrorism
- Weapons: Glock 17 9mm handgun; Smoke grenades
- Deaths: 0
- Injuries: 29 (10 by gunfire)
- Perpetrator: Frank Robert James
- Motive: Black supremacy
- Verdict: Guilty plea on charges of federal terrorism
- Convictions: Committing a terrorist attack on a mass transportation system (10 counts); Discharge of firearm during the commission of a crime of violence (1 count)
- Sentence: 10 concurrent life sentences without parole plus 10 years

On the morning of April 12, 2022, a black supremacist domestic terrorist attack was committed on a northbound N train on the New York City Subway in Sunset Park, Brooklyn. At approximately 8:24 a.m. EDT, 62-year-old Frank Robert James put on a gas mask, threw two smoke grenades, and fired a handgun 33 times. The shooting occurred as the train was traveling between the 59th Street and 36th Street stations.

Although no one died, 29 people were injured; ten victims were hit by direct gunfire, while the remaining injuries were from smoke inhalation. Most passengers disembarked at 36th Street, where some passengers fled onto an R train that traveled one additional stop to 25th Street. On the day after the attack, James was arrested as the suspect after a large manhunt. James was charged by the U.S. Attorney's Office for the Eastern District of New York with committing a terrorist act on a mass transit system and discharging a firearm during the commission of a crime of violence, to which James pleaded not guilty.

On January 3, 2023, James pleaded guilty to federal terrorism charges. On October 5, 2023, James was sentenced to 10 concurrent life sentences without the possibility of parole (one for each victim he shot), plus an additional 10 years for a firearms charge.

== Background ==
Reports of assaults and other major felonies occurring on the subway system increased significantly during the COVID-19 pandemic in New York City, when the number was adjusted for weekday ridership numbers. According to police statistics, crime in the subway increased 68% by April 2022 compared to the same time in 2021. Before the April 2022 shooting, there had been several high-profile incidents of violence in the subway, including the killing of Michelle Go in January and several stabbing cases.

== Attack ==
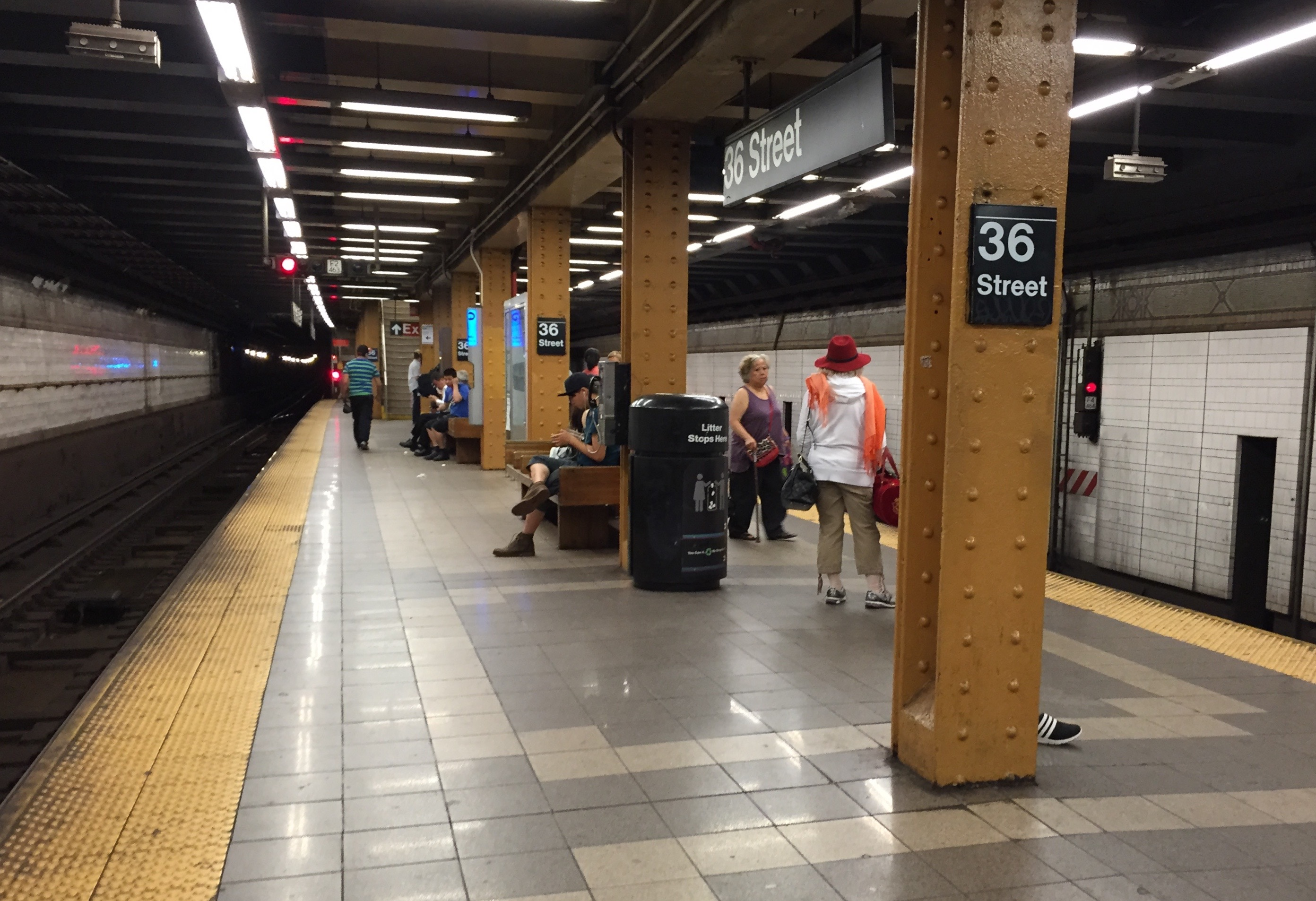
Some victims disembarked at the 36th Street station after the attack.

At 6:15 a.m. EDT on April 12, 2022, video surveillance captured footage of a man matching James' description, who left a U-Haul Chevrolet Express van two blocks from a train station on the same subway line where the attack took place.

At 8:24 a.m., multiple people were shot on a northbound N train on the New York City Subway in Sunset Park, Brooklyn. After the train left the 59th Street station on the Fourth Avenue Line, James put on a gas mask, threw two smoke grenades onto the floor of a train car, and opened fire with a Glock 17 9 mm handgun as the train approached the 36th Street station. He fired at least 33 shots and fled the scene after the attack.

When the train stopped at 36th Street, the wounded passengers disembarked at the platform, and police were called to the station at 8:30 a.m. A passenger waiting for the subway claimed that he saw "calamity" when the subway door opened due to the smoke, blood, and screaming. Footage of the evacuation from the subway train was filmed by a passenger in an adjacent car and quickly published on social media and news sites. The footage depicted the chaos of the evacuation with many people helping injured passengers, shouting about details of the shooting, and requesting emergency services.

An announcement by the conductor on the R train across the platform urged riders on the northbound platform to board that train. When the train arrived at the 25th Street station, it stayed put, and police officers instructed riders to leave the station. In response, many riders began running for the exits in a panic, injuring more people. Passengers from the train attended three injured people in one of the cars toward the front of the train.

The New York City Fire Department (FDNY) arrived at the 36th Street station, initially responding to reports of smoke in the station.

== Victims ==
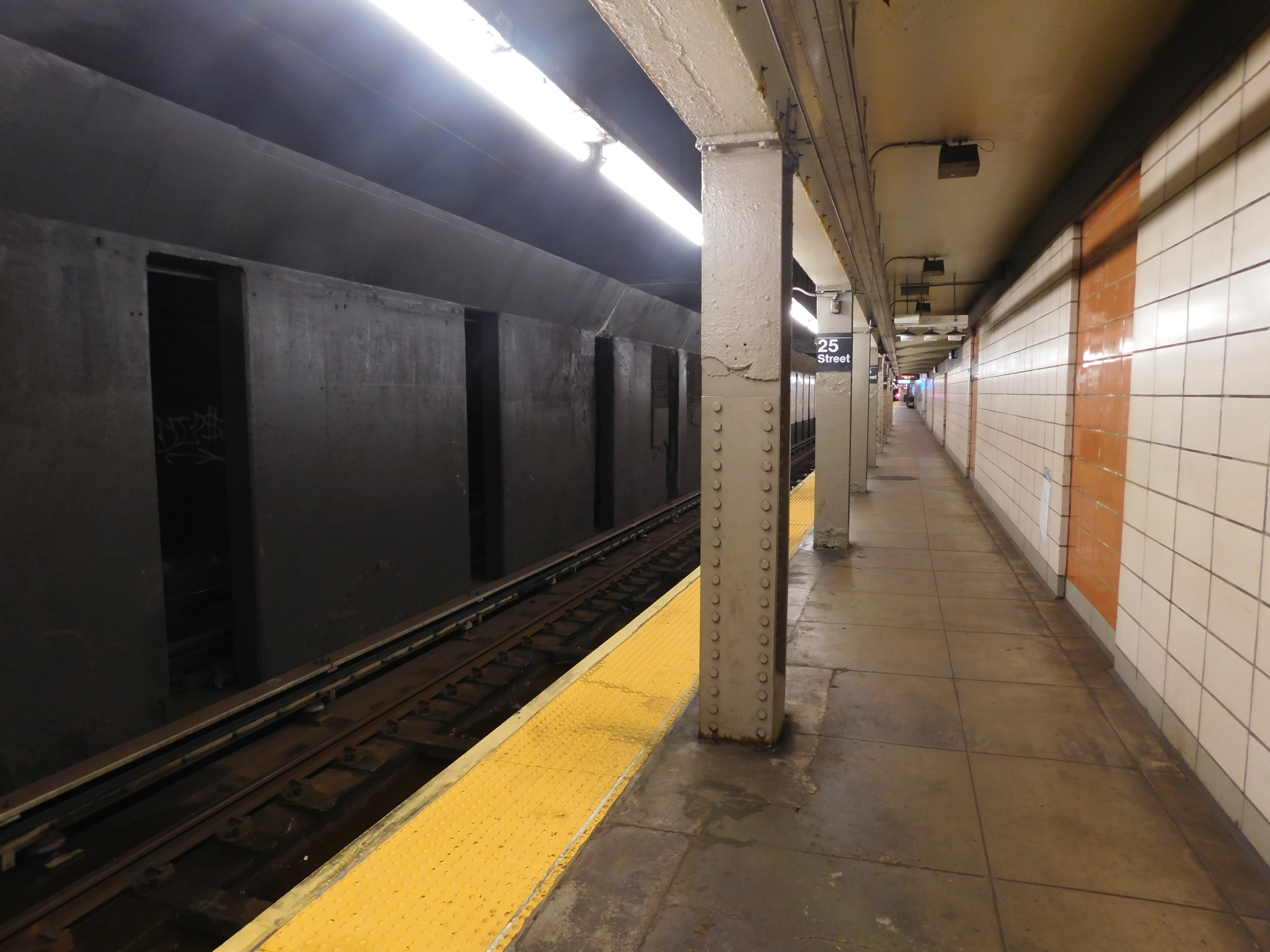
Some victims reached the 25th Street station.

At a morning press conference on the day of the attack, the FDNY said there were 16 people injured, 10 of them with gunshot wounds, 5 of whom were then in critical but stable condition. By the end of the day, a total of 29 injuries were reported: 10 with direct gunfire wounds, and 19 with other injuries.

Some of the injured jumped onto another train to flee the area and received aid at the next station, 25th Street. The people not injured by gunfire were instead injured from smoke inhalation or other conditions as they fled the scene.

== Investigation ==
Keechant Sewell, the New York City Police Commissioner, said on the day of the attack that the incident was not being investigated as a terrorist attack at that time. She did not rule out the possibility, saying the attack was under investigation. FBI, ATF, and HSI investigators were on the scene along with the NYPD. Investigation efforts were hampered by the lack of working security cameras in three subway stations. Police obtained a picture of the suspect from a bystander's cell phone video. A $50,000 reward was offered for information leading to the suspect's arrest.

Recovered from the train at the scene were several items, including a Glock 9-millimeter handgun, three ammunition magazines, a credit card in the name of Frank R. James, and a key to a U-Haul van. Also recovered from the scene were two non-detonated smoke grenades, gasoline, a variety of fireworks (including canister smoke), and a hatchet.

During the afternoon of April 13, the day after the attack, a surveillance video showed James entering the subway at the Kings Highway station on the Sea Beach Line, served by the N train.

== Perpetrator ==
=== Background ===
Frank Robert James was born in the Bronx on August 8, 1959, and spent years drifting across many cities in the United States. James had been arrested on 12 previous occasions, mostly for misdemeanors. He was arrested nine times in New York from 1992 to 1998, with charges including possession of burglary tools, criminal sex acts, and criminal tampering. He was arrested three times in the Newark area of New Jersey, the earliest in 1991 and the most recent in 2007; in 1992, he was charged with making terroristic threats, but was convicted of the lesser charge of harassment and sentenced to probation and counseling. He had no felony convictions and was legally allowed to purchase guns; he purchased his Glock 9mm handgun in 2011 from a pawn shop in Columbus, Ohio.

In a video he published in the weeks before the subway shooting, James claimed to have a severe post-traumatic stress disorder.

=== Extremist views ===
In rambling videos posted over a series of years on YouTube and Facebook accounts, James often posted angry and hate-filled rants, including those containing homophobia, misogyny and racist comments. He posted antisemitic diatribes, expressed grievances at persons he believed had wronged him, made violent threats, and invoked mass shootings.

James' beliefs have been linked to Black supremacy and he has been outspoken in his criticisms of mayor Eric Adams and New York City's mental health services in several YouTube videos. James posted, "O black Jesus, please kill all the whiteys" on social media. He implied that a "race war" was imminent, and said that "White people and Black people should not have any contact with each other." James compared the systemic racism that he believed African Americans faced to the Auschwitz concentration camp, saying that he believes "the seed [was] already planted for a Nazi Party to rise in [the United States] again."

=== Investigation and manhunt ===
The suspect—who was described as a heavy-built black male, 5 feet 5 inches (1.65 m) tall and 175 to 180 pounds (79 to 82 kg), wearing a gas mask, MTA uniform, a gray hooded sweatshirt, a green vest and a backpack—fled the scene through another subway train and was not immediately apprehended. According to charging documents in federal court, surveillance footage showed James exiting the subway system at the 25th Street station, one stop away from the shooting. Upon reports that the suspect may have fled onto the subway tracks, NYPD officers searched the tunnels. Law enforcement officials believed at the time that the attacker acted alone.

A U-Haul Chevrolet Express van used by the suspected gunman and rented in Philadelphia was found eight hours after the attack, about five blocks away from the Kings Highway station of the Sea Beach Line (served by the N train), where police reported the suspect entered the subway system. Investigators were able to identify the suspect after finding a key at the crime scene, linking it to the credit card that was used to rent the van. A jacket discarded by James on the 36th Street station platform had a receipt from a storage facility in Philadelphia in it, where he rented an apartment in the weeks before the attack. Searches of the storage facility and apartment found handgun ammunition, a taser, a high-capacity magazine for rifles, and a smoke canister.

At around 7:20 p.m. on the day of the attack, James, then age 62, was named by the NYPD as a person of interest. James was believed to be the renter of the U-Haul van. On the day after the attack, he was named as a suspect. Authorities sent out an emergency alert with photos of James and a tipline; the rare use of the alert system (which was also used during the manhunt for the 2016 Chelsea bomber) distributed James' name and face to every New Yorker with a smartphone. During the manhunt, authorities appealed to the public to provide mobile phone videos from the shooting or any other information that could locate the suspect.

=== Arrest and charges ===
The day after the attack, James called the tipline, said he knew he was wanted and that he was at a McDonald's at Sixth Street and First Avenue in the East Village neighborhood of Lower Manhattan. Officers responding to the McDonald's did not find James. However, after artist and gallery owner Lee Vasu saw James on the street and called the police, they found James near St. Marks Place and First Avenue and arrested him at about 1:45 p.m. ET. The manhunt lasted 29 hours. Dozens of people contacted NYPD with tips about James' whereabouts, and many took credit for his apprehension.

James was charged by the U.S. Attorney's Office for the Eastern District of New York with committing a terrorist act on a mass transit system, potentially facing a maximum of life in prison.

On January 3, 2023, James pled guilty to federal terrorism charges. On October 5, 2023, James was sentenced in federal court to 10 concurrent life sentences without parole (one for each victim he shot), plus an additional 10 years for a firearms charge. As of January 2025, James was incarcerated at ADX Florence near Florence, Colorado.

== Aftermath ==
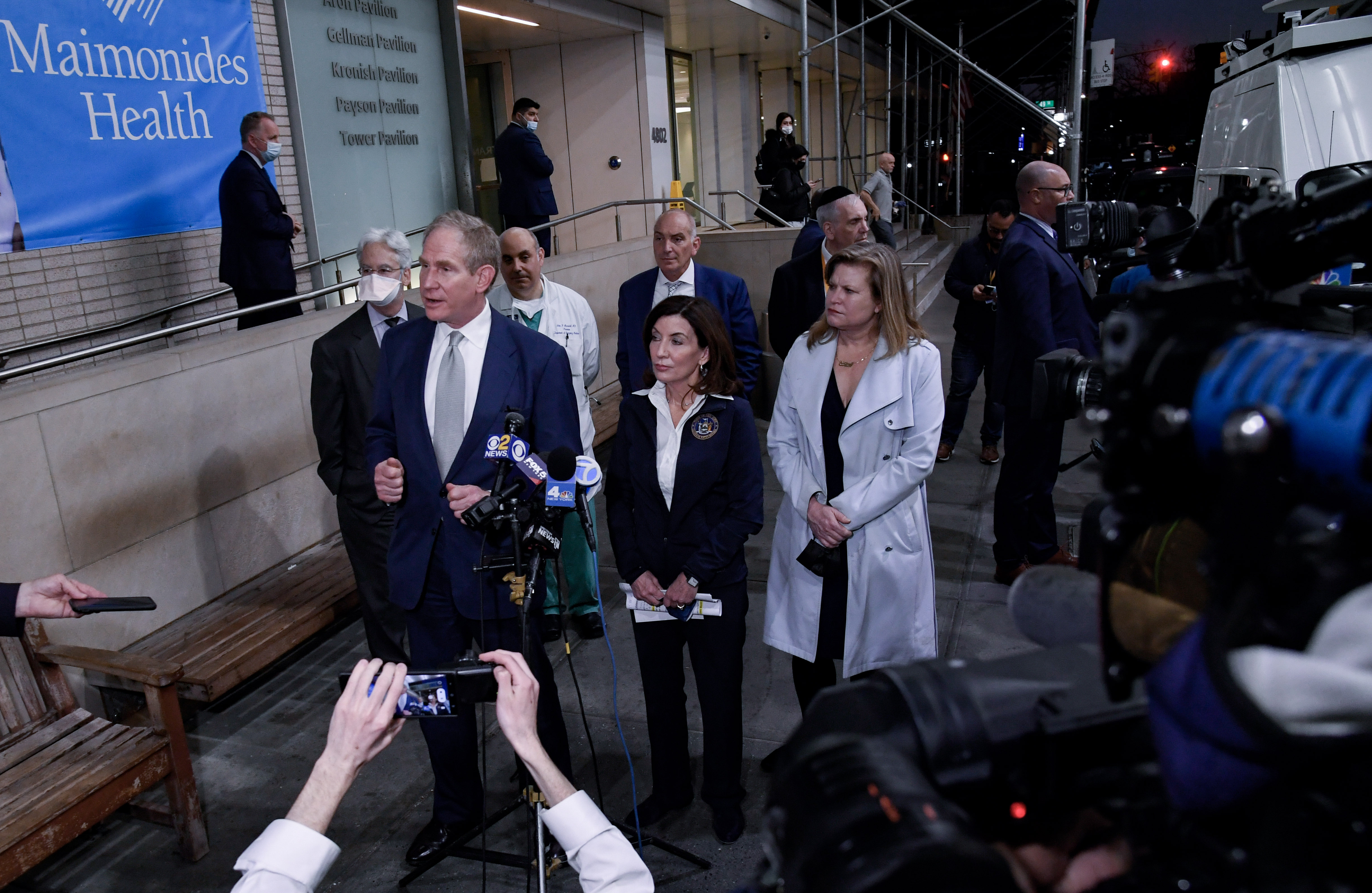
MTA CEO Janno Lieber and Governor Kathy Hochul after visiting victims at Maimonides Medical Center

As a precaution, law enforcement increased security at regional transit hubs. The security detail of Mayor Eric Adams was augmented, as the suspect had made "concerning posts" about the mayor.

Service on the D, N, and R trains was partially suspended along the BMT Fourth Avenue Line following the attack, B and W trains were suspended while Q trains ran local in Manhattan to provide additional service. Service was later restored along the BMT Fourth Avenue Line, initially bypassing the 36th Street station. NYC Ferry offered free transit on its South Brooklyn route on the day of the shooting. Following surge pricing by both Uber and Lyft after the shooting, and many customers posting screenshots of the prices to social media, Uber announced surge pricing would be disabled in the vicinity of the shooting and pricing would be capped for the entire city, with refunds offered to affected users.

Five people split the $50,000 reward that had been offered for information leading to the suspect's arrest. On April 21, Adams honored civilians and police officers who were involved in the capture of James. Four of the five civilians who split the $50,000 reward attended the ceremony.

A week after the attack, several members of Congress from New York sent a letter to the MTA, asking why the surveillance cameras at the 36th Street station had malfunctioned prior to the attack. In a letter dated May 2, 2022, MTA chairman Janno Lieber said the cameras at the 25th, 36th, and 45th Street stations had faulty fan units, which impacted the cameras' ability to transmit footage. The day before the attack, maintenance teams had unsuccessfully attempted to repair the cameras. The teams had been installing new communications hardware on the morning of April 12 when they were forced to evacuate; according to Lieber, the repairs were completed in the middle of the day on April 13.

== Reactions ==
President Joe Biden and U.S. Attorney General Merrick Garland were briefed on the shooting. A spokesman for Mayor Eric Adams called on New Yorkers to "stay away from this area for their safety and so that first responders can help those in need and investigate". New York Governor Kathy Hochul called the suspect "cold hearted and depraved" while calling for an end to mass shootings and violence in New York City. The week after the shooting, local politicians organized a "Day of Unity" to help victims of the attack and local residents.

== See also ==
- 1984 New York City Subway shooting
- 1993 Long Island Rail Road shooting
