= 25th Street station (BMT Fourth Avenue Line) =

New York City Subway station in Brooklyn

25 Street
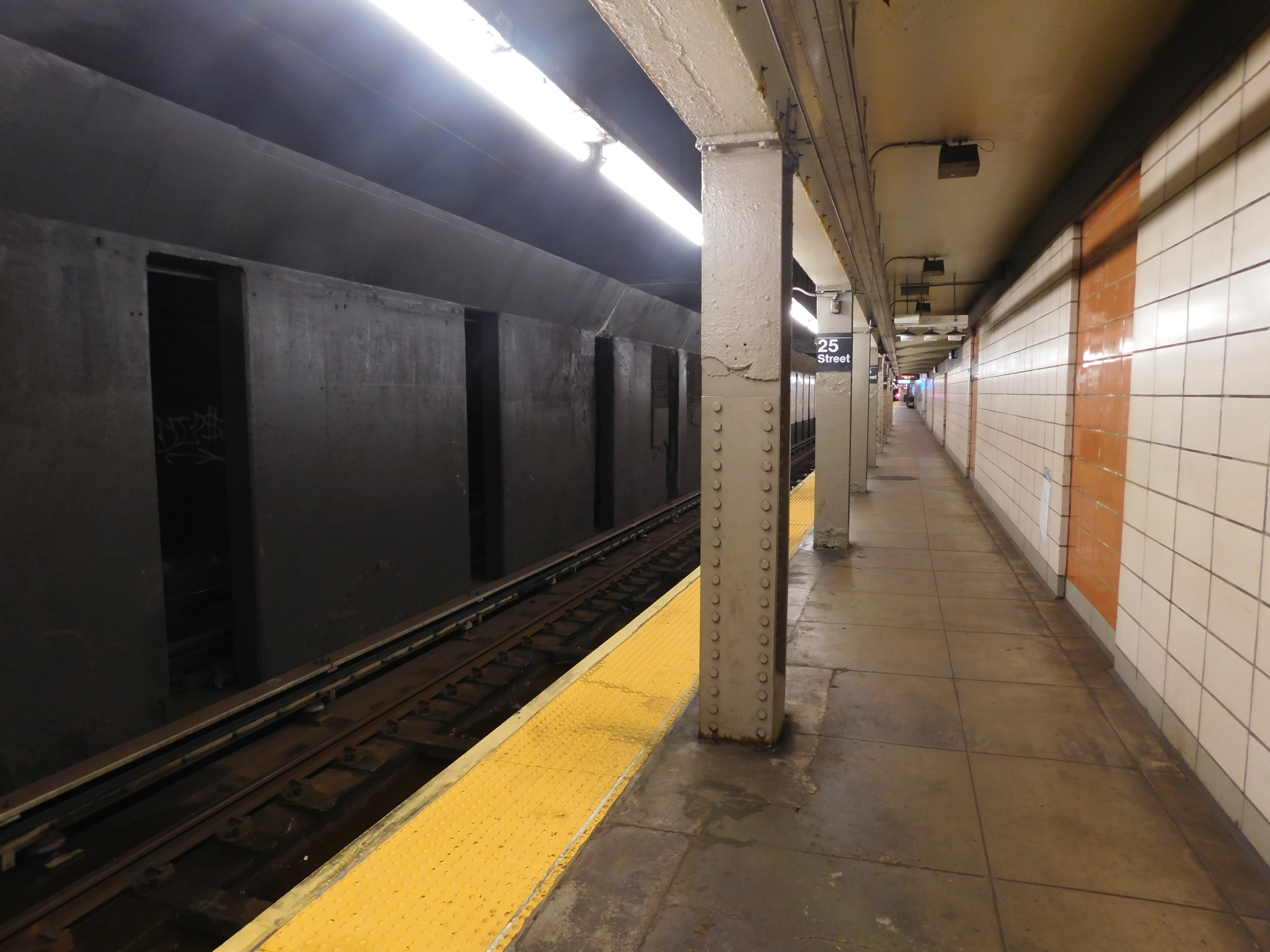
- Southbound platform

Station statistics
- Address: 25th Street & Fourth Avenue; Brooklyn, New York
- Borough: Brooklyn
- Locale: Greenwood Heights
- Coordinates: 40°39′38″N 73°59′53″W
- Division: B (BMT)
- Line: BMT Fourth Avenue Line
- Services: D (late nights); N (late nights, and limited rush hour service in the reverse-peak direction); R (all times); W (limited rush hour service only)
- Structure: Underground
- Platforms: 2 side platforms
- Tracks: 4

Other information
- Opened: June 22, 1915 (111 years ago)

Traffic
- 2025: 902,467 ▲7.6%
- Rank: 330 out of 423
Services
Preceding station	New York City Subway	Following station
Prospect Avenue D N R W toward Forest Hills–71st Avenue	Local	36th Street D N R W toward Bay Ridge–95th Street
Location
Location within New York City Subway
Location within New York City
Location within New York
Track layout
Street map
Station service legend
Symbol	Description
Stops all times except late nights	Stops all times except late nights
Stops late nights only	Stops late nights only
Stops rush hours only	Stops rush hours only
Stops rush hours in the peak direction only	Stops rush hours in the peak direction only

The 25th Street station is a local station on the BMT Fourth Avenue Line of the New York City Subway. Located at the intersection of 25th Street and Fourth Avenue in Greenwood Heights, Brooklyn, it is served by the R train at all times. The D and N trains also stop here during late nights, and some rush-hour W trains stop here in the peak direction.

The 25th Street station was constructed as part of the Fourth Avenue Line, which was approved in 1905. Construction on the segment of the line that includes 25th Street started on December 20, 1909, and was completed in May 1912. The station opened on June 22, 1915, as part of the initial portion of the BMT Fourth Avenue Line to 59th Street. The station's platforms were lengthened in 1926–1927, and again during a renovation in 1968–1970.

== History ==
=== Construction ===
The 25th Street station was constructed as part of the Fourth Avenue Line, the plan for which was initially adopted on June 1, 1905. The Rapid Transit Commission was succeeded on July 1, 1907, by the New York State Public Service Commission (PSC), which approved the plan for the line in late 1907. The contract for the section of the line that included the 25th Street station, Route 11A3, which extended from 10th Street to 27th Street, was awarded on May 22, 1908, to the Tidewater Building Company and Thomas B. Bryson for $2,043,162.31 (equivalent to $73,213,000 in 2025). The New York City Board of Estimate approved the contract on October 29, 1909. Construction on the segment started on December 20, 1909, and was completed in May 1912.

As part of negotiations between New York City, the Brooklyn Rapid Transit Company (BRT), and the Interborough Rapid Transit Company for the expansion of the city's transit network, the line was leased to a subsidiary of the BRT. The agreement, known as Contract 4 of the Dual Contracts, was signed on March 19, 1913. 25th Street opened on June 22, 1915, as part of an extension of the subway to Coney Island, which included the Fourth Avenue Line north of 59th Street as well as the entire Sea Beach Line. The station's opening was marked with a competition between two trains heading from Chambers Street station in Manhattan to the Coney Island station, one heading via the West End Line and the other via the Sea Beach Line; the latter got to Coney Island first.

=== Station renovations ===
==== 1920s ====
On June 27, 1922, the New York State Transit Commission commissioned its engineers to examine platform-lengthening plans for 23 stations on the lines of the Brooklyn–Manhattan Transit Corporation (BMT), the successor to the BRT, to accommodate eight-car trains. As part of the project, 25th Street's platforms would have been lengthened from 435 feet (133 m) to 530 feet (160 m). Though the Transit Commission ordered the BMT to lengthen these platforms in September 1923, no further progress was made until February 16, 1925, when the New York City Board of Transportation (NYCBOT) commissioned its engineers to examine platform-lengthening plans for this and eleven other stations along the Fourth Avenue Line. It estimated the project would cost $633,000 (equivalent to $11,621,000 in 2025). The NYCBOT received bids for the project on February 25, 1926. The contract was awarded to the Corson Construction Company for $345,021 (equivalent to $6,275,000 in 2025). The extensions opened on August 1, 1927.

==== 1950s and 1960s ====
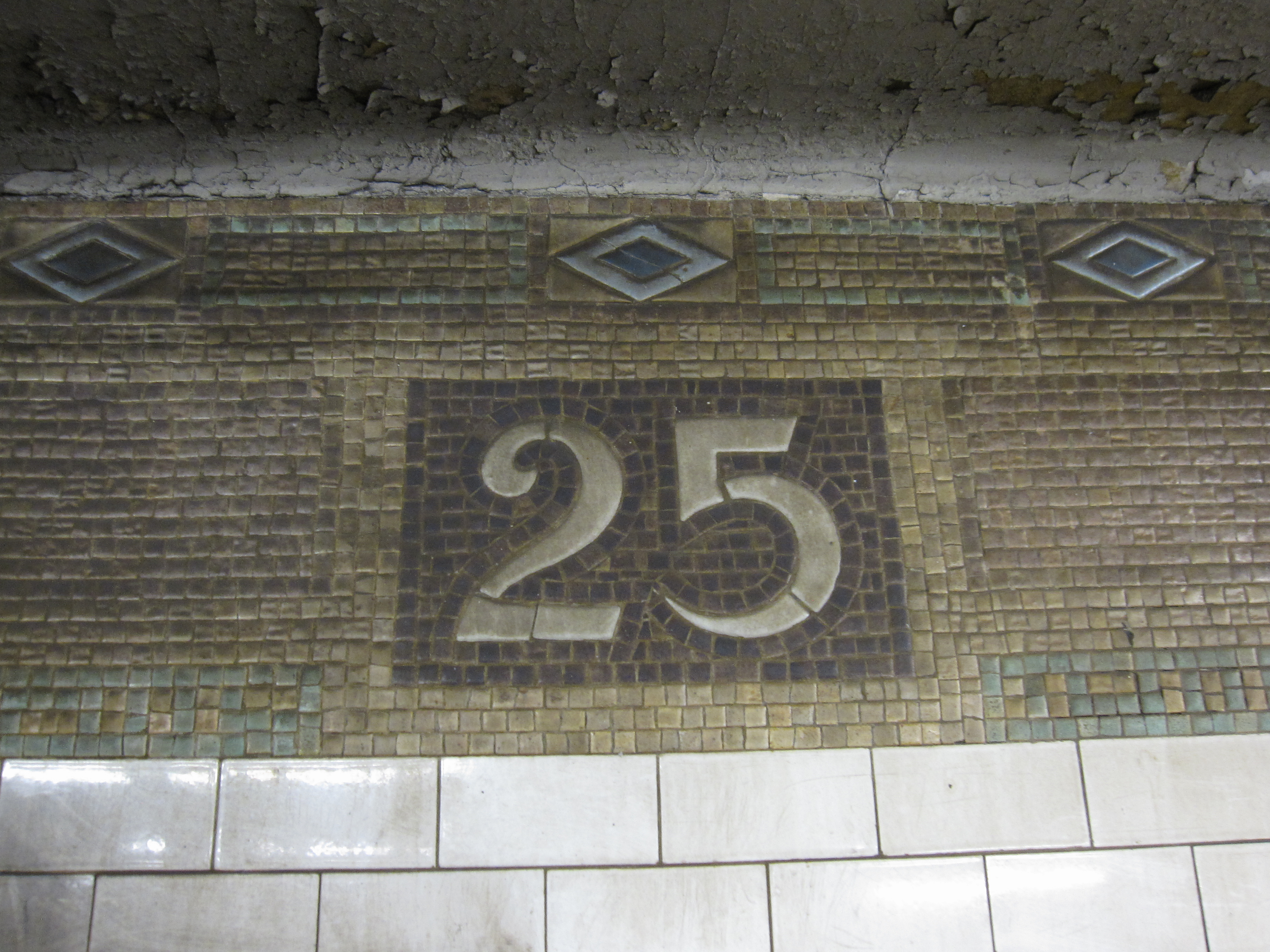
Original mosaic tiles

The city government took over the BMT's operations on June 1, 1940. In July 1959, the New York City Transit Authority (NYCTA) announced that it would install fluorescent lighting at the 25th Street station and five other stations along the Fourth Avenue Line for between $175,000 and $200,000. Bids on the project were to be advertised on August 7, 1959, and completed by Fall 1960.

In the 1960s, the NYCTA started a project to lengthen station platforms on its lines in Southern Brooklyn to 615 feet (187 m) to accommodate 10-car trains. On July 14, 1967, the NYCTA awarded a contract to conduct test borings at eleven stations on the Fourth Avenue Line, including 25th Street, to the W. M. Walsh Corporation for $6,585 (equivalent to $63,583 in 2025) in preparation of the construction of platform extensions. The NYCTA issued an invitation for bids on the project to extend the platforms at stations along the Fourth Avenue Line between Pacific Street and 36th Street, including those at 25th Street, on March 28, 1969. Funding for the renovation projects came out of the NYCTA's 1969–1970 Capital Budget, costing $8,177,890 (equivalent to $71,798,000 in 2025) in total.

As part of the renovation project, the station's platforms were extended, and the station's elaborate mosaic tile walls were covered over with 8-by-16-inch (20 by 41 cm) white cinderblock tiles. The latter change, which was also made to 15 other stations on the BMT Broadway and Fourth Avenue Lines, was criticized for being dehumanizing. The NYCTA spokesman stated that the old tiles were in poor condition and that the change was made to improve the appearance of stations and provide uniformity. Furthermore, it did not consider the old mosaics to have "any great artistic merit".

== Station layout ==
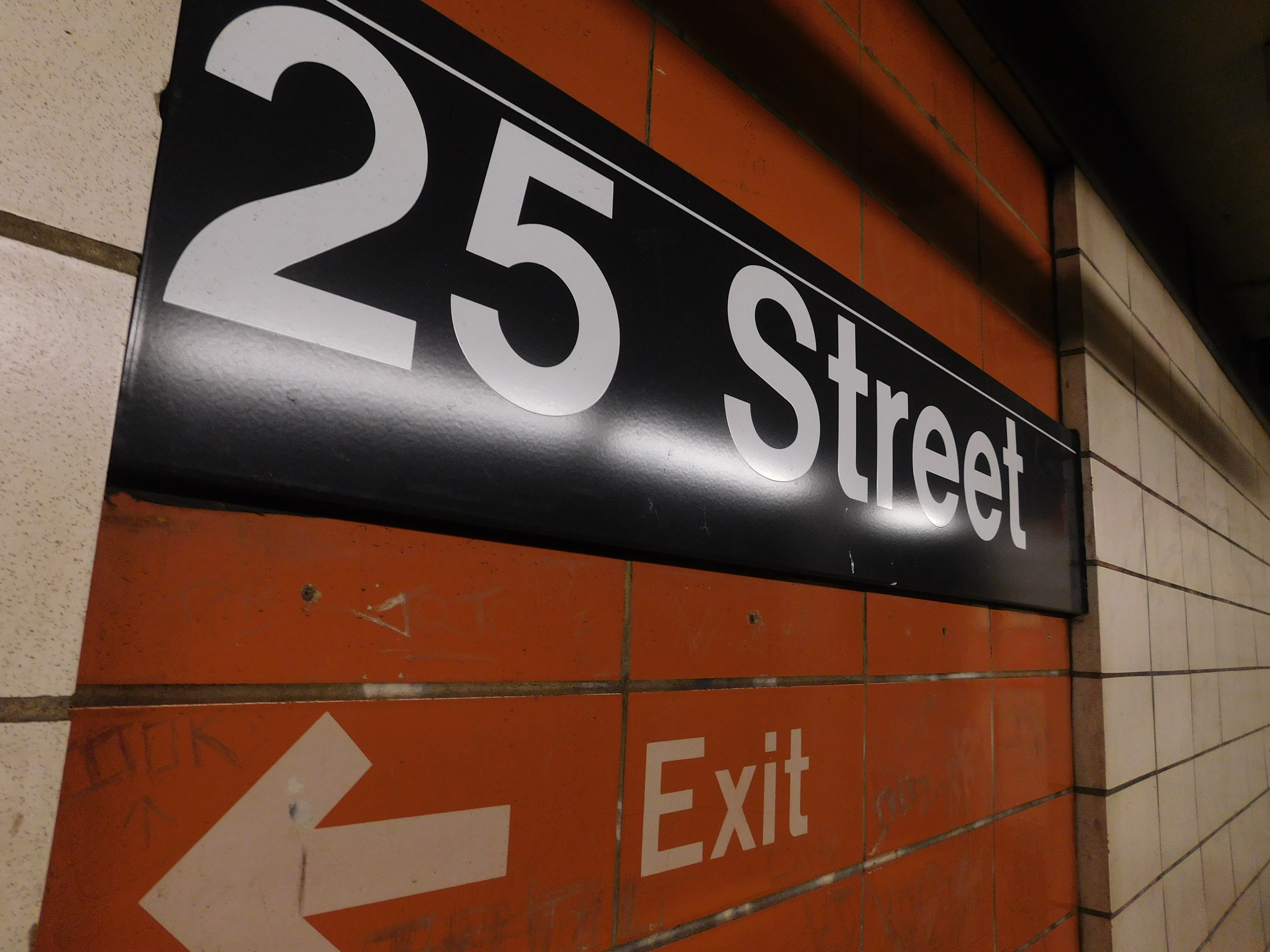
Station name sign

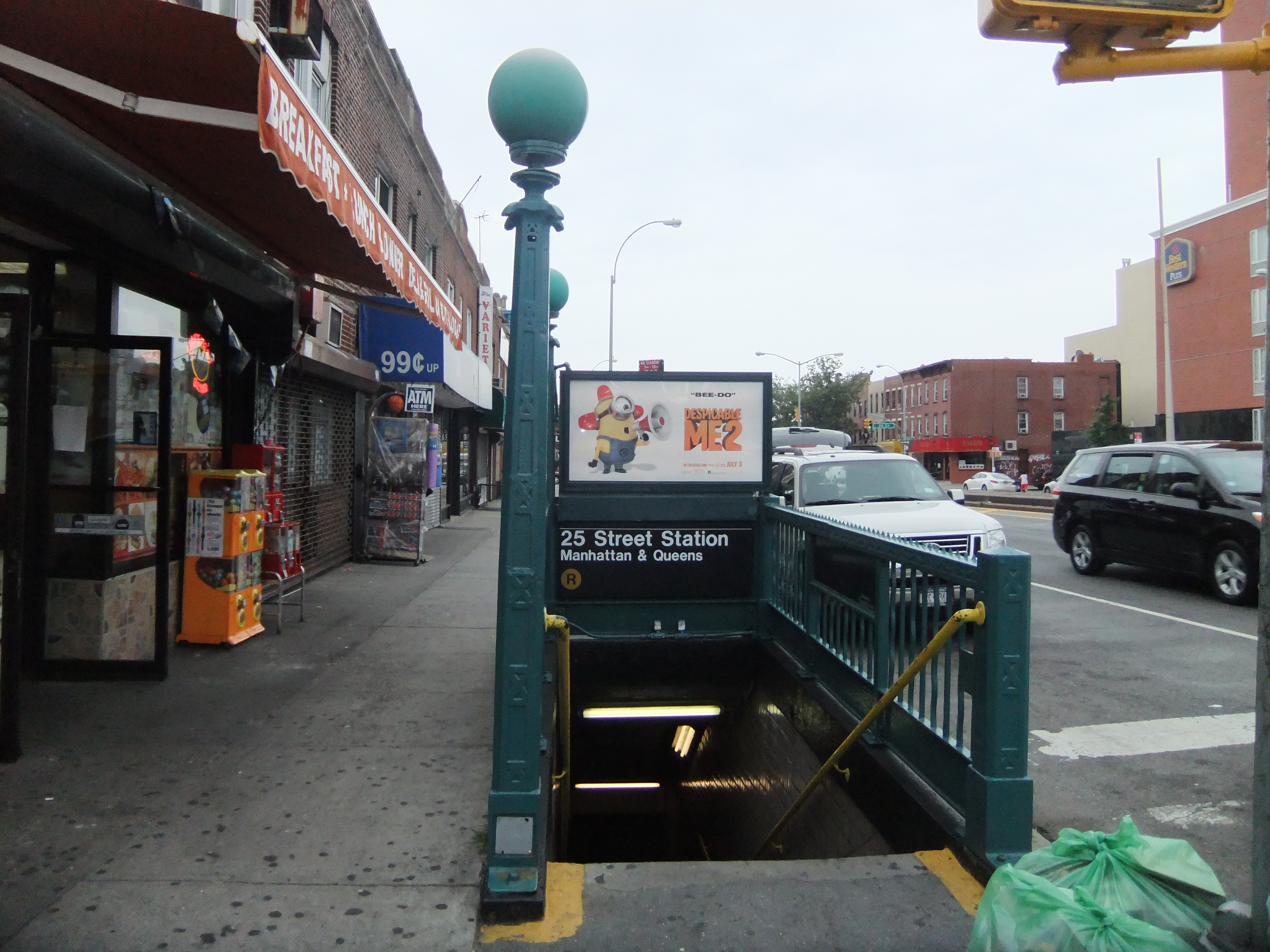
The single street stair to the Manhattan-bound platform

This underground station has four tracks and two side platforms. The R stops here at all times; some rush-hour W trains stop here in the peak direction; and the D and N stop here during late nights, but use the center express tracks to bypass the station during daytime hours. The station is between Prospect Avenue to the north and 36th Street to the south. White tiled curtain walls separate the express tracks from the local tracks, with several openings that allow a view of the express tracks from the platforms. The walls were intended to improve ventilation, as passing trains would push air forward, rather than to the sides of the tunnel.

The platforms have no columns except for a section at the extreme north ends where they were extended in 1970. The ceiling in this area is lower. These columns are I-beams and are painted cream-colored.

Prior to the station's 1970 renovation, it was finished all in white and marble tile, and it had its own color scheme to allow regular passengers to identify the station based only on the color of the marble trimmings. However, the original trim line is still visible in the fare control areas behind the token booth and MetroCard Vending Machines. It is in the standard BMT format with "25" number tablets in it at regular intervals. Since the renovation, the station walls have consisted of white cinderblock tiles, except for small recesses in the walls, which contain orange-painted cinderblock tiles. The orange cinderblock field contains the station-name signs and white text pointing to the exits.

=== Exits ===
Each platform has a same-level fare control area in the center. As a result, there is no free transfer between directions. Each fare control area has a turnstile bank, token booth, and single street stair. The staircase on the Bay Ridge-bound platform goes up to the southwestern corner of 25th Street and Fourth Avenue, while the one on the Manhattan-bound side goes up to the southeastern corner of the same intersection.

== Nearby points of interest ==
The 25th Street station is the closest station to the main entrance of Green-Wood Cemetery, located one block to the east of the station. The entrance dates back to 1862, and is a New York City designated landmark, made of New Jersey brownstone with sculpted groups.
