= 36th Street station (BMT Fourth Avenue Line) =

New York City Subway station in Brooklyn

36 Street
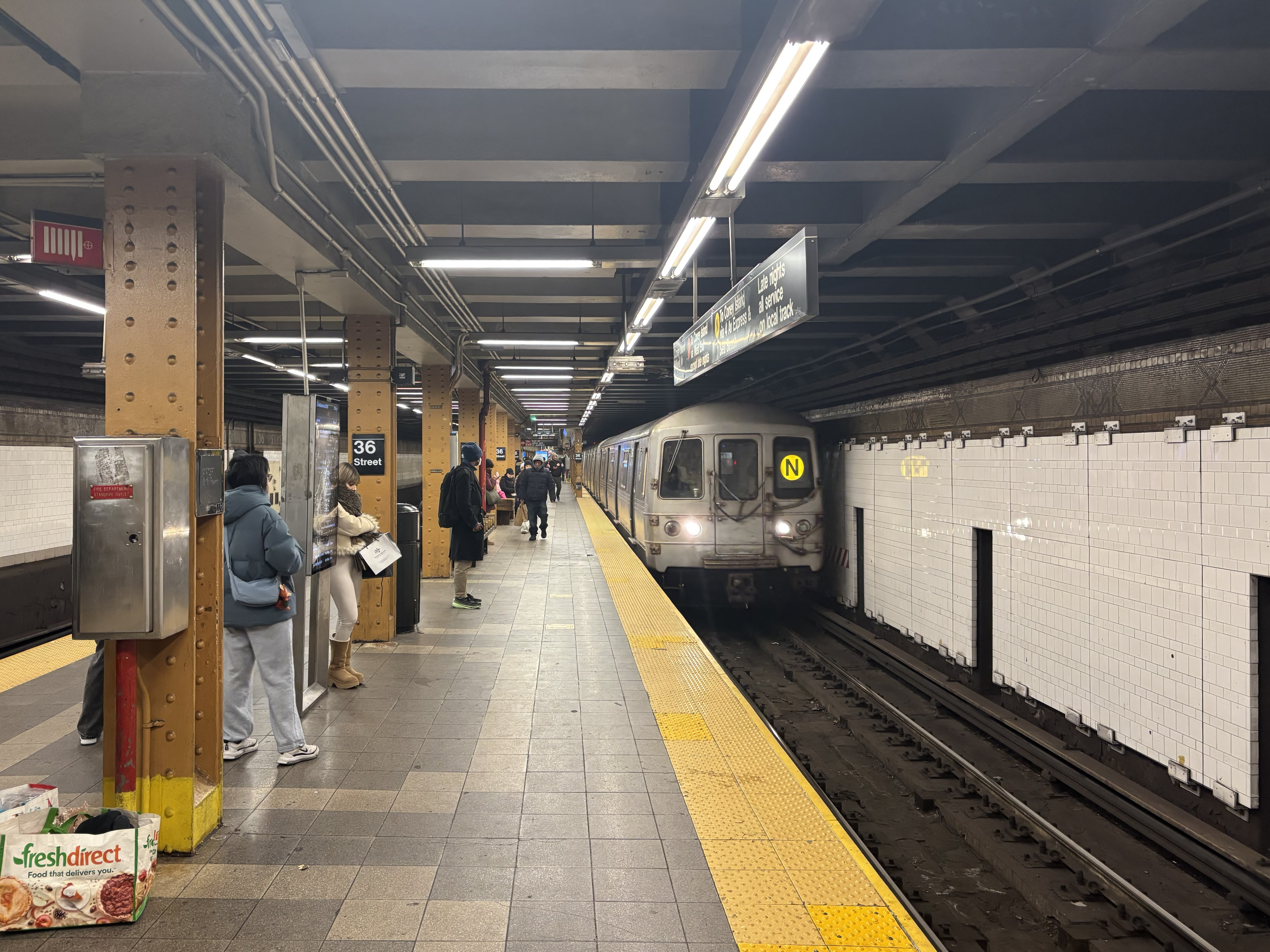
- R46 N train arriving at the southbound platform

Station statistics
- Address: 36th Street & Fourth Avenue; Brooklyn, New York
- Borough: Brooklyn
- Locale: Sunset Park
- Coordinates: 40°39′15″N 74°00′16″W
- Division: B (BMT)
- Line: BMT Fourth Avenue Line
- Services: D (all times); N (all times); R (all times); W (limited rush hour service only)
- Transit: NYCT Bus: B35, B70
- Structure: Underground
- Platforms: 2 island platforms cross-platform interchange
- Tracks: 4

Other information
- Opened: June 22, 1915 (111 years ago)
- Accessible: No; under construction
- Accessibility: Cross-platform transfer available

Traffic
- 2025: 3,894,072 ▲8.9%
- Rank: 89 out of 423
Services
Preceding station	New York City Subway	Following station
Atlantic Avenue–Barclays Center D N northbound	D (New York City Subway service)	Ninth Avenue D R W toward Coney Island–Stillwell Avenue
Atlantic Avenue–Barclays Center D N northbound	Express	59th Street N toward Coney Island–Stillwell Avenue
25th Street D N R W toward Forest Hills–71st Avenue	Local	45th Street N R W toward Bay Ridge–95th Street
Location
Location within New York City Subway
Location within New York City
Location within New York
Track layout
Street map
Station service legend
Symbol	Description
Stops all times except late nights	Stops all times except late nights
Stops all times	Stops all times
Stops late nights only	Stops late nights only
Stops rush hours only	Stops rush hours only
Stops rush hours in the peak direction only	Stops rush hours in the peak direction only

The 36th Street station is an express station on the BMT Fourth Avenue Line of the New York City Subway, located at 36th Street and Fourth Avenue in Sunset Park, Brooklyn. It is served by the D, N, and R trains at all times. During rush hours, a limited number of W trains also serve this station.

The 36th Street station was constructed as part of the Fourth Avenue Line, which was approved in 1905. Construction on the segment of the line that includes 36th Street started on December 10, 1909, and was completed in October 1912. The station opened on June 22, 1915, as part of the initial portion of the BMT Fourth Avenue Line to 59th Street. The station's entrances were relocated in 1929, and the platforms were lengthened during a renovation in 1968–1970. The station was renovated again in 1996–1997, and it is planned to receive elevators as part of the Metropolitan Transportation Authority's 2020–2024 Capital Program.

== History ==
=== Construction ===
The 36th Street station was constructed as part of the Fourth Avenue Line, the plan for which was initially adopted on June 1, 1905. The Rapid Transit Commission was succeeded on July 1, 1907, by the New York State Public Service Commission (PSC), which approved the plan for the line in late 1907. The contract for the section of the line that included the 36th Street station, Route 11A4, which extended from 27th Street to 43rd Street, was awarded on May 22, 1908, to the E.E. Smith Construction Company for $2,769.913.97 (equivalent to $99,255,000 in 2025). The New York City Board of Estimate approved the contract on October 29, 1909. Construction on the segment started on December 10, 1909, and was completed in October 1912.

As part of negotiations between New York City, the Brooklyn Rapid Transit Company (BRT), and the Interborough Rapid Transit Company for the expansion of the city's transit network, the line was leased to a subsidiary of the BRT. The agreement, known as Contract 4 of the Dual Contracts, was signed on March 19, 1913. 36th Street opened on June 22, 1915, as part of an extension of the subway to Coney Island, which included the Fourth Avenue Line north of 59th Street as well as the entire Sea Beach Line. The station's opening was marked with a competition between two trains heading from Chambers Street station in Manhattan to the Coney Island station, one heading via the West End Line and the other via the Sea Beach Line; the latter got to Coney Island first. As part of the Dual Contracts, the original southern half of the station was closed to make room for an above-ground connection to the BMT West End Line, and a new northern half was constructed. As an express station, the station was originally 480 feet (150 m) to accommodate eight-car trains.

=== Modifications and later changes ===
==== 1910s to 1930s ====
In 1915, the Sunset Park Civic Association petitioned for the construction of an entrance to the station from 33rd Street and Fourth Avenue. This request was turned down by the New York State Transit Commission. In 1929, the entrances to the station, along with those at Pacific Street and 59th Street, were relocated from the center median of Fourth Avenue to the sidewalks to accommodate the widening of the street. In December 1934, a request to construct an additional entrance to the station was brought before the Public Service Committee of the Merchants and Manufacturers Association of Bush Terminal.

==== 1940s to 1990s ====
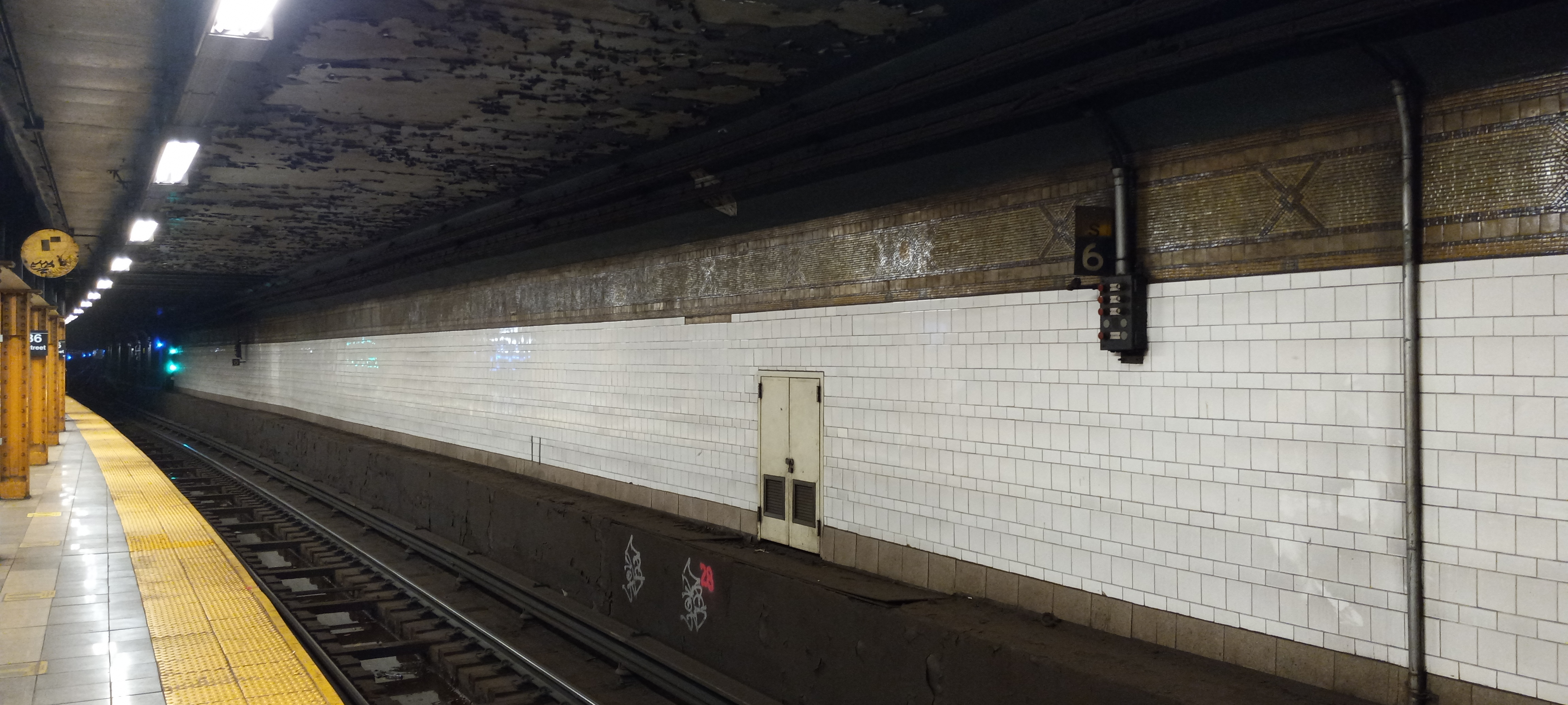
Station tiles next to the northbound local track

The city government took over the BMT's operations on June 1, 1940. In July 1959, the New York City Transit Authority (NYCTA) announced that it would install fluorescent lighting at the 36th Street station and five other stations along the Fourth Avenue Line for between $175,000 and $200,000. Bids on the project were to be advertised on August 7, 1959, and completed by fall 1960.

In the 1960s, the New York City Transit Authority (NYCTA) started a project to lengthen station platforms on its lines in Southern Brooklyn to 615 feet (187 m) to accommodate 10-car trains. On July 14, 1967, the NYCTA awarded a contract to conduct test borings at eleven stations on the Fourth Avenue Line, including 36th Street, to the W. M. Walsh Corporation for $6,585 (equivalent to $63,583 in 2025) in preparation of the construction of platform extensions. The NYCTA issued an invitation for bids on the project to extend the platforms at stations along the Fourth Avenue Line between Pacific Street and 36th Street, on March 28, 1969. Funding for the renovation projects came out of the NYCTA's 1969–1970 Capital Budget, costing $8,177,890 (equivalent to $71,798,000 in 2025) in total.

In June 1980, new telephones were installed on the platform at this station and nine others in Brooklyn, following a request by the New York City Council for their installation in crime-prone subway stations. The MTA added funding for a renovation of the 36th Street station to its 1980–1984 capital plan in 1983. In April 1993, the New York State Legislature agreed to give the MTA $9.6 billion for capital improvements. Some of the funds would be used to renovate nearly one hundred New York City Subway stations, including 36th Street. The station was overhauled from 1996 to 1997; as part of the renovation, the walls were re-tiled. It also included an art installation by Owen Smith called An Underground Movement: Designers, Builders, Riders. It features ceramic mosaics on mezzanine and stairway walls, and depicts the workers that have made the subway system possible.

==== 2000s to present ====
In May 2018, New York City Transit Authority President Andy Byford announced his subway and bus modernization plan, known as Fast Forward, which included making an additional 50 stations compliant with the Americans with Disabilities Act of 1990 during the 2020–2024 Metropolitan Transportation Authority (MTA) Capital Program to allow most riders to have an accessible station every two or three stops. The draft 2020–2024 Capital Program released in September 2019 included 66 stations that would receive ADA improvements, including 36th Street. A contract for two elevators at the station was awarded in December 2023.

A request for proposals was put out on May 18, 2023 for the contract for a project bundle to make 13 stations accessible, including 36th Street. The contract to add two elevators at the station was awarded in December 2023. The MTA announced in 2025 that a customer service center would open at the station. In October 2026, the MTA announced plans to install taller fare gates with glass panels at 20 additional stations, including the 36th Street station, following a successful pilot program at earlier stations.

During the morning rush hour on April 12, 2022, 62-year-old Frank James threw smoke bombs and shot multiple people on a train entering the station; the attack injured 29 people.

== Station layout ==
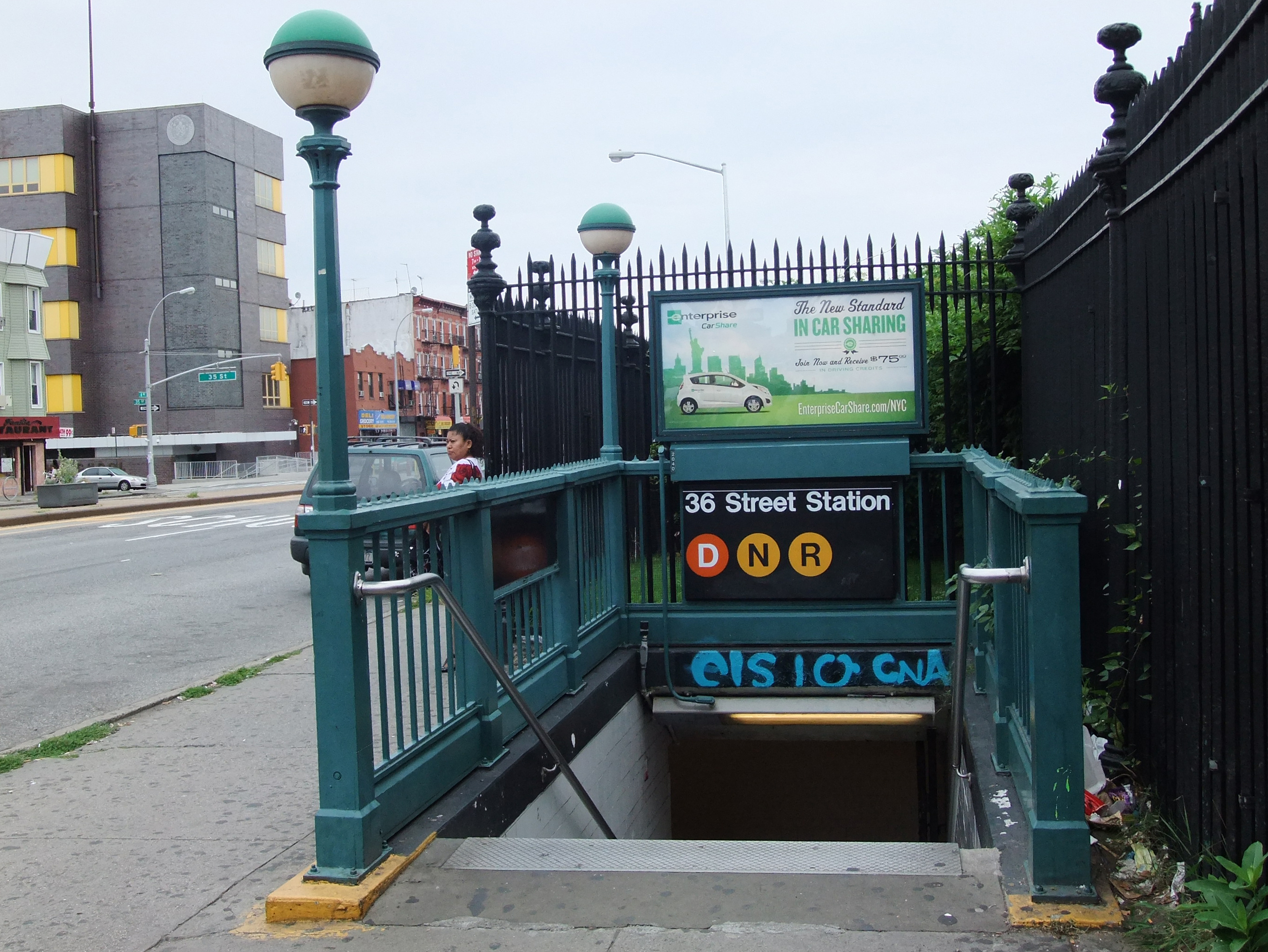
Station entrance

36th Street is an express station with four tracks and two island platforms. R and W trains provide local service, while D and N trains run express, except during nights when they also run local. South of here, N, R, and W trains continue on Fourth Avenue, while D trains diverge east onto the BMT West End Line. The next station to the north is 25th Street for local trains and Atlantic Avenue–Barclays Center for express trains. The next station to the south is 45th Street for local trains, 59th Street for express N trains, and Ninth Avenue for West End D, R, and W trains. This is one of two "36th Street" stations served by the R train; the other is 36th Street on the IND Queens Boulevard Line.

The platforms were originally located further south, and there were two mezzanines, one at either end of the station, the southern exit being near 39th Street. When the West End Line was built, the entire station was shifted northward, and the original southern mezzanine was isolated and closed off. However, the southern mezzanine is still intact; it was converted to a signal relay room and can be reached by an intact stairway in the tunnel. At the south end of the current platforms is the original northern mezzanine at 36th Street.

=== Exits ===
The station's only two exits are from the open mezzanine above the tracks at the very south end of the station. Outside fare control, two street stairs lead to the northwest corner of 4th Avenue and 36th Street. Another street stair leads to the northeast corner.

== Proposed subway under 40th Street ==
There are three abandoned trackways south of the 36th Street station. One trackway merges with the southbound local track, and the other two trackways are south of the tracks that ramp up to the BMT West End Line. The triple trackway ramps down to a lower level, under the mainline tracks, and curves slightly east before ending. On the main track level, a bellmouth going east is visible from a Manhattan-bound local train, just south of this station. When the subway was planned as part of the Triborough System, planners did not anticipate using South Brooklyn Railway's right-of-way near 39th Street, and instead a four-track subway was to be built under 40th Street to reach what is now the Culver and West End lines. The unused junction is to the east side of Fourth Avenue.

== Nearby points of interest ==
- Green-Wood Cemetery
- Industry City
