= N (New York City Subway service) =

Rapid transit service

- Broadway Express

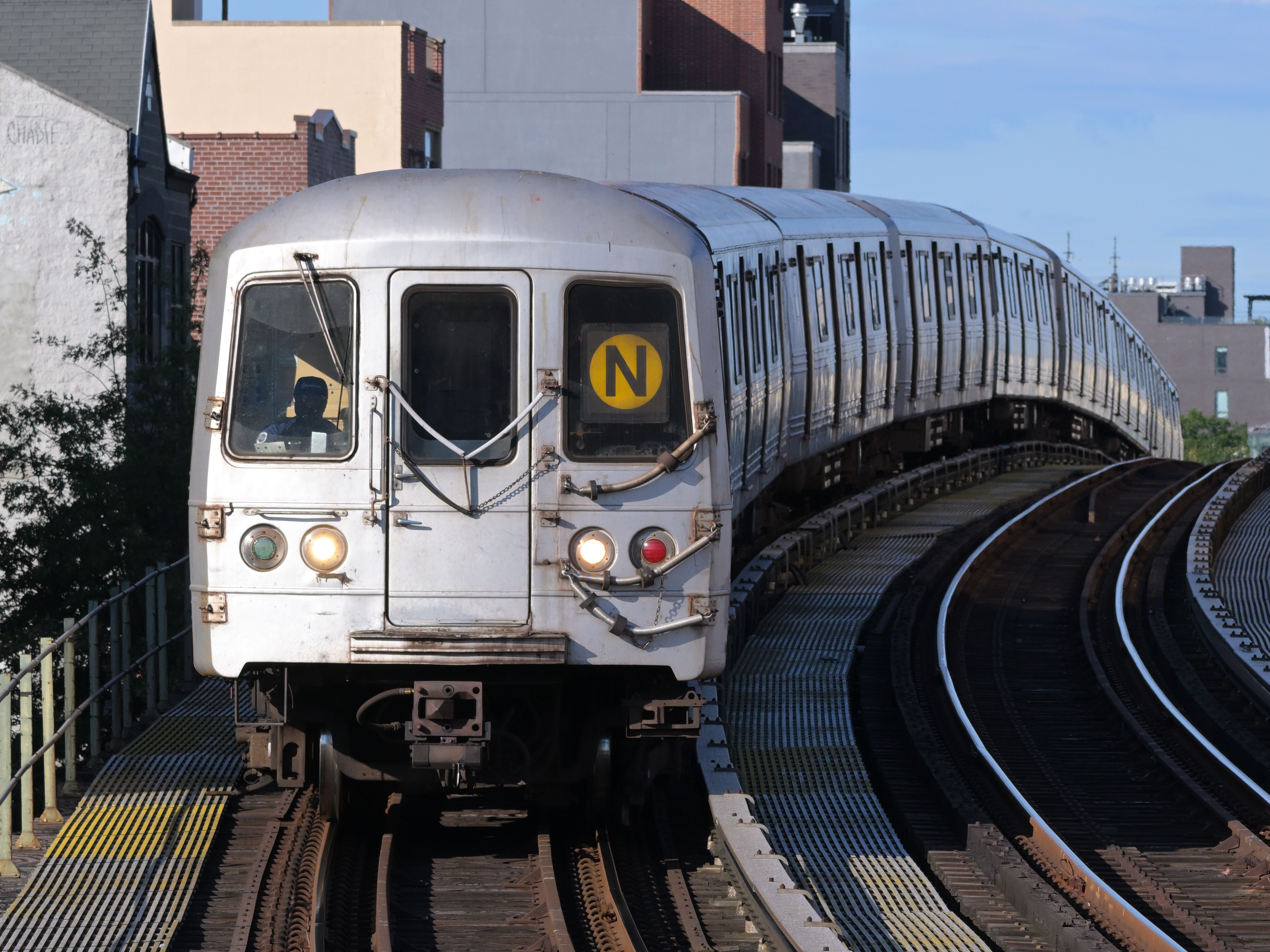
- An N train of R46s approaching 30th Avenue

- Note: Dashed red line shows late night service via the Montague Street Tunnel. Dashed pink line shows limited rush hour service to/from 96th Street.
- Northern end: Astoria–Ditmars Boulevard (all times); 96th Street–Second Avenue (limited rush hour service)
- Southern end: Coney Island–Stillwell Avenue
- Stations: 28 (weekdays); 32 (weekends); 45 (late night service); 22 (limited service)
- Rolling stock: R46; R68; R68A (fleet shared with the) (Rolling stock assignments subject to change)
- Depot: Coney Island Yard
- Started service: June 22, 1915; 111 years ago

The N Broadway Express is a rapid transit service in the B Division of the New York City Subway. Its route emblem, or "bullet," is colored yellow, since it uses the BMT Broadway Line in Manhattan.

The N operates 24 hours daily between Ditmars Boulevard in Astoria, Queens, and Stillwell Avenue in Coney Island, Brooklyn; limited rush hour service originates and terminates at 96th Street on the Upper East Side of Manhattan instead of Ditmars Boulevard. Weekday daytime service makes express stops between 34th Street–Herald Square in Manhattan and 59th Street in Brooklyn and all stops elsewhere. Weekend daytime service is the same as weekday daytime service, except trains make all stops in Manhattan between 34th and Canal Street. Overnight service makes all stops along the full route, serves the Financial District of Lower Manhattan and uses the Montague Street Tunnel to travel between Manhattan and Brooklyn instead of the Manhattan Bridge. (Note: One late-night N train travels north via the Manhattan Bridge instead, making local stops above Canal Street.)

The N was originally the Brooklyn–Manhattan Transit Corporation's 4 service, running along the BMT Sea Beach Line to the Manhattan Bridge. The 4 used the BMT Nassau Street Line in Lower Manhattan from 1915 to 1917, after which it ran express on the BMT Broadway Line. The 4 became the N in 1961. The N ran local in Queens along the IND Queens Boulevard Line to Forest Hills–71st Avenue from 1976 until 1987, when it switched terminals with the R. From 1986 to 2004, reconstruction on the Manhattan Bridge forced the N to run local on the Broadway Line via the Montague Street Tunnel.

== Service history ==
=== Before 1970 ===
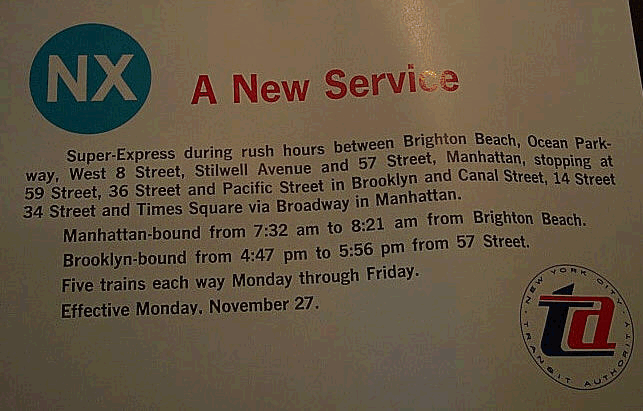
Poster advertising a new NX service

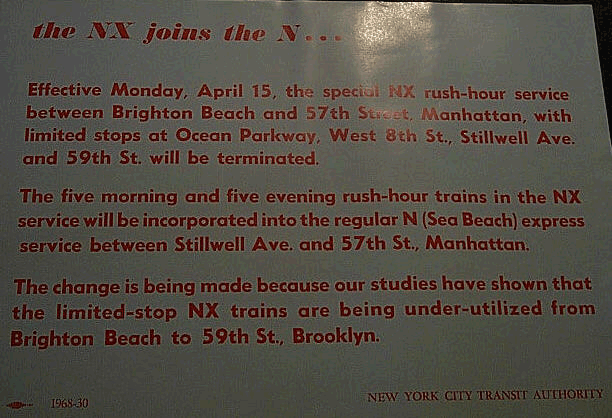
Poster advertising the NX service's discontinuation

The route that is now the N was originally BMT service 4, known as the Sea Beach Line or Sea Beach Express.

On June 22, 1915, the current BMT Sea Beach Line opened, replacing a street level "el" that branched off of the Fifth Avenue El with the former BMT West End Line. Originally, it used the south tracks of the Manhattan Bridge, which at that time connected to the BMT Nassau Street Line. Trains began running express between Pacific Street and 59th Street with the extension of the Fourth Avenue Line to 86th Street.

On September 4, 1917, the first part of the BMT Broadway Line and the north side tracks of the Manhattan Bridge opened. Trains ran from 14th Street–Union Square to Coney Island–Stillwell Avenue, now using the bridge's northern tracks. On January 15, 1918, service was extended to Times Square–42nd Street.

Weekday and Saturday summer trains leaving Coney Island between 6:37 a.m. and 8:37 p.m. began running non-stop between Kings Highway and 59th Street on August 1, 1920. Trains that started at Kings Highway made local stops. On November 14, 1920, weekday rush hour trains, and Saturday AM rush hour trains began skipping Myrtle Avenue and DeKalb Avenue.

Between 1924 and 1926, trains skipped Myrtle Avenue and DeKalb Avenue during weekday rush hours, and on Saturday southbound between 12:01 p.m. and 6:57 p.m. Between 4:30 p.m. and 7:30 p.m. weekdays, and Saturdays southbound between 12:01 p.m. to 6:57 p.m., the rear two cars at Canal Street were restricted to boarding only (no exiting the train). In June 1931, trains skipped Myrtle Avenue and DeKalb Avenue between 7 a.m. and 12:30 a.m. weekdays, and between 10:30 a.m. Sunday to 12:30 a.m. Monday. Trains skipped 36th Street during the morning rush hour in the northbound direction. Between 1933 and 1937, the hours in which trains skipped Myrtle Avenue and DeKalb Avenue were 7 a.m. until midnight weekdays.

On June 29, 1950, trains began running express in Brooklyn during late nights. As of June 28, 1951, every other morning rush hour train no longer terminated at Kings Highway.

On May 2, 1957, service was extended north via the express tracks from Times Square to 57th Street–Seventh Avenue, and trains stopped bypassing 36th Street during the AM rush hour. In fall 1959, trains began stopping at DeKalb Avenue during midday hours. Previously, they bypassed DeKalb Avenue at all times except late nights. Beginning on January 1, 1961, trains bypassed DeKalb Avenue during rush hours only. In addition, on weekday and Saturday evenings, late nights, and all day Sundays, they ran local on the BMT Fourth Avenue Line.

The N designation began to appear when R27 subway cars were moved to the service in April 1961.

The NX designation was used for a rush hour peak-direction "super-express" service along the express tracks of the Sea Beach Line, beginning in the AM rush hour at Brighton Beach on the BMT Brighton Line, running through Coney Island, and then following the N route to 57th Street–Seventh Avenue. (Reverse in the PM rush hour.) This short-lived service began on November 27, 1967 (with the opening of the Chrystie Street Connection) and ended April 12, 1968, due to low ridership. Starting on Monday, April 15, 1968, the five NX trips instead ran as N trips.

On December 31, 1972, all late night trains began running local in Brooklyn. Late weekday evening trains, weekend southbound trains, and northbound early weekday trains began stopping at 53rd Street and 45th Street.

=== 1970–1980 ===
On August 30, 1976, weekday N service was extended north over the BMT 60th Street Tunnel Connection to Forest Hills–71st Avenue to replace the discontinued EE. While many N trains ran the full route from Coney Island to 71st Avenue, via the Manhattan Bridge and Broadway Express, some trains ran local during the rush hours only (southbound in the AM rush hour, and northbound in the PM rush hour) between Whitehall Street–South Ferry in Lower Manhattan and Forest Hills–71st Avenue, which had been the former EE route; these trains were noted with diamond N bullets from 1979. Trains stopped terminating at Kings Highway in the AM rush hour.

On January 24, 1977, as part of a series of NYCTA service cuts to save $13 million, many subway lines began running shorter trains during middays. As part of the change, N trains began running with four cars between 9:30 a.m. and 2:15 p.m. On August 27, 1977, N service was cut back during late nights, only operating between 36th Street and Coney Island. Northbound trains ran express between 59th Street and 36th Street while southbound trains ran local.

=== 1980–1990 ===
On November 26, 1984, evening rush hour trains that terminated at Kings Highway were extended to Coney Island.

Reconstruction of the Manhattan Bridge between 1986 and 2004 disrupted N service, usually rerouting it via the Montague Street Tunnel. On April 26, 1986, the north side tracks (leading to the IND Sixth Avenue Line) were closed and services that normally ran on them were moved to the south side, running via the BMT Broadway Line. Because of the large amount of train traffic now running on those tracks, rush hour and midday N service was rerouted via the Montague Street Tunnel, making local stops in Manhattan and Brooklyn, though evening, night and weekend trains continued to use the bridge and express tracks in Brooklyn. Late evening trains that ran via the bridge also ran local in Brooklyn heading southbound. Six trains only ran between Continental Avenue and Whitehall Street in the AM rush hour, while six trains only ran between Canal Street and Continental Avenue in the PM rush hour. The M, which was rerouted from the BMT Brighton Line to the BMT West End Line, replaced the N as the weekday express on the Fourth Avenue Line. Starting on April 28, 1986, one Q train ran to Continental Avenue at 7:05 a.m., and returned in service as an N train, and an N train arriving at Continental Avenue at 3:25 p.m. began returning in service as a B train. These special B and Q trips no longer ran after May 23, 1987.

As part of the New York City Transit Authority's proposed service plan to serve the new Archer Avenue Line upper level, the N would have been extended to Jamaica Center during weekdays. When N trains terminated at 71st Avenue or 57th Street–Seventh Avenue during weekends and evenings, G trains would have been extended to Jamaica Center, and during late nights a G train shuttle would have run between Jamaica Center and Van Wyck Boulevard. This service plan would have allowed E and F trains to remain on the Queens Boulevard mainline toward 179th Street. The final service plan, which took effect on December 11, 1988, had the extension served by E trains, with R trains extended to 179th Street.

On May 24, 1987, the N swapped northern terminals with the R. The N was switched to Astoria–Ditmars Boulevard, while the R went to Forest Hills–71st Avenue. This was done to give the R direct access to Jamaica Yard; previously, the N had direct access to both Jamaica Yard and Coney Island Yard, and the R, running from Bay Ridge to Astoria, lacked direct access to any yard. This change was intended to improve the appearance and reliability of service on the R, since all trains on the Astoria and Broadway Lines were part of the graffiti-free program. Trains ran via the Manhattan Bridge during late nights and weekends. Some trains went into service at 86th Street during the AM rush hour put-ins. Between November 23, 1987, and May 13, 1988, one D train arrived at Ditmars Boulevard at 7:12 a.m. and returned in service as an N train.

When the north side of the Manhattan Bridge reopened and the south side was closed on December 11, 1988, the N began running local in Manhattan and via the Montague Tunnel at all times. In order to replace B service (Note: Due to construction on the Manhattan Bridge, the B had been split into two services in 1986: the "orange B" on the Sixth Avenue Line from Herald Square to the Bronx, and the "yellow B" on the Broadway Line from Brooklyn to Ditmars Boulevard.) to Ditmars Boulevard, additional N service was provided during rush hours. Trains continued to run express in Brooklyn between Pacific Street and 59th Street/Fourth Avenue evenings and weekends.

On June 11, 1990, trains that were put into service at Queensboro Plaza in the PM rush hour were discontinued. Between June 10, 1990, and July 25, 1992, due to construction work in the 60th Street Tunnel, trains had to use a single track. Trains operated either between Ditmars Boulevard and Canal Street, or between 57th Street and Coney Island.

The Transit Authority and politicians pressured the New York State Department of Transportation to resume N train service on the bridge's south side on September 30, 1990, despite warnings from engineers that the structure was unsafe and major repairs still had to be made. Trains ran express on Broadway in Manhattan (stopping at 49th Street) and Fourth Avenue in Brooklyn at all times except late nights (10 p.m. to 5 a.m.). Southbound Brooklyn expresses ran until late evenings on Saturday, not running on Sunday morning any more. Between early morning and early evenings, trains skipped DeKalb Avenue. Several trains after the AM rush hour went out of service at Kings Highway. On December 27, state inspectors forced N service to be rerouted via the Montague Street Tunnel again after discovery of corroded support beams and missing steel plates, running local on its entire route at all times.

=== 1990–2000 ===
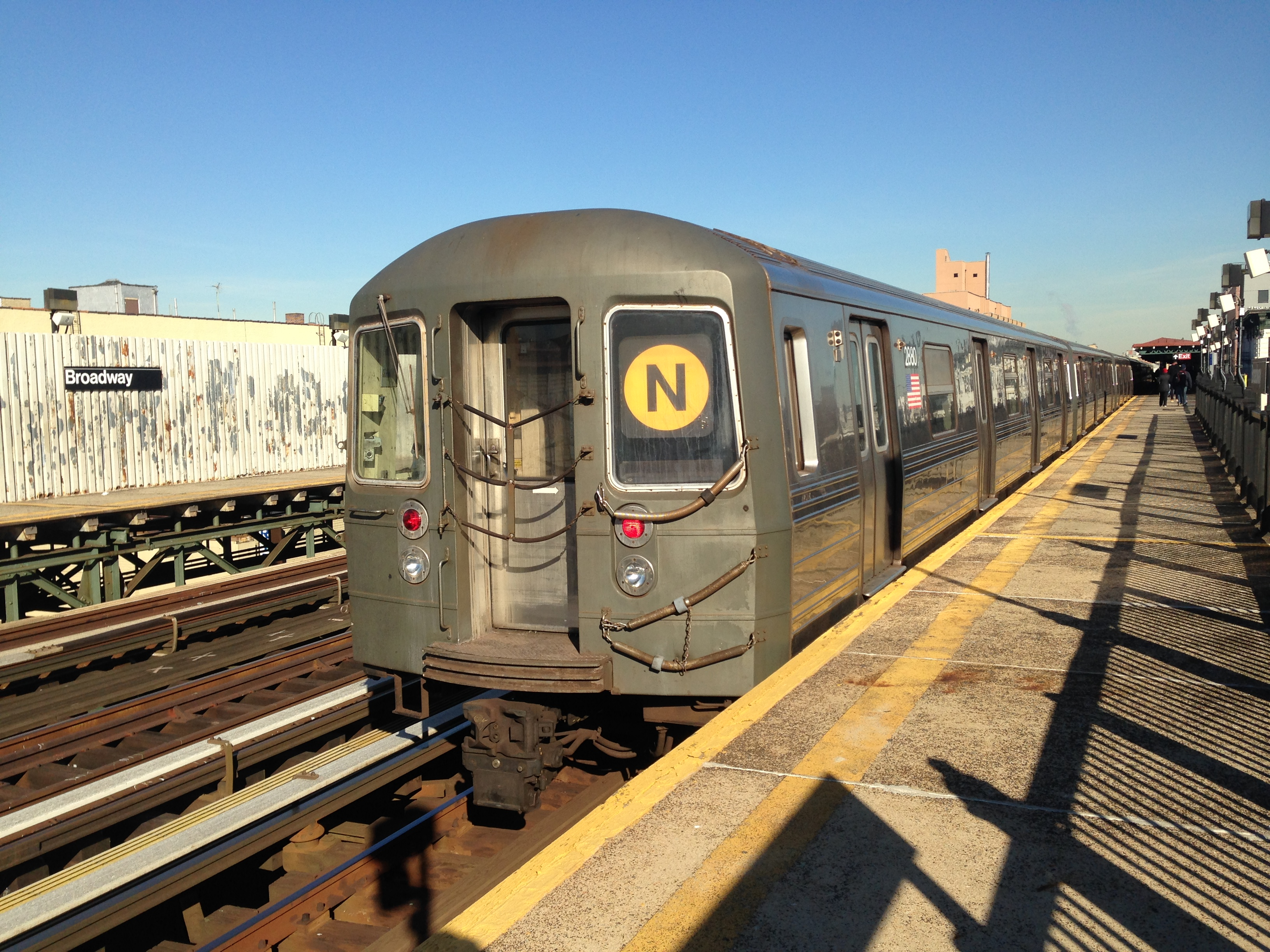
An N train of R68s at Broadway

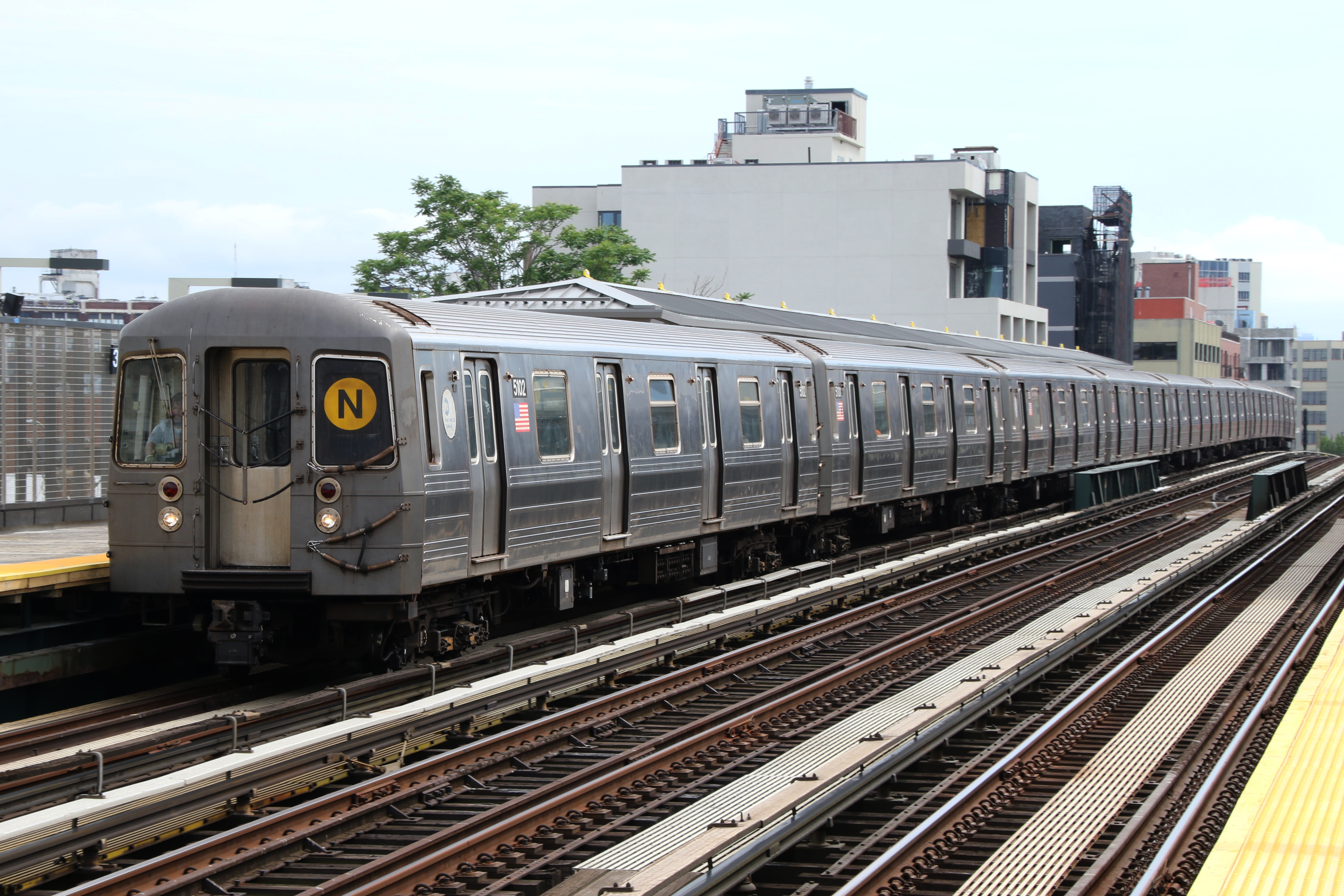
An N train of R68As at 36th Avenue

In November 1993, before the Manhattan Bridge's renovation was completed, the MTA proposed restoring express N service along the Fourth Avenue Line for a six-month trial period, with the M making local stops between Pacific Street and 36th Street. Some residents of Sunset Park, Brooklyn, opposed the proposal, which they claimed would negatively impact about 7,000 daily riders at the 45th Street and 53rd Street stations. On May 31, 1994, the N began running express in Brooklyn between Pacific Street and 59th Street–Fourth Avenue during weekday midday and rush hours, with the M running local during those times. From 1994 to May 22, 1995, the southern terminal of the N was 86th Street due to rehabilitation work at Coney Island–Stillwell Avenue. On November 4, 2001, it was cut back again as the terminal's reconstruction project continued.

From April 30, 1995, to November 12, 1995, the north side of the Manhattan Bridge was closed during weekday midday and weekends for structural repairs. Midday N service ran local in Brooklyn, replacing the M, which was cut back from 9th Avenue to Chambers Street. The N continued to run express during rush hours.

=== 2001–2010 ===
After the September 11, 2001 attacks, N service was initially rerouted between Canal Street and Atlantic Avenue–Pacific Street and operated via the Manhattan Bridge, making all stops along the full route, but was split on the evening of September 12, with the northern section operating between Ditmars Boulevard and 34th Street, and the southern section operating between Court Street and Stillwell Avenue; service in the northern section bypassed 49th Street in both directions. On September 17, N service was completely suspended and was replaced by W trains in Queens, by Q and W trains in Manhattan, and by M trains in Brooklyn. Normal N service was restored on October 28.

On September 8, 2002, because of the ongoing reconstruction of Coney Island terminal, weekend and late night N service was reduced to a shuttle between 86th and Pacific Streets, running express on the BMT Fourth Avenue Line. In its place, the W was extended to Manhattan and Astoria, Queens at all times; this was because the W was the only route still serving Stillwell Avenue during this part of the reconstruction.

On February 22, 2004, the Manhattan Bridge work was finally completed. The N returned to its full route in Manhattan and Queens at all times, and returned to using the Manhattan Bridge at all times except nights (via Fourth Avenue express, bypassing DeKalb Avenue). On weekdays, N trains ran express between 34th Street in Manhattan and 59th Street/Fourth Avenue in Brooklyn via the Manhattan Bridge, and local elsewhere; several trains ran express on the entire Broadway Line and short-turned at 57th Street–Seventh Avenue or Times Square during the morning rush hour. On weekends, it made local stops in Manhattan, but ran express in Brooklyn, using the Bridge. During late nights, it ran local along its entire route via the Montague Street Tunnel, replacing the R train.

On May 29, 2005, the new Stillwell Avenue terminal was completed, and N service between 86th Street and Coney Island was restored.

On June 28, 2010, the N began running local in Manhattan north of Canal Street at all times, replacing the W on weekdays which was discontinued due to budget problems, effectively adopting the weekend service pattern. However, the handful of short-turn N trains continued to run express in Manhattan.

=== 2011–present ===
From August 2, 2013, to September 14, 2014, the Montague Street Tunnel was closed for Hurricane Sandy–related repairs. During this time, overnight N service was rerouted via the Manhattan Bridge, skipping six stations it normally served.

On November 7, 2016, the MTA restored the BMT Broadway Line services to their 2004–2010 service pattern in preparation for the rerouting of the Q train to the Second Avenue Subway. As a result, the N train once again became a weekday express between 34th Street–Herald Square and Canal Street, with local service replaced by the restored W train. The MTA approved the service change on May 23, 2016. All short-turn N trains that originally terminated at 57th Street–Seventh Avenue were extended to 96th Street–Second Avenue on January 3, 2017, following the opening of the Second Avenue Subway.

In January 2017, the MTA revealed plans to rehabilitate the tunnel structure above the BMT Fourth Avenue Line's express tracks between 36th Street and 59th Street. As a result, from July 30, 2018, to July 29, 2019, N trains ran local along that section at all times. Between October 21, 2019, and May 4, 2020, N trains terminated at 86th Street so work could be completed to protect Coney Island Yard from flooding. An out-of-system transfer was available between the N at 86th Street and the F at Avenue X station.

The N began running local in Manhattan in March 2020 after the W was temporarily suspended due to the COVID-19 pandemic; regular N and W service was restored in June. In May 2020, the N began operating local along Fourth Avenue on most weekends to provide a transfer to the F at Fourth Avenue–Ninth Street, since the F was suspended south of Church Avenue due to construction on the IND Culver Line. In August 2023, midday headways on the N were reduced to eight minutes.

== Route ==
=== Signage history ===
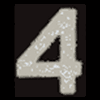
The BMT 4 bullet used on the D Triplex

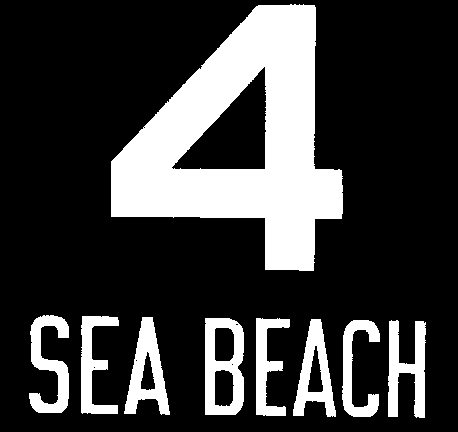
Pre-1967 BMT 4 bullet used on the R1s to R9s

1967-1979 N bullet

1967-1968 NX bullet

1979-1985 Rush hour bullet

The current bullet used since 1979

=== Service pattern ===
The following table shows the lines used by the N, with shaded boxes indicating the route at the specified times:

Line	From	To	Tracks	Times			
Line	From	To	Tracks	rush hours	weekdays	weekends	late nights
IND Second Avenue Line	96th Street	72nd Street	all	Limited service			
BMT 63rd Street Line (full line)	Lexington Avenue–63rd Street		all	Limited service			
BMT Astoria Line (full line)	Astoria–Ditmars Boulevard	Queensboro Plaza	local	Most trains			
60th Street Tunnel			all	Most trains			
BMT Broadway Line (full line)	Lexington Avenue/59th Street	Times Square–42nd Street	local	Most trains			
BMT Broadway Line (full line)	57th Street–Seventh Avenue	Times Square–42nd Street	express	Limited service			
BMT Broadway Line (full line)	34th Street–Herald Square	Canal Street	express				
BMT Broadway Line (full line)	34th Street–Herald Square	Canal Street	local				
BMT Broadway Line (full line)	City Hall	Whitehall Street–South Ferry	all				Most trains
Manhattan Bridge			south				Very limited service
Montague Street Tunnel			all				Most trains
BMT Fourth Avenue Line	Court Street	Jay Street–MetroTech	all				Most trains
BMT Fourth Avenue Line	DeKalb Avenue		tunnel	Limited service (Note: Select rush-hour N trains in the reverse-peak direction provide regular express service in Manhattan but stop at DeKalb Avenue and operate local on the Fourth Avenue Line in Brooklyn. Only one N train with this service pattern provides peak-direction service, roughly an hour before the a.m. rush begins.)			
BMT Fourth Avenue Line	DeKalb Avenue		bypass	Most trains			
BMT Fourth Avenue Line	Atlantic Avenue–Barclays Center	59th Street/Fourth Avenue	express	Most trains			
BMT Fourth Avenue Line	Atlantic Avenue–Barclays Center	59th Street/Fourth Avenue	local	Limited service			
BMT Sea Beach Line (full line)	Eighth Avenue	Coney Island–Stillwell Avenue	local				

=== Stations ===
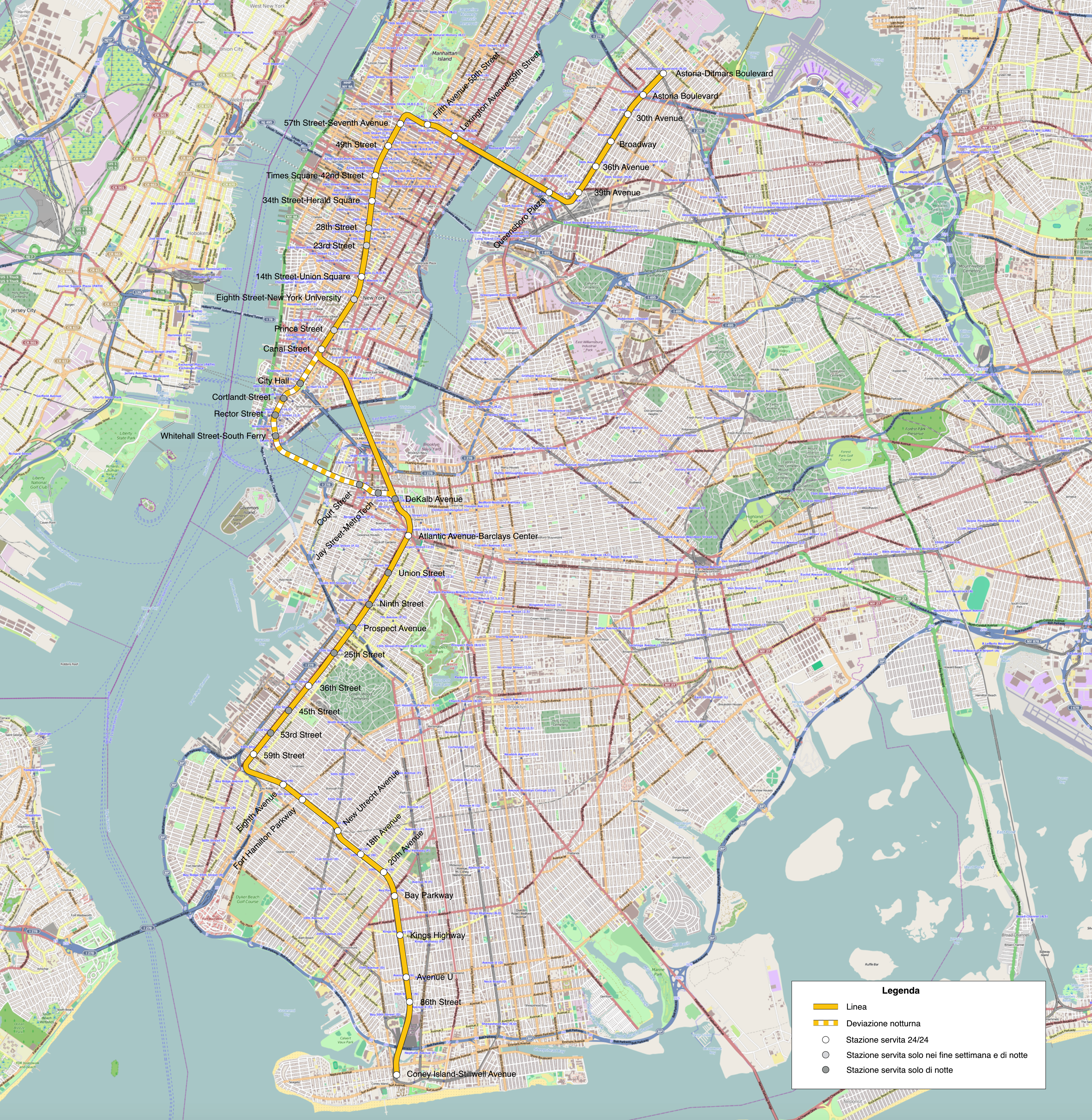
To scale line map

For a more detailed station listing, see the articles on the lines listed above.

Station service legend
Stops all times	Stops 24 hours a day
Stops all times except late nights	Stops every day during daytime hours only
Stops late nights only	Stops every day during overnight hours only
Stops late nights and weekends	Stops everyday during overnight hours and weekends during daytime hours only
Stops weekdays during the day	Stops during weekday daytime hours only
Stops rush hours in the peak direction only	Stops during weekday rush hours in the peak direction only
Station closed	Station closed
Stops rush hours only	Stops rush hours only (limited service)
Stops rush hours in the reverse-peak direction only	Stops rush hours in the reverse-peak direction only (limited service)
Time period details
Disabled access	Station is compliant with the Americans with Disabilities Act
↑	Station is compliant with the Americans with Disabilities Act in the indicated direction only
↓	Station is compliant with the Americans with Disabilities Act in the indicated direction only
	Elevator access to mezzanine only

Ast.		96th	Stations	Disabled access	Subway transfers	Connections and notes
Manhattan
Second Avenue Line (limited rush hour service only)
—N/a		Stops rush hours only (limited service)	96th Street	Disabled access	Q	M15 Select Bus Service
—N/a		Stops rush hours only (limited service)	86th Street	Disabled access	Q R	M15 Select Bus Service; M86 Select Bus Service
—N/a		Stops rush hours only (limited service)	72nd Street	Disabled access	Q R	M15 Select Bus Service
63rd Street Line (limited rush hour service only)
—N/a		Stops rush hours only (limited service)	Lexington Avenue–63rd Street	Disabled access	F M Q R Out-of-system transfers with MetroCard/OMNY: 4 5 6 <6> (IRT Lexington Avenue Line at 59th Street); N R W (BMT Broadway Line at Lexington Avenue–59th Street)	
Queens
Astoria Line
Stops all times		—N/a	Astoria–Ditmars Boulevard		W	
Stops all times		—N/a	Astoria Boulevard	Disabled access	W	M60 Select Bus Service to LaGuardia Airport
Stops all times		—N/a	30th Avenue		W	
Stops all times		—N/a	Broadway		W	
Stops all times		—N/a	36th Avenue		W	
Stops all times		—N/a	39th Avenue		W	
Stops all times		—N/a	Queensboro Plaza	Disabled access	W 7 <7> (IRT Flushing Line)	
Manhattan
Broadway Line
Stops all times		—N/a	Lexington Avenue–59th Street		R W 4 5 6 <6> (IRT Lexington Avenue Line at 59th Street); Out-of-system transfer with MetroCard/OMNY: F M N Q R (63rd Street Lines at Lexington Avenue–63rd Street)	Roosevelt Island Tramway. Northern terminal for severe weather trips.
Stops all times		—N/a	Fifth Avenue–59th Street		R W	
Services to 96th Street (Manhattan) and Astoria–Ditmars Boulevard (Queens) split
Broadway Line (Astoria and Second Avenue branches merge)
Stops all times		Stops rush hours only (limited service)	57th Street–Seventh Avenue	Disabled access	Q R W	
Stops all times		|	49th Street	↑	Q R W	Station is ADA-accessible in the northbound direction only.
Stops all times		Stops rush hours only (limited service)	Times Square–42nd Street	Disabled access	Q R W 1 2 3 (IRT Broadway–Seventh Avenue Line); 7 <7> (IRT Flushing Line); A C E (IND Eighth Avenue Line at 42nd Street–Port Authority Bus Terminal); S (42nd Street Shuttle); B D F <F> M (IND Sixth Avenue Line at 42nd Street–Bryant Park, daytime only)	Port Authority Bus Terminal; M34A Select Bus Service
Stops all times		Stops rush hours only (limited service)	34th Street–Herald Square	Disabled access	Q R W B D F <F> M (IND Sixth Avenue Line)	M34 / M34A Select Bus Service; PATH at 33rd Street; Amtrak, LIRR, NJ Transit at Pennsylvania Station
Stops late nights and weekends		|	28th Street		Q R	
Stops late nights and weekends		|	23rd Street		Q R	M23 Select Bus Service
Stops all times		Stops rush hours only (limited service)	14th Street–Union Square	Disabled access	Q R W L (BMT Canarsie Line); 4 5 6 <6> (IRT Lexington Avenue Line)	M14A / M14D Select Bus Service
Stops late nights and weekends		|	Eighth Street–New York University		Q R	
Stops late nights and weekends		|	Prince Street		Q R	
Manhattan Bridge branch
Stops all times except late nights		Stops rush hours only (limited service)	Canal Street	Elevator access to mezzanine only	Q R W 6 <6> (IRT Lexington Avenue Line); J Z (BMT Nassau Street Line)	Stops on the lower level, under Canal Street.
Lower Manhattan branch (night service only)
Stops late nights only		—N/a	Canal Street	Elevator access to mezzanine only	Q 4 6 (IRT Lexington Avenue Line); J (BMT Nassau Street Line)	Stops on the upper level, under Broadway. (Note: One late-night N train via the Manhattan Bridge stops on the lower level.)
Stops late nights only		—N/a	City Hall			
Stops late nights only		—N/a	Cortlandt Street	Disabled access	2 (IRT Broadway–Seventh Avenue Line at Park Place); A (IND Eighth Avenue Line at Chambers Street); E (IND Eighth Avenue Line at World Trade Center)	PATH at World Trade Center
Stops late nights only		—N/a	Rector Street			
Stops late nights only		—N/a	Whitehall Street–South Ferry	Elevator access to mezzanine only	R 1 (IRT Broadway–Seventh Avenue Line at South Ferry)	Staten Island Ferry at Whitehall Terminal
Brooklyn
Montague Street branch
Stops late nights only		—N/a	Court Street	Elevator access to mezzanine only	R 2 (IRT Broadway–Seventh Avenue Line at Borough Hall); 4 (IRT Eastern Parkway Line at Borough Hall)	
Stops late nights only		—N/a	Jay Street–MetroTech	Disabled access	R A F (IND Fulton Street and Culver Lines)	
Fourth Avenue Line (tunnel and bridge branches merge)
Stops rush hours in the reverse-peak direction only	Stops late nights only	|	DeKalb Avenue	Disabled access	B D Q R W	
Stops all times		Stops rush hours only (limited service)	Atlantic Avenue–Barclays Center	Disabled access	D R W B Q (BMT Brighton Line); 2 3 4 5 (IRT Eastern Parkway Line)	LIRR Atlantic Branch at Atlantic Terminal
Stops rush hours in the reverse-peak direction only	Stops late nights only	|	Union Street		D R W	
Stops rush hours in the reverse-peak direction only	Stops late nights only	|	Ninth Street		D R W F G (IND Culver Line at Fourth Avenue)	
Stops rush hours in the reverse-peak direction only	Stops late nights only	|	Prospect Avenue		D R W	
Stops rush hours in the reverse-peak direction only	Stops late nights only	|	25th Street		D R W	
Stops all times		Stops rush hours only (limited service)	36th Street		D R W	
Stops rush hours in the reverse-peak direction only	Stops late nights only	|	45th Street		R W	
Stops rush hours in the reverse-peak direction only	Stops late nights only	|	53rd Street		R W	
Stops all times		Stops rush hours only (limited service)	59th Street	Disabled access	R W	
Sea Beach Line
Stops all times		Stops rush hours only (limited service)	Eighth Avenue	Disabled access	W	
Stops all times		Stops rush hours only (limited service)	Fort Hamilton Parkway		W	
Stops all times		Stops rush hours only (limited service)	New Utrecht Avenue	Disabled access	W D R W (BMT West End Line at 62nd Street)	
Stops all times		Stops rush hours only (limited service)	18th Avenue		W	
Stops all times		Stops rush hours only (limited service)	20th Avenue		W	
Stops all times		Stops rush hours only (limited service)	Bay Parkway		W	
Stops all times		Stops rush hours only (limited service)	Kings Highway		W	B82 Select Bus Service
Stops all times		Stops rush hours only (limited service)	Avenue U		W	
Stops all times		Stops rush hours only (limited service)	86th Street		W	Southern terminal for select rush-hour trains (Note: Eight trains in the a.m. rush and two trains in the p.m. rush originate from this station; two trains in the a.m. rush terminate here.)
Stops all times		Stops rush hours only (limited service)	Coney Island–Stillwell Avenue	Disabled access	D (BMT West End Line); F <F> (IND Culver Line); Q (BMT Brighton Line)	
