= 59th Street station (BMT Fourth Avenue Line) =

New York City Subway station in Brooklyn

59 Street
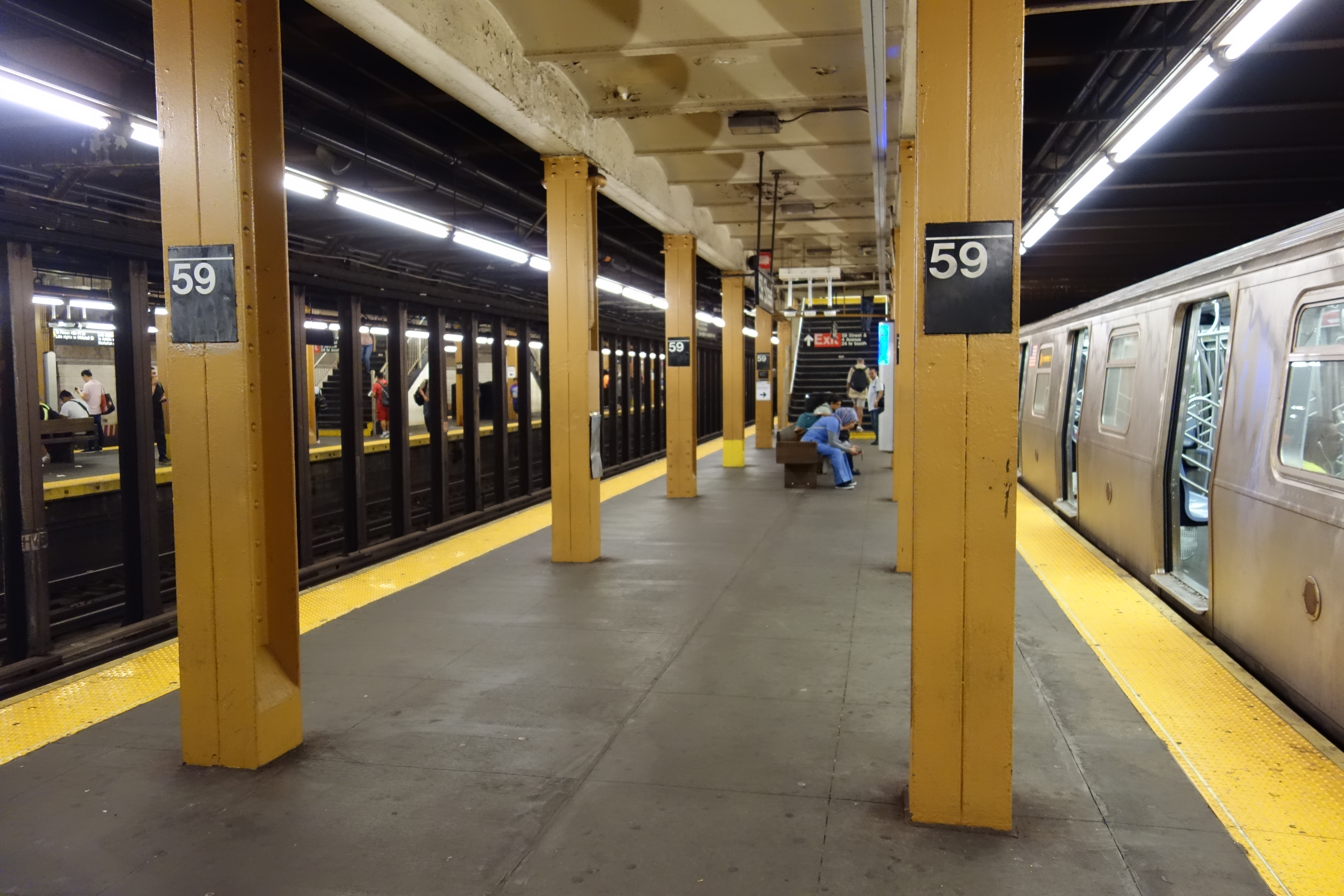
- Looking south on the southbound platform. An R160 R train is visible on the southbound local track.

Station statistics
- Address: 59th Street & Fourth Avenue; Brooklyn, New York
- Borough: Brooklyn
- Locale: Sunset Park
- Coordinates: 40°38′29″N 74°01′04″W
- Division: B (BMT)
- Line: BMT Fourth Avenue Line
- Services: N (all times); R (all times); W (limited rush hour service only)
- Transit: NYCT Bus: B9; NYC Ferry: Rockaway, South Brooklyn (at Brooklyn Army Terminal)
- Structure: Underground
- Platforms: 2 island platforms cross-platform interchange
- Tracks: 4

Other information
- Opened: June 22, 1915 (111 years ago)
- Accessible: Yes

Traffic
- 2025: 3,269,987 ▲11.1%
- Rank: 115 out of 423
Services
Preceding station	New York City Subway	Following station
36th Street N toward Astoria–Ditmars Boulevard	Express	Eighth Avenue N W toward Coney Island–Stillwell Avenue
53rd Street N R W toward Forest Hills–71st Avenue	Local	Bay Ridge Avenue R toward Bay Ridge–95th Street
Location
Location within New York City Subway
Location within New York City
Location within New York
Track layout
Street map
Station service legend
Symbol	Description
Stops all times except late nights	Stops all times except late nights
Stops all times	Stops all times
Stops late nights only	Stops late nights only
Stops rush hours only	Stops rush hours only
Stops rush hours in the peak direction only	Stops rush hours in the peak direction only

The 59th Street station is an express station on the BMT Fourth Avenue Line of the New York City Subway. Located at 59th Street and Fourth Avenue in Sunset Park, Brooklyn, it is served by the N and R trains at all times. During rush hours, several W trains also serve the station.

The 59th Street station was constructed as part of the Fourth Avenue Line, which was approved in 1905. Construction on the segment of the line that includes 59th Street started on March 15, 1913, and was completed in 1915. The station opened on June 22, 1915, as the southernmost station of the initial portion of the BMT Fourth Avenue Line. The station's platforms were lengthened in 1926–1927, and again during the 1960s. Elevator access was added in late 2020, in tandem with a station renovation between 2018 and 2020 to make the station compliant with the Americans with Disabilities Act of 1990.

== History ==
=== Construction ===
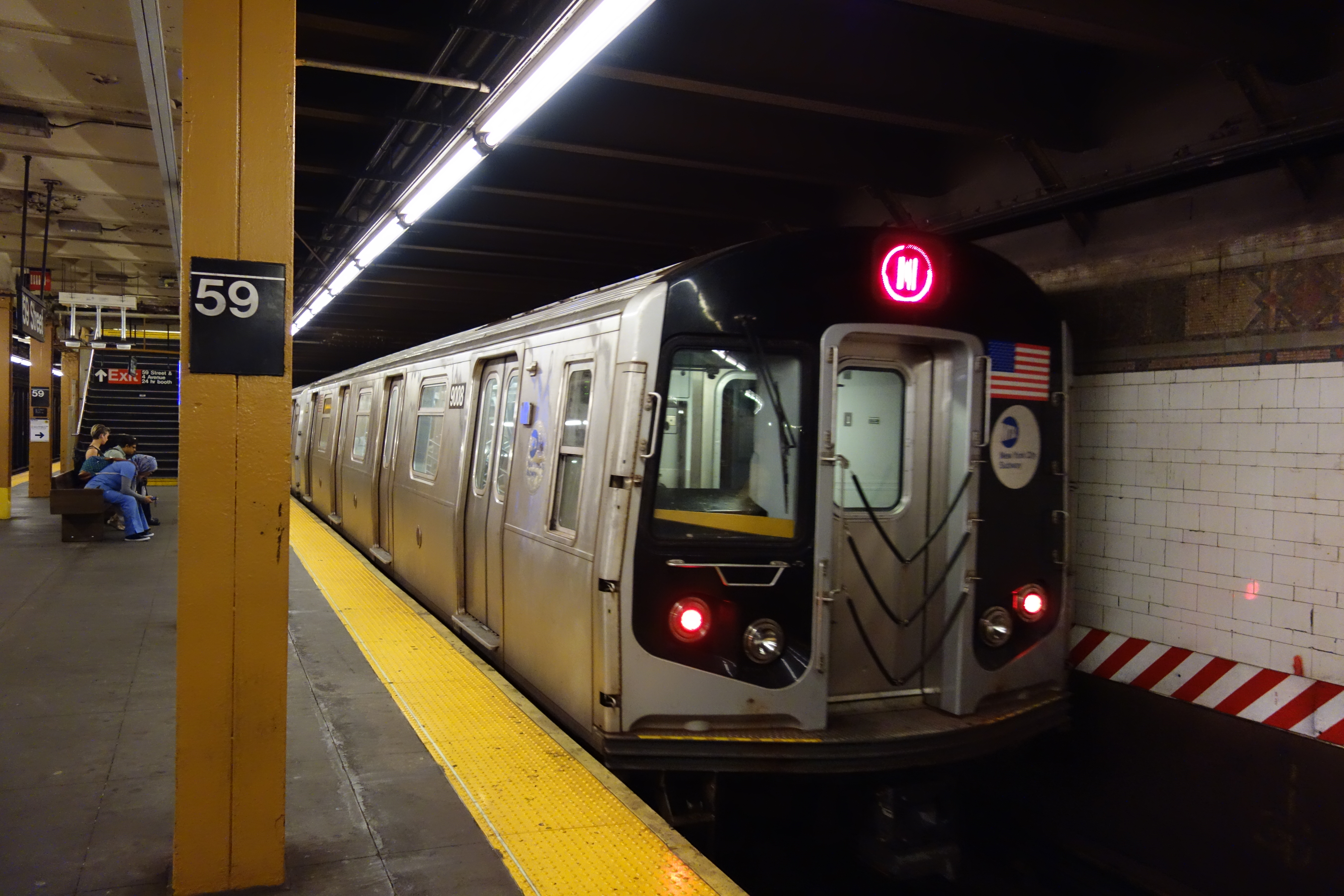
A Coney Island-bound N train of R160s leaving the station

The 59th Street station was constructed as part of the Fourth Avenue Line, the plan for which was initially adopted on June 1, 1905. The Rapid Transit Commission was succeeded on July 1, 1907, by the New York State Public Service Commission (PSC), which approved the plan for the line in late 1907.

As part of negotiations between New York City, the Brooklyn Rapid Transit Company (BRT), and the Interborough Rapid Transit Company for the expansion of the city's transit network, the line was leased to a subsidiary of the BRT. The agreement, known as Contract 4 of the Dual Contracts, was signed on March 19, 1913. In 1912, during the Dual System negotiations, the construction of an extension of the Fourth Avenue subway from 43rd Street to 89th Street, just south of the 86th Street station, was recommended. The proposal was approved by the Board of Estimate on February 15, 1912. The PSC directed its chief engineer to create plans on June 14, 1912. The two contracts for the extension, Route 11B, were awarded on September 16, 1912, to the Degnon Construction Company for a combined $3.8 million (equivalent to $126.8 million in 2025).

Construction on Route 11B1, the section of the extension between 43rd Street and 61st Street, which includes the 59th Street station, began on March 15, 1913. Originally, this section was planned to have two tracks, but after the connection to the Sea Beach Line was added to the plan during the middle of construction, the plan was changed to four tracks. This section was completed in 1915. 59th Street opened on June 22, 1915, as part of an extension of the subway to Coney Island, which included the segment of the Fourth Avenue Line to the north of the station, as well as the entire Sea Beach Line to the south. The station's opening was marked with a competition between two trains heading from Chambers Street station in Manhattan to the Coney Island station, one heading via the West End Line and the other via the Sea Beach Line; the latter got to Coney Island first. Since 59th Street was an express station, the platforms were originally 480 feet (150 m) long, allowing eight-car express trains to stop there.

=== Modifications and later changes ===
On June 27, 1922, the New York State Transit Commission commissioned its engineers to examine platform-lengthening plans for 23 stations on the lines of the Brooklyn–Manhattan Transit Corporation (BMT), the successor to the BRT, to accommodate eight-car trains. As part of the project, 59th Street's platforms would have been lengthened from 480 feet (150 m) to 530 feet (160 m). Though the Transit Commission ordered the BMT to lengthen these platforms in September 1923, no further progress was made until February 16, 1925, when the New York City Board of Transportation (NYCBOT) commissioned its engineers to examine platform-lengthening plans for this and eleven other stations along the Fourth Avenue Line. It estimated the project would cost $633,000 (equivalent to $11,621,000 in 2025). The NYCBOT received bids for the project on February 25, 1926. The contract was awarded to the Corson Construction Company for $345,021 (equivalent to $6,275,000 in 2025). The extensions opened on August 1, 1927.

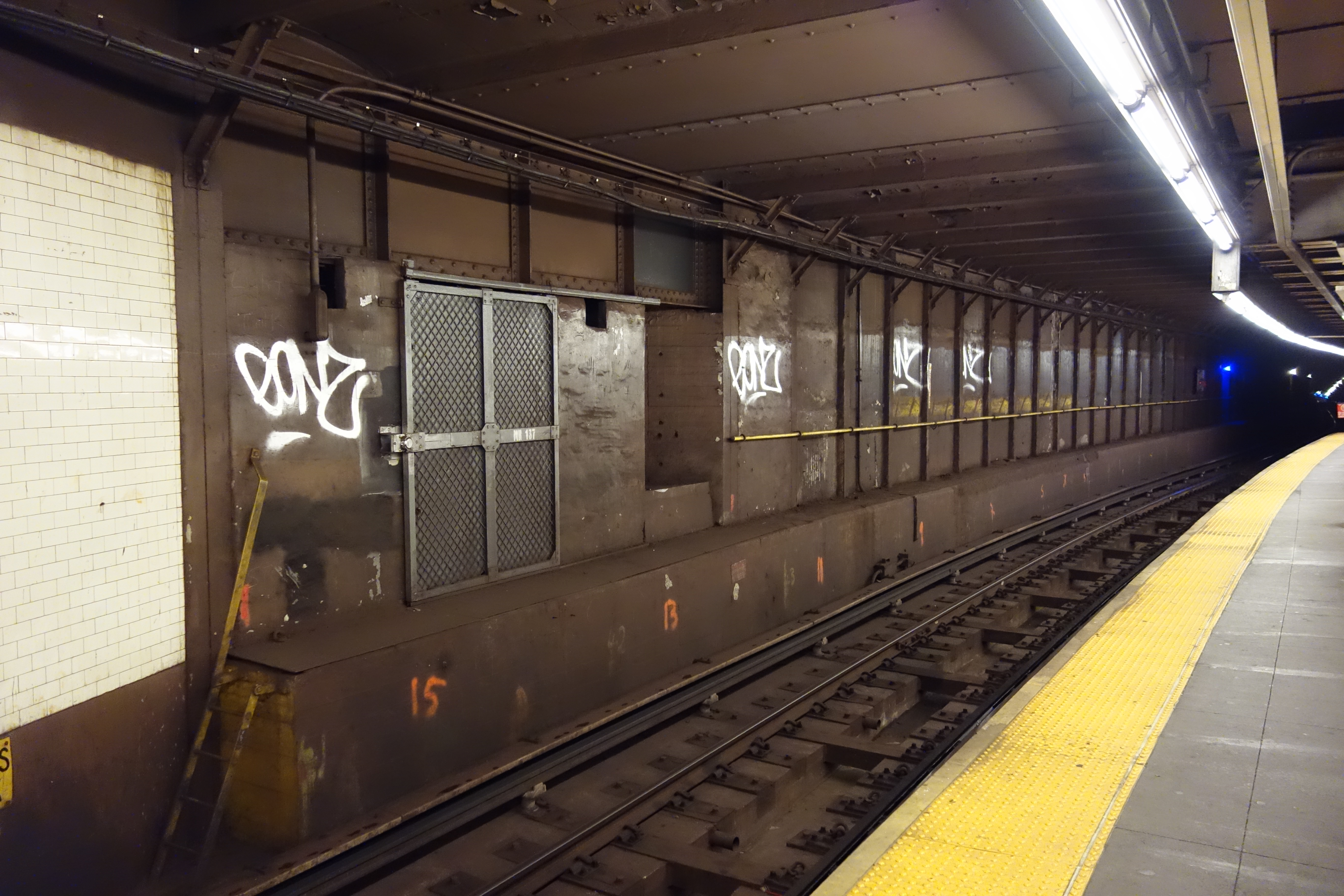
A view of the former tunnel wall at the north end of the station, where the platforms were extended in 1970

The city government took over the BMT's operations on June 1, 1940. In the 1960s, the New York City Transit Authority (NYCTA) started a project to lengthen station platforms on its lines in Southern Brooklyn to 615 feet (187 m) to accommodate 10-car trains. On July 14, 1967, the NYCTA awarded a contract to conduct test borings at eleven stations on the Fourth Avenue Line, including 59th Street, to the W. M. Walsh Corporation for $6,585 (equivalent to $63,583 in 2025) in preparation of the construction of platform extensions. The NYCTA issued an invitation for bids on the project to extend the platforms at stations along the Fourth Avenue Line between 45th Street station and Bay Ridge–95th Street, including this station, on May 3, 1968. However, work had already started on the platform extension project in February. The platforms were extended by 85 feet (26 m) to the north.

In 1983, the MTA added funding for a renovation of the 59th Street station to its 1980–1984 capital plan. Elevator access for this station had been proposed for the late 2010s. However, the installation of elevators was delayed due to a column replacement project above this section of the Fourth Avenue Line. Both the column replacement and the elevator installation required temporary lane closures on Fourth Avenue, a major artery. An elevator contract was supposed to be awarded in November 2016, but was pushed back to July 2018. A $55.2 million contract for the installation of three elevators at the 59th Street station was awarded in late 2018. Substantial completion was expected in July 2020, but the project was delayed and the elevators opened on November 6, 2020. The final component of the project was completed in June 2021.

== Station layout ==
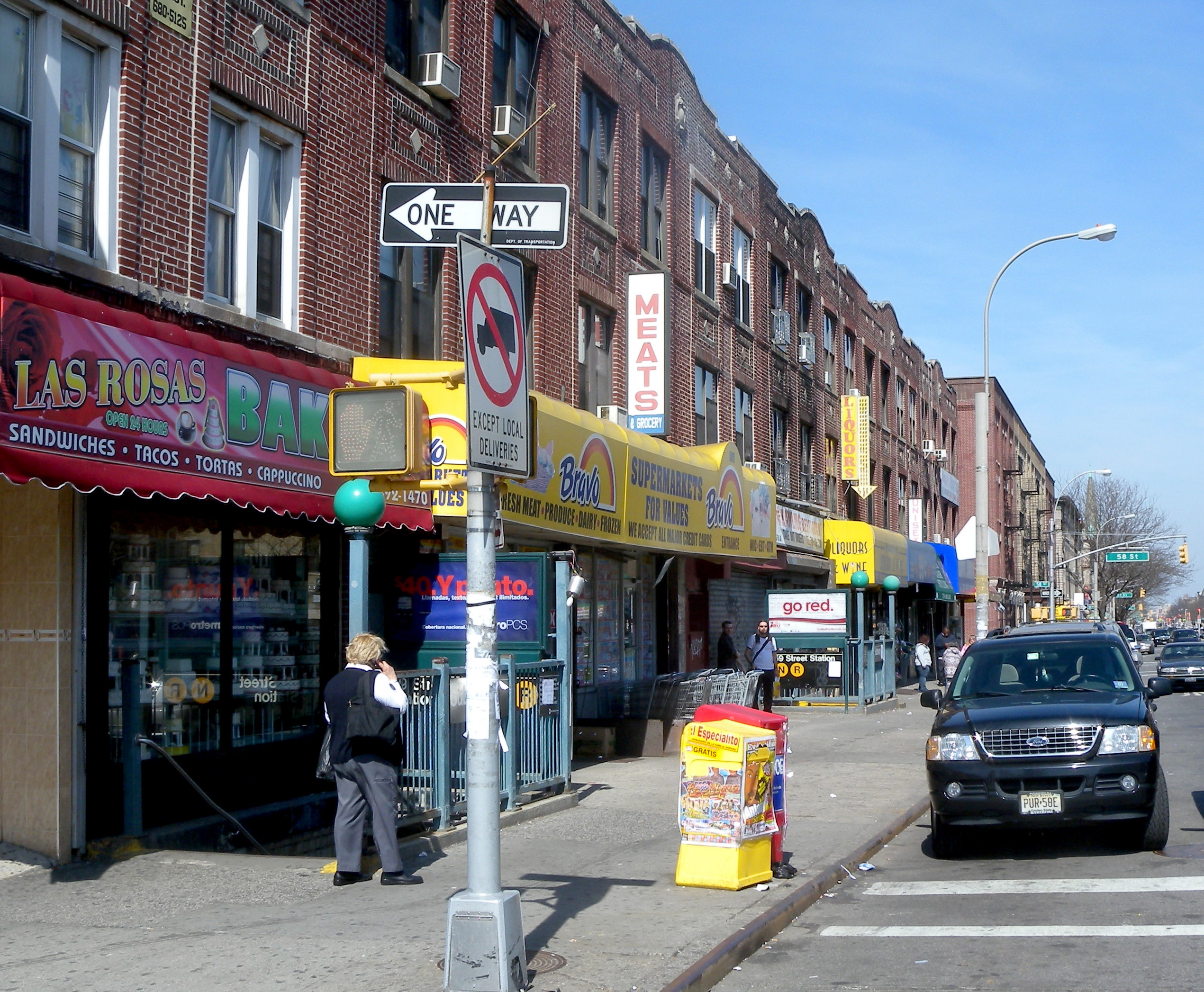
Northwestern street stairs at 59th Street and Fourth Avenue prior to elevator installation

This station is the southernmost four-track express station on the Fourth Avenue Line with two island platforms. The N and R stop here at all times, while some rush-hour W trains stop here in the peak direction. The R and W always run local, while the N runs express during the day and local at night. The next station to the north is 53rd Street for local trains and 36th Street for express trains. The next station to the south is Bay Ridge Avenue for R trains and Eighth Avenue for N and W trains.

South of the station are diamond crossovers between each pair of local and express tracks. They are used by the N at night as well as limited W trains during rush hours. The R continues south along Fourth Avenue to Bay Ridge–95th Street while the N and W turn east and branch off to the BMT Sea Beach Line.

The station walls have mosaic trim lines on top of the white tiles, and spell 59th Street at intervals. The northern sections of the station are where the platforms were extended in 1970, and they have no mosaic trims or tiles along the wall, instead including an extension of the tunnel benchwall. Two sets of columns run along the entire length of both platforms and are painted yellow. The mosaic trim lines are also present in the mezzanines. At the top of the pairs of staircases to each of the platforms, in the trim lines, there are directional mosaics. Those to the Brooklyn-bound platform say "UP TOWN TRAINS", while those to the Manhattan-bound platform say "DOWN TOWN TRAINS".

=== Exits ===
The street-level entrances are at the southern end of the station, with one entrance along either side of Fourth Avenue between 60th and 61st Streets. This part-time exit is unstaffed and has High Entry-Exit Turnstiles. There are also four exits to Fourth Avenue and 59th Street, which includes two staircases to the northeast corner, along with one staircase and elevator to the northwest corner, at the north end of the station. Each entrance has its own small mezzanine, and allows for crossovers between platforms.

== Provisions for proposed extensions ==
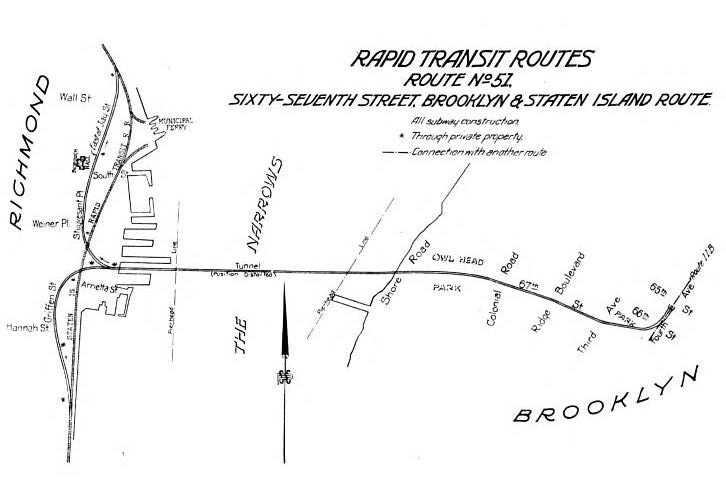
The proposed Staten Island Tunnel would have branched off at 66th Street

Immediately south of the station, there are tunnel stub headings running straight from the local tracks. They run for about 150 feet (46 m) and would have been for a line to Staten Island via the Staten Island Tunnel under the Narrows, which was aborted by Mayor Hylan before it was completed. There is a "maintenance of way" shed that was built on the southbound trackway. The northbound trackway is unobstructed, albeit much darker. The northbound trackway ends on a brick wall, with evidence of a void space beyond. South of this station, the bridge over the LIRR Bay Ridge Branch has four trackways, with the outer tracks occupying the two western ones. The tracks of the BMT Fourth Avenue Line are under the western half of Fourth Avenue at this point so that two additional tracks could be laid in the future if traffic warranted it.

The original proposal planned a connection from a point between 65th and 67th Streets, just south of the station, running to Arrietta Street near the Tompkinsville station in Tompkinsville, Staten Island. A later plan called for a connection to St. George, Staten Island, near St. George Terminal. Construction for the latter started in 1923, but the project was canceled in 1925.

== Points of interest ==
The Basilica of Our Lady of Perpetual Help, the largest church in Brooklyn, is located one block east on Fifth Avenue between 59th and 60th Streets. The Brooklyn Army Terminal is located two blocks west, along with the NYC Ferry pier there, though there is no free transfer between the subway and the ferry.
