= Fort Hamilton Parkway (disambiguation) =

Fort Hamilton Parkway is a parkway in Brooklyn, New York.

Fort Hamilton Parkway also refers to subway stations near the parkway:

- Fort Hamilton Parkway (IND Culver Line), serving the F and G trains
- Fort Hamilton Parkway (BMT Culver Line), now demolished
- Fort Hamilton Parkway (BMT West End Line), serving the D train
- Fort Hamilton Parkway (BMT Sea Beach Line), serving the N and W train
