= Bocchino =

Bocchino is a surname. Notable people with the name include:

- Giorgio Bocchino (1913–1995), Italian fencer
- Italo Bocchino (born 1967), Italian politician and journalist
- Riccardo Bocchino (born 1988), Italian rugby union player
- Simone Bocchino (born 1978), Italian sound engineer, composer and producer

== See also ==
- Bocchino-Dente Memorial Plaza, is a plaza in the Borough Park section of Brooklyn, New York
