= Fort Hamilton Parkway =

Avenue in Brooklyn, New York

- Fort Hamilton Avenue
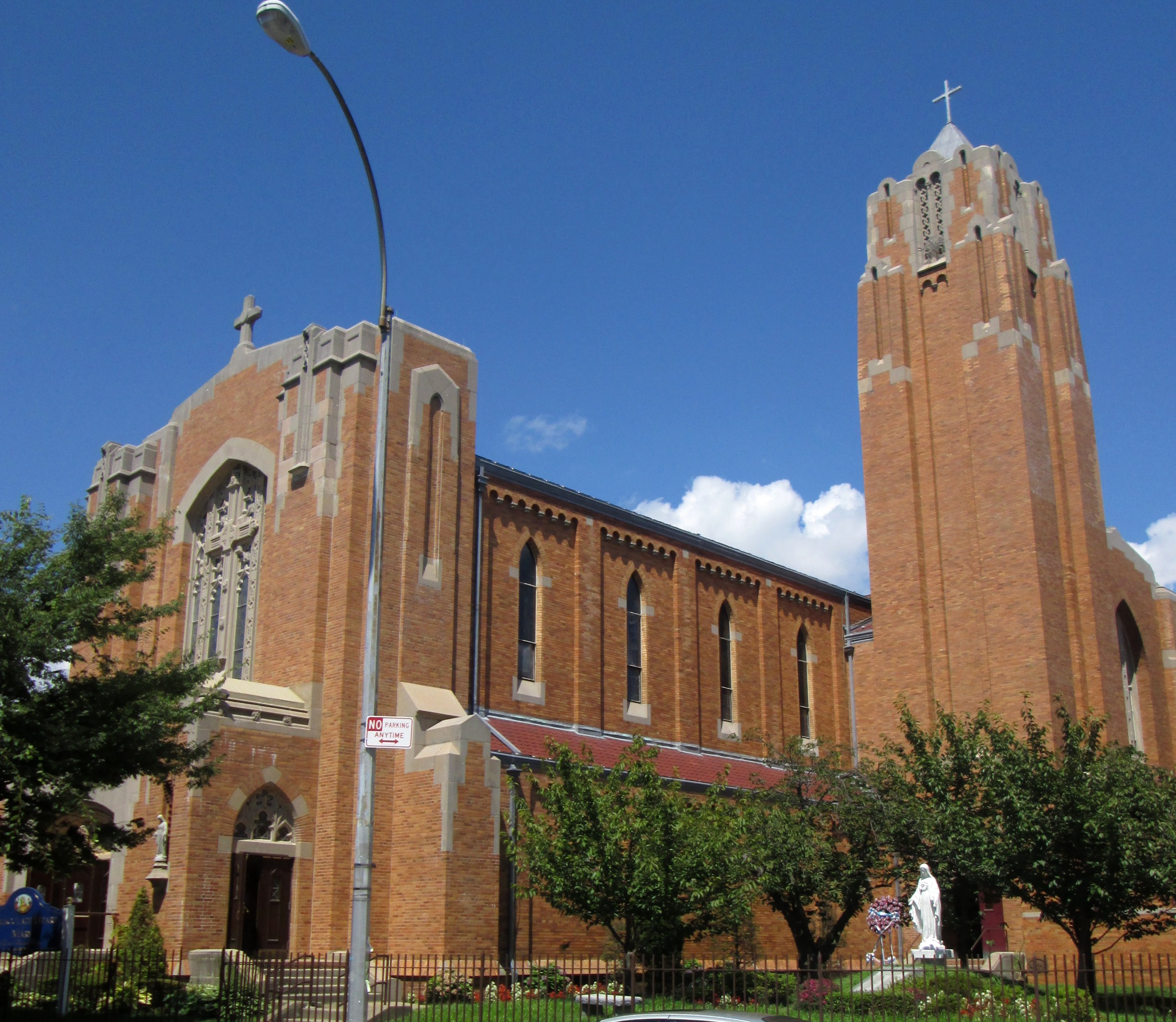
- Immaculate Heart of Mary Church along Fort Hamilton Parkway
- Interactive map of Fort Hamilton Parkway
- Type: Parkway
- Maintained by: NYSDOT and NYCDOT
- Length: 4.1 mi (6.6 km)
- Restrictions: No commercial vehicles
- Location: Brooklyn, New York
- Southwest end: 4th Avenue
- Northeast end: Coney Island Avenue

Other
- Status: Parkway

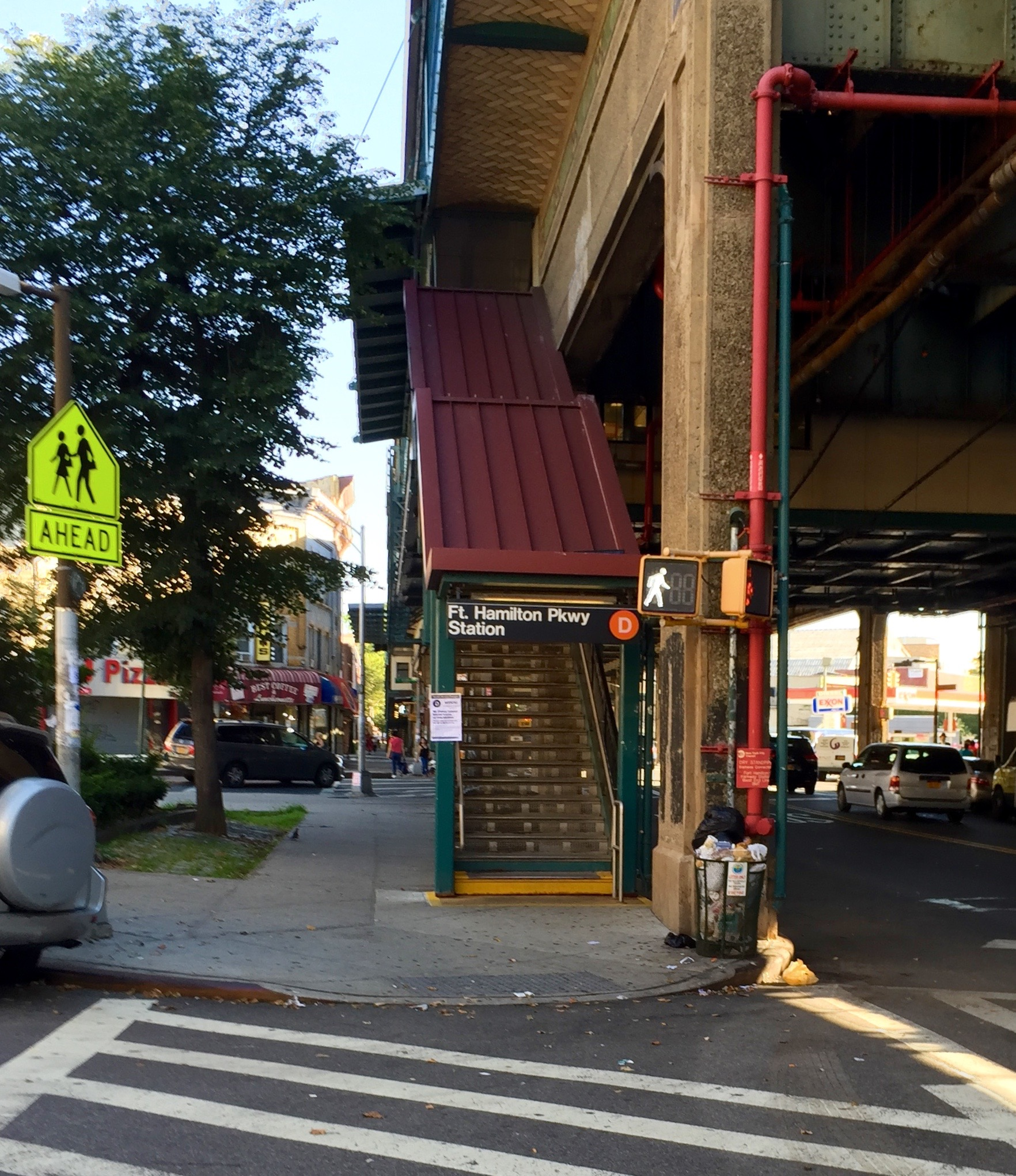
Entrance to Fort Hamilton Parkway station, served by the D train

Fort Hamilton Parkway is a parkway in Brooklyn, New York. It runs for 4.1 miles from the neighborhood of Windsor Terrace to Bay Ridge, its southern end at the entrance to its namesake military base at Fort Hamilton.

== History ==
Originally known as Fort Hamilton Avenue, it was renamed by the state legislature as a parkway in 1892, along with Bay Ridge Parkway and Bay Parkway, placing the road under the jurisdiction of the Brooklyn Parks Department. The renaming was intended to boost the desirability of real estate along its route. The renaming was approved by the governor on May 17, 1892. In contrast to Ocean Parkway and Eastern Parkway, while Fort Hamilton Parkway was paved in late 1896, it was never given the widths or separated lanes of these two better-known Brooklyn parkways. In 1915, responsibility for this road was transferred from Parks to the Brooklyn Borough President. Fort Hamilton Parkway is presently maintained by the New York City Department of Transportation, which maintains all streets in New York City.

== Parks along the route ==
As Fort Hamilton Parkway cuts diagonally through the local street grid, triangular intersections that are too small to be developed were designated as parks, including Bocchino-Dente Memorial Plaza and Lt. William E. Coffey Square. Other parks along its route include Greenwood Playground, Leif Ericson Park, McKinley Park, Kathy Reilly Triangle, Dan Ross Playground, and John J. Carty Park. Fort Hamilton Parkway is also the southeastern border of Green-Wood Cemetery, whose Fort Hamilton gate contains a landmarked cottage building.

== Transportation ==
Along its route, it shares its name with three stations of the New York City Subway:

- The Fort Hamilton Parkway station on the IND Culver Line, is served by the F and G trains.
- The Fort Hamilton Parkway station on the BMT West End Line, is served by the D train.
- The Fort Hamilton Parkway station on the BMT Sea Beach Line, is served by the N and W trains.

Until 1975, there was another station also called Fort Hamilton Parkway on the now-demolished section of the BMT Culver Line.

The following bus routes serve Fort Hamilton Parkway:

- The B16 bus route follows it between 86th Street and either 56th Street (Bay Ridge), or 57th Street (Prospect Park). Where the parkway is one-way northbound, southbound buses use the adjacent 7th Avenue.
- The Brownsville-bound B8 runs from Marine Avenue to 92nd Street.
- From there, the B70 takes over, providing service to Bay Ridge Parkway (Sunset Park) or from Seventh Avenue (Dyker Heights).
- The Bay Ridge-bound S53 and S93 run non-stop from 92nd Street to 86th Street, with the S79 running in the opposite direction towards Staten Island.
- The Manhattan-bound BM1 and BM2 run from the parkway's northern end to Prospect Expressway.
