= BMT Broadway Line =

New York City Subway line

- The N, Q, R, and W trains, which use the Broadway Line through Midtown Manhattan, are colored yellow.

Overview
- Status: Operational
- Owner: City of New York
- Locale: Manhattan, New York City
- Termini: east of Lexington Avenue/59th Street; south of Whitehall Street–South Ferry
- Stations: 16

Service
- Type: Rapid transit line
- System: New York City Subway
- Operator: New York City Transit Authority
- Daily ridership: 445,799

History
- Opened: April 9, 1917; 109 years ago
- Last extension: 1919

Technical
- Character: Underground
- Track gauge: 4 ft 8 1/2 in (1,435 mm) standard gauge
- Electrification: Third rail, 625 V DC
Route map
Express station	Local station	Closed station

The BMT Broadway Line is a rapid transit line of the B Division of the New York City Subway in Manhattan. As of November 2016, it is served by four services, all colored yellow: the N and Q trains on the express tracks and the R and W trains on the local tracks during weekdays (the N and Q trains make local stops during late nights, as do the N and R trains on weekends). The line is often referred to as the "N and R", since those were the only services on the line from 1988 to 2001, when the Manhattan Bridge's southern tracks were closed for rebuilding. The Broadway Line was built to give the Brooklyn Rapid Transit Company (later the Brooklyn–Manhattan Transit Corporation, or BMT) access to Midtown Manhattan.

The line is named for its location under Broadway between Vesey Street and Seventh Avenue/45th Street (Times Square). It also passes under Vesey Street, Whitehall Street, Trinity Place, and Church Street in Lower Manhattan, and Seventh Avenue, 59th Street, and 60th Street in Midtown. The local tracks stretch the entire length between the two East River tunnels: the Montague Street Tunnel to the BMT Fourth Avenue Line in Brooklyn and the 60th Street Tunnel to the BMT Astoria Line and 60th Street Tunnel Connection in Queens. Center express tracks exist between Canal Street and 57th Street, turning off at Canal Street to feed the south tracks on the Manhattan Bridge, and continuing north and east under Central Park as the IND/BMT 63rd Street Line (connecting with the Second Avenue Subway). The Broadway Line was the only Manhattan outlet north of Delancey Street for the BMT's Brooklyn lines until 1967, when the opening of the Chrystie Street Connection allowed most BMT Brighton Line and BMT West End Line service to be moved to the IND Sixth Avenue Line.

== Description and service ==
The following services use the Broadway Line and are colored yellow:

Route		Services					
	Time period	South of Whitehall St	Between Whitehall St and Canal St	Canal St via Bridge	Between Canal St and 42 St	49 St and 57 St	Between 57 St and Lexington Ave
"N" train	Weekdays	no service		express		local	
"N" train	Weekends	no service		local			
"N" train	Nights	local		no service	local		
"Q" train	All times except nights	no service		express			no service (diverges north of 57 St)
"Q" train	Nights	no service		local			no service (diverges north of 57 St)
"R" train	All times except nights	local		no service	local		
"R" train	Nights	local	no service				
"w" train	Weekdays	local rush hours	local	no service	local		

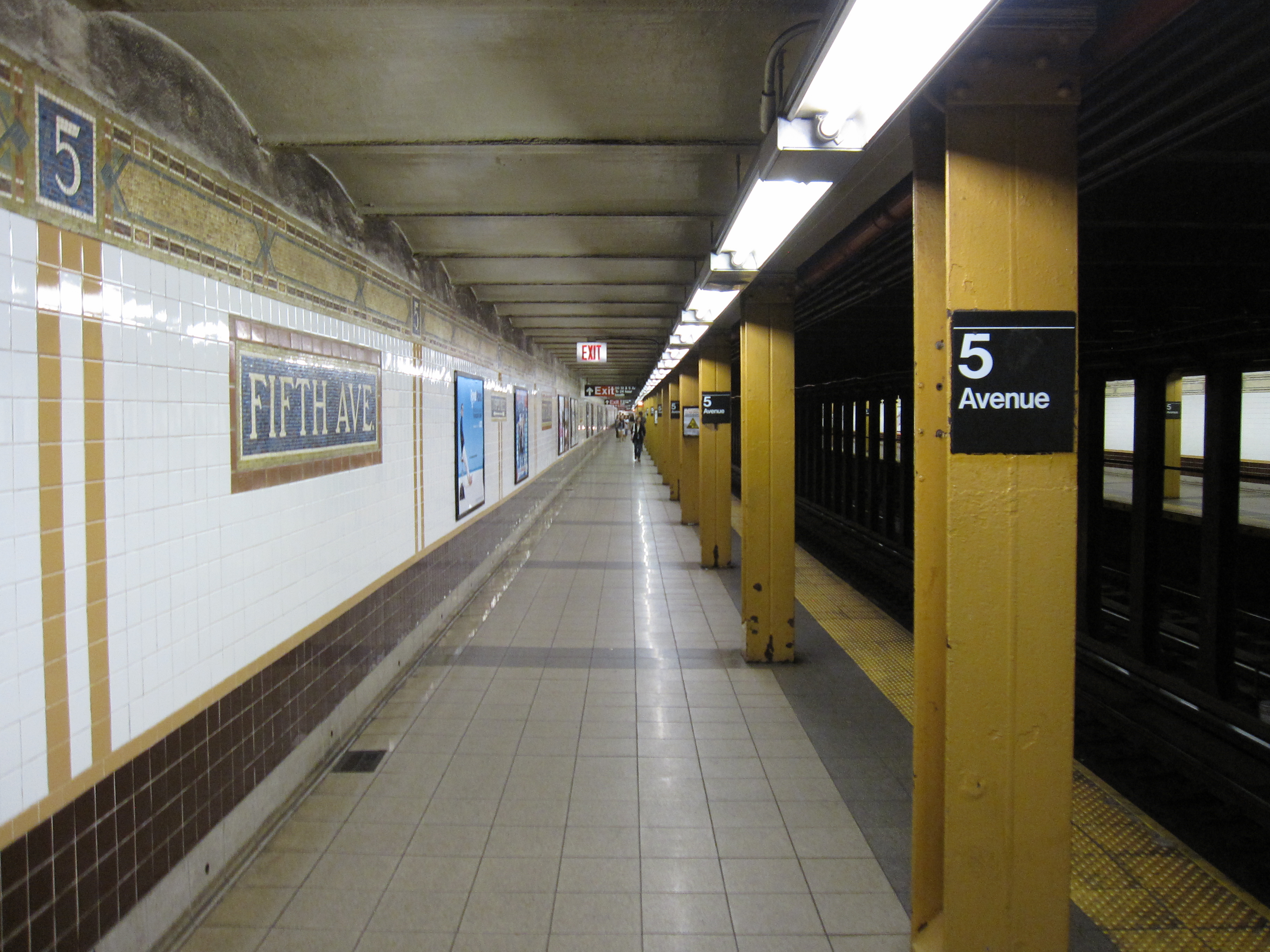
Fifth Avenue–59th Street station

The BMT Broadway Line begins at the 60th Street Tunnel from Queens. The N and W trains from the BMT Astoria Line and the R service from the IND Queens Boulevard Line join at the beginning of the tunnel. The line runs west as a two-track subway line under 60th Street (east of Fifth Avenue) and 59th Street (west of Fifth Avenue), with stations at Lexington Avenue/59th Street and Fifth Avenue/59th Street. It then turns south to Seventh Avenue into the 57th Street–Seventh Avenue station.

At the 57th Street station, the line joins two express tracks that enter the station from the north via the BMT 63rd Street Line, which the Q uses (with rush hour service from the N and R). The line proceeds as a four-track subway down Seventh Avenue to its intersection with Broadway at Times Square-42nd Street, and then continues down Broadway to a point north of Canal Street, where the express tracks carrying the N and Q services descend and turn sharply east to separate platforms from the local tracks, before crossing the south side of the Manhattan Bridge to go to Brooklyn.

Immediately after Canal Street, the express tracks resume again (originally they had been intended to run through) and serve as storage and turning tracks, bypassing the Canal Street local station and ending in the disused lower level of City Hall. The local tracks continue south as a two-track subway to Whitehall Street–South Ferry station. Whitehall Street–South Ferry is a three track, two-platform station, with the center track set up as a terminal track for the W train during weekdays, and late night R trains. The BMT Broadway Line then curves east carrying the R train to a trailing non-revenue connection with the BMT Nassau Street Line (no regular service) and enters the Montague Street Tunnel to Brooklyn.

=== Unused sections and provisions ===
Because of the complicated history, the Broadway Line includes several remnants of earlier plans. The line was built as four tracks south to City Hall, where the local tracks were to terminate on the upper level, and the express tracks were to use the lower level, curving through Vesey Street into Church Street. However, the final plan had the express tracks splitting at Canal Street and passing under the northbound local track to the Manhattan Bridge. The tracks via Canal Street and the Manhattan Bridge were not intended to be connected to the Broadway Line. Instead, they were supposed to be a crosstown line continuing further west. The tracks were connected to the Broadway Line as it allowed through operation between the Broadway Line and the Fourth Avenue Line in Brooklyn to go into operation more than a year earlier than would otherwise have been possible. From the Canal Street Bridge station, it is possible to see where the line would have continued further west to a terminal near the Hudson River. At the Canal Street local station, the express tracks terminate part of the way into the station, more evidence of the change of plans. The tunnel south of City Hall was rebuilt to bring the upper local tracks down to the lower level north of Vesey Street, and the lower level at City Hall was never used for passenger service. The lower level is currently used for train storage.

Unused construction is also present near the west end of the Queensboro Bridge. The original plan there was to build two one-track tunnels under 59th and 60th Streets east of Fifth Avenue, rising onto the bridge to Queens. On July 28, 1915, the New York Public Service Commission approved a change of plans requested by the New York City Board of Estimate to place both tracks under 60th Street and cross the East River in the 60th Street Tunnel, because of concern whether or not the bridge could handle the weight of all-steel subway trains. A piece of the 59th Street tunnel had already been built, concurrent with the construction of the IRT Lexington Avenue Line, and became a walkway connecting the two side platforms of the IRT's 59th Street station.

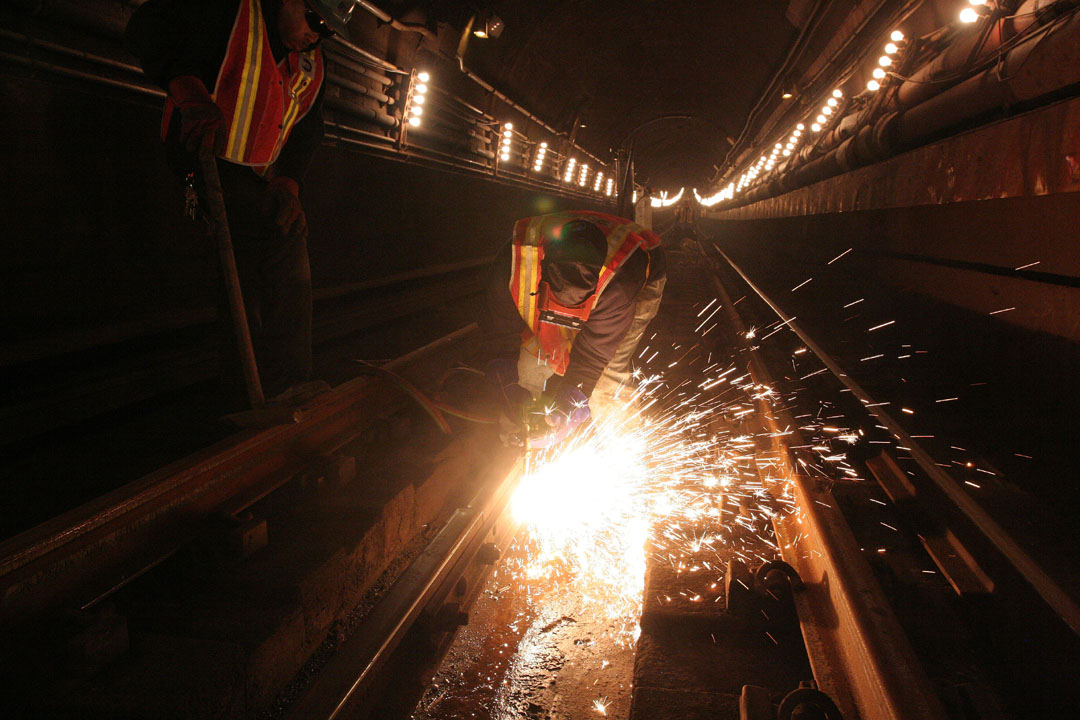
The 60th Street Tunnel getting weekend track work

North of 57th Street, provisions were built to extend the four tracks northwest through Central Park and under Eighth Avenue through the Upper West Side to Inwood, along the route later built as the IND Eighth Avenue Line. The provision existed for many years and would have allowed for a grade-separated junction, allowing Broadway service via 59th Street and Eighth Avenue to coexist. The provisions from two express tracks were connected to the BMT 63rd Street Line in 1989. The provisions from the two local tracks remain unused.

South of the Whitehall Street station, provisions were built to allow for two tunnels to Atlantic Avenue in Brooklyn. It was later proposed to use these provisions as part of the Lower Manhattan–Jamaica/JFK Transportation Project, connecting to the Court Street station (New York Transit Museum) in Brooklyn.

== History ==
=== Planning ===
New York City's first subway line, operated by the Interborough Rapid Transit Company (IRT), ran along Broadway in Lower Manhattan and Upper Manhattan, but it detoured away from Broadway between New York City Hall and Times Square. John B. McDonald, the contractor who built the first subway line, had considered constructing a subway line under part of the remaining portion of Broadway as early as April 1902. The line would have run between Union Square and Times Square, merging with the IRT's subway line north of Times Square. In July 1902, McDonald and the IRT's president August Belmont Jr. unsuccessfully proposed a line under Broadway between Union Square and Times Square for $100,000. The Brooklyn Daily Eagle reported that, if the New York City government had accepted Belmont and McDonald's proposal, the government could lose $150,000 in annual income from the streetcar companies that used Broadway.

The New York Public Service Commission adopted plans for what was known as the Broadway–Lexington Avenue route on December 31, 1907. This route began at the Battery and ran under Greenwich Street, Vesey Street, Broadway to Ninth Street, private property to Irving Place, and Irving Place and Lexington Avenue to the Harlem River. After crossing under the Harlem River into the Bronx, the route split at Park Avenue and 138th Street, with one branch continuing north to and along Jerome Avenue to Woodlawn Cemetery, and the other heading east and northeast along 138th Street, Southern Boulevard, and Westchester Avenue to Pelham Bay Park. In early 1908, the Tri-borough plan was formed, combining this route, the under-construction Centre Street Loop Subway in Manhattan and Fourth Avenue Subway in Brooklyn, a Canal Street subway from the Fourth Avenue Subway via the Manhattan Bridge to the Hudson River, and several other lines in Brooklyn. A list of stations on the Broadway–Lexington Avenue line were announced in 1909. The plans tentatively called for a super-express service with stops at Warren or Murray Street and at Canal Street in Lower Manhattan, running non-stop to 86th Street and 125th Street in Upper Manhattan.

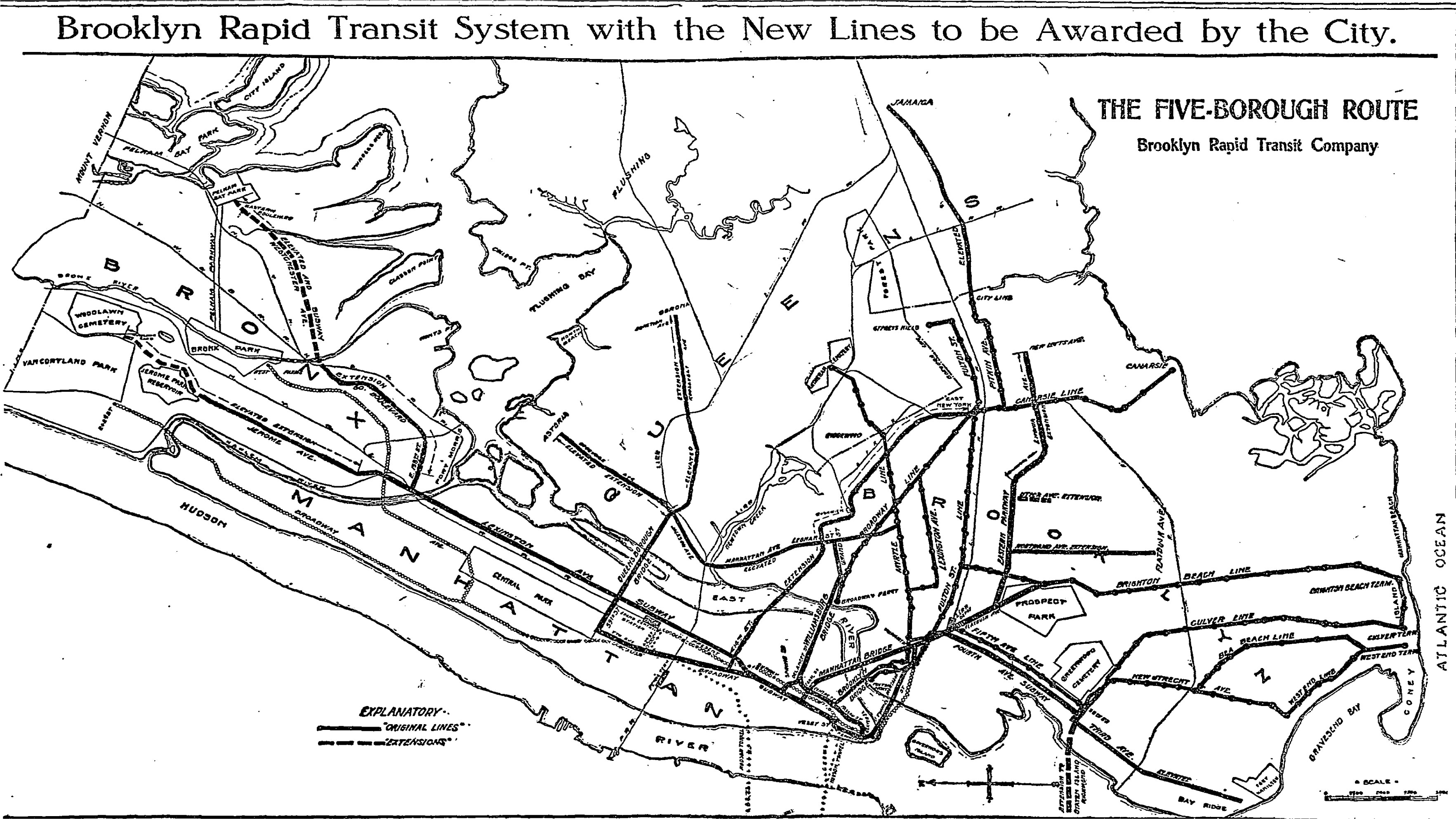
The BRT proposal

The Brooklyn Rapid Transit Company (BRT) submitted a proposal to the Commission, dated March 2, 1911, to operate the Tri-borough system (but under Church Street instead of Greenwich Street), as well as a branch along Broadway, Seventh Avenue, and 59th Street from Ninth Street north and east to the Queensboro Bridge; the Canal Street subway was to merge with the Broadway Line instead of continuing to the Hudson River. The IRT initially opposed the BRT's plans to operate a subway line under Broadway in Manhattan, as the IRT wanted to operate the line itself, but the BRT persisted. In May 1911, the IRT proposed constructing a two-track line extending from Lafayette Avenue in Brooklyn, which would cross the East River into Manhattan and travel west under 14th Street, north under Broadway, and east under 59th Street to the Queensboro Bridge. The BRT refused to accept this offer. The city, the BRT, and the IRT reached an agreement and sent a report to the New York City Board of Estimate on June 5, 1911. The line along Broadway to 59th Street was assigned to the BRT, while the IRT obtained the Lexington Avenue line, connecting with its existing route at Grand Central–42nd Street. The New York City Board of Estimate approved the report on June 21. The Public Service Commission approved a proposal in March 1912 to connect the line with the proposed Montague Street Tunnel at its southern end. The Dual Contracts, two operating contracts between the city and the BMT and IRT, were adopted on March 4, 1913.

Before construction started, the plans for the Broadway Line's stations in midtown were changed several times. Originally, there was going to be an express station at 47th Street, and there would have been local stations at 42nd and 57th Streets. In December 1913, the plans were changed so that both 47th and 57th Streets were express stations, and the local stop at 42nd Street was relocated to 38th Street. Opponents of the plan said it would cause large amounts of confusion, as Times Square was a "natural" transfer point. In February 1914, the PSC ordered the BRT to make the Broadway Line's 42nd Street station an express station. In addition, 57th Street became an express station, while there was to be a local station at 49th Street. The change was made at the insistence of Brooklynites who wanted an express station in the Theater District of Manhattan.

=== Construction ===
==== Work south of 14th Street ====
The first part of the Broadway Line to be built was the section south of 14th Street, which was initially known as the Broadway–Lexington Avenue Line. In January 1912, the Underpinning & Foundation Company received a $2.295 million contract to construct section 3 of the line, from Howard Street to Houston Street, which included the Prince Street station. The same month, the Degnon Construction Company submitted a low bid for the construction of section 2 of the Broadway–Lexington Avenue Line, from Park Place to Walker Street (two blocks south of Howard Street), for $2.356 million; this segment included the City Hall station. The Canal Street station was to be built as part of section 2A, between Walker and Howard Streets, which was placed for bid in March 1912. The O'Rourke Engineering Construction Company submitted a low bid of about $910,000 for section 2A.

In September 1912, F. L. Cranford received about $2 million in construction contracts for sections 1 and 1A in Lower Manhattan. By then, the Public Service Commission had decided to divide the Broadway–Lexington Avenue Line between the BRT and the IRT; as such, the commission canceled plans for sections 5 and 6 of the Broadway–Lexington Avenue Line, which paralleled the existing IRT line. During construction, workers discovered the remnants of a tunnel for the Beach Pneumatic Transit near City Hall, as well as the remains of a 17th-century colonial prison near Dey Street.

In May 1913, the Public Service Commission began receiving bids for section 4 of the Broadway–Lexington Avenue Line, between Houston Street and Union Square, which was to include the Eighth Street and 14th Street stations. This was the first construction contract to be placed for bidding after the Dual Contracts had been signed. The Dock Contractor Company submitted a low bid of $2.578 million, but local civic group Broadway Association and various property owners objected to the fact that Dock Contractor was to receive the contract, citing the firm's lack of experience. The Public Service Commission approved Dock Contractor's bid despite these objections, and the contract was awarded later that month. By the end of the year, work on the tunnel south of 14th Street was running ahead of schedule. Section 3 was 78 percent complete, while section 4 was 71 percent complete. These sections were more than 80 percent complete by March 1914; work on the City Hall station was so far advanced that contractors had begun installing subway entrances.

==== Canal Street spur ====
By February 1914, the Public Service Commission was soliciting bids for a tunnel extending east under Canal Street to the Manhattan Bridge. Due to the swampy character of the area (which used to contain a drainage canal from Collect Pond), the commission considered building the line using either the cut-and-cover method or using deep-bore tunneling. The Underpinning and Foundation Company submitted a low bid of $1.822 million for a cut-and-cover tunnel. The Canal Street tunnel was originally supposed to be a separate line passing under the Broadway Line station and extend further westward. At the time, the Public Service Commission did not plan to build a track connection between the Canal Street and Broadway lines, saying that such a connection would cause severe train congestion. The BRT wanted to connect the lines, citing the fact that it would be difficult for passengers to transfer at the Canal Street station or to reroute trains in case of emergency. East of Centre Street, the Canal Street line had four tracks, although the southern two tracks turned south onto the Centre Street Loop.

Work on the Canal Street line proceeded slowly, in part because of the high water table of the area, which required the contractor to pump out millions of gallons of groundwater every day. Plans for the Canal Street line west of Broadway were abandoned midway during construction, and the Canal Street line was connected to the Broadway Line instead. The Canal Street spur was less than half completed by January 1916 and was not planned to be opened for another fourteen months. By then, the sections of the mainline Broadway Line south of 26th Street were between 88 and 99.7 percent finished. Real-estate figures wanted the completion of the Canal Street spur to be expedited so the Broadway Line could be opened, and they claimed that the city's failure to open the Broadway Line would result in a loss of profit for the BRT.

==== Work north of 14th Street ====
The route north of 14th Street was originally considered a separate line, the Broadway Line, which tied into the Broadway–Lexington Avenue Line south of 14th Street. The Public Service Commission began soliciting bids for section 1 of the Broadway Line from 16th to 26th Streets, which included the 23rd Street station, in July 1913. This segment was awarded to the E. E. Smith Construction Company that September. By early 1914, contracts had been let for all segments from Whitehall Street to 26th Street. The Public Service Commission approved plans for the segment between 26th and 38th Streets, including the 28th Street and 34th Street stations, in April 1914. The contract for that section went to the second-lowest bidder, the United States Realty and Construction Company, as the lowest bidder was too inexperienced. U.S. Realty began constructing the tunnel between 26th and 38th Streets in August 1914.

By the end of 1914, contracts had been awarded for all sections south of 38th Street, but the section north of 38th Street was delayed due to disputes over the layout and placement of the 42nd Street station. In particular, the Public Service Commission was supposed to have awarded a contract for the portion between the intersection of 38th Street and Broadway, and the intersection of 59th Street and Seventh Avenue. No contract for this section of the line had been awarded by early 1915 because plans for the line north of 59th Street were in dispute. The section between 38th Street and 51st Street, known as section 3, was not put to bid until July 1915. This section was to include the Times Square–42nd Street and 49th Street stations. Holbrook, Cabot & Rollins Inc. submitted a low bid of $3.741 million for that section of the line.

==== Completion ====
The Broadway Line was originally supposed to open at the beginning of 1917. However, the line's opening had to be postponed by mid-1915, as none of the connections to other subway lines were close to finished. The Broadway Line south of 14th Street was substantially complete by February 1916. The same month, the Public Service Commission began accepting bids for the installation of finishes at seven stations on the Broadway Line from Rector Street to 14th Street, and D. C. Gerber submitted a $346,000 low bid for the finishes. At the time, work on the section of the line north of 14th Street had not advanced as far as the section to the south, and the BRT blamed the city government for delays in opening the line. By that October, stations between Morris Street (in Lower Manhattan) and 14th Street were 35 percent completed. A. W. King was hired to install finishes in the 34th Street and Times Square stations in July 1917.

The Public Service Commission indicated in February 1917 that it was prepared to force the BRT to open the section of the line between Canal Street and 14th Street, even though the BRT wished to wait until the Times Square station was completed. That year, the IRT and BRT reached an agreement in which the Broadway Line would receive power from the IRT Powerhouse. At the end of August 1917, the BRT's parent company, the New York Consolidated Railroad Company, applied to the Public Service Commission for permission to open the line from Canal Street to 14th Street. The opening of the line was expected to reduce congestion at Chambers Street, where many BRT passengers had previously transferred to the IRT and paid an extra fare to go uptown.

=== Opening ===
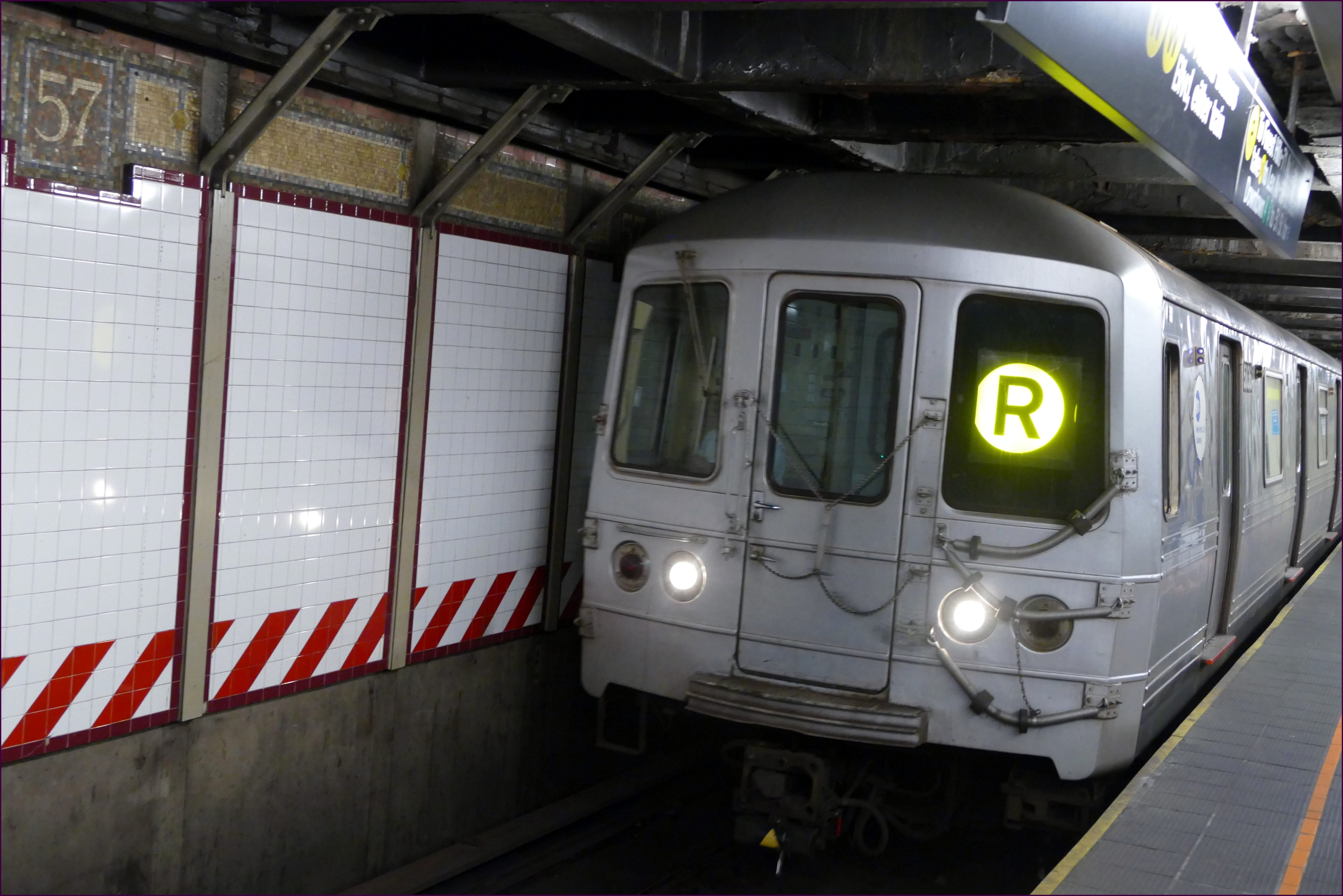
An R train of R46 cars at 57th Street

A short portion of the line, coming off the north side of the Manhattan Bridge through Canal Street to 14th Street–Union Square, opened on September 4, 1917, at 2 P.M., with an eight car train carrying members of the Public Service Commission, representatives of the city government and officials of the BRT, leaving Union Square toward Coney Island. Service opened to the general public at 8 P.M., with trains leaving Union Square and Coney Island simultaneously. The line was served by two services. One route ran via the Fourth Avenue Line and the Sea Beach Line to Coney Island; this service was rerouted from its previous terminus at Chambers Street. The other line ran to Ninth Avenue, where passengers could transfer for West End and Culver Line service. The initial headway on the line was three minutes during rush hours, three minutes and forty-five seconds at other times, except during late nights when service ran every fifteen minutes. The opening of the Broadway Line's first segment caused real-estate prices to increase in parts of Brooklyn which had direct subway access to the new line.

On January 5, 1918, the line was extended north to Times Square–42nd Street and south to Rector Street. Express service via the line began, with Sea Beach and West End trains that had been running local becoming expresses. The opening of this portion of the line provided additional transit service to Times Square, with a new connection to Brooklyn. Local service henceforth ran between Times Square and Rector Street. While local trains terminated at the Times Square station, express trains from Brooklyn continued to terminate at Union Square until the northward extension to 57th Street was completed. At the beginning of September 1918, trains on the line were lengthened from four to five cars. Service was extended one station to Whitehall Street–South Ferry on September 20, 1918.

The line was extended two stops northward to 57th Street on July 10, 1919. Express service between Times Square and Union Square was inaugurated on this date. Previously, express service terminated at Union Square, with local service terminating at Times Square. Express service then began to terminate at Times Square, with local service terminating at the new 57th Street station. Express service between Manhattan and Pacific Street began to run at all times except late nights. The line was extended to Lexington Avenue/59th Street on September 1, 1919.

On August 1, 1920, the Broadway Line was extended on either end, with the opening of two tunnels under the East River. On the north end the line was extended through the 60th Street Tunnel to Queensboro Plaza, and on the south end the line was extended through the Montague Street Tunnel to DeKalb Avenue with service via the BMT Brighton Line. With these extensions, the Broadway Line was completed.

=== Station modifications ===
Platforms at stations on the Broadway Line originally could only fit six 67-foot-long (20 m) cars. The State Transit Commission first directed the BMT to lengthen platforms at these stations in September 1923, but the BMT declined to do so, citing workforce shortages. In 1926, the New York City Board of Transportation (BOT) received bids for the lengthening of platforms at nine stations on the Broadway Line, from Whitehall Street to 23rd Street, to accommodate eight-car trains. Edwards & Flood submitted a low bid of $101,750 for the project. The platform-lengthening project was completed in 1927, bringing the length of these stations' platforms to 535 feet (163 m).

In the 1960s, the New York City Transit Authority (NYCTA) started a project to lengthen station platforms on the Broadway Line to 615 feet (187 m) to accommodate 10-car trains. All stations on the Broadway Line had their platforms lengthened during this time. The NYCTA also covered elaborate mosaic tile walls with 8-by-16-inch (20 by 41 cm) white cinderblock tiles at 16 local stations on the Broadway and Fourth Avenue lines. The latter project was criticized for being dehumanizing. An NYCTA spokesman stated that the old tiles were in poor condition and that the change was made to improve the appearance of stations and provide uniformity. Furthermore, it did not consider the old mosaics to have "any great artistic merit".

=== Chrystie Street Connection reconfiguration ===
The Chrystie Street Connection was built during the 1960s. The new connection consisted of a pair of double-track tunnels connecting the IND Sixth Avenue Line south of the Broadway–Lafayette Street station with the Williamsburg Bridge and the Manhattan Bridge north tracks. The Broadway Line had previously been connected to the north tracks of the Manhattan Bridge. As part of the project, the Broadway Line was connected to the south tracks, which had been previously used by trains from the BMT Nassau Street Line. The connection between the south tracks and the Nassau Street Line was severed, and the connection between the Broadway Line and the north tracks was also severed. Many routes, including those on the Broadway Line, changed as a result of the opening of the connection on November 26, 1967. The RR local was rerouted to Astoria, running 24/7 between Ditmars Boulevard and Bay Ridge–95th Street. To replace it in Queens, a new EE local was created, running between Forest Hills and Whitehall Street during weekdays. The Q, which was the only service via the Brighton Line, was converted to the rush-hour only QB, running express in Manhattan from 57th Street. Most of the trips were moved to the IND Sixth Avenue Line as a relocated D, but a few trips stayed as the QB. QT service was discontinued. Another rush-hours only express service, the NX, was created. It ran from 57th Street to Brighton Beach, following the N route, making express stops along the BMT Sea Beach Line, before going through Coney Island to terminate at Brighton Beach. NX service ended on April 12, 1968 due to low ridership.

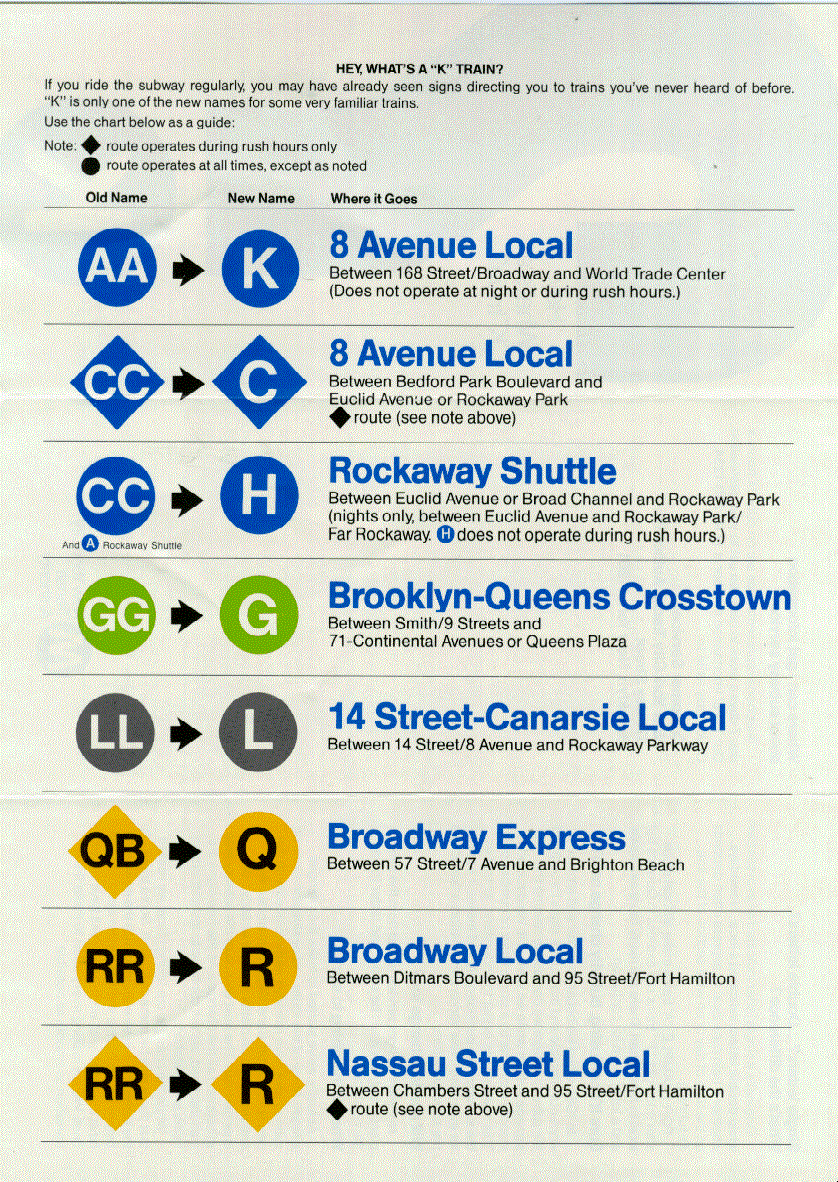
Brochure showing the elimination of double letters

At most times, the Broadway Line has had four services — two local and two express — during the day, with a third express service until the 1967 opening of the Chrystie Street Connection.

- 1/QT (BMT Brighton Line) local trains ran until 1967, when the QT was discontinued. At that time, the EE was introduced, becoming part of the N in 1976; the N became express and the W became local in 2004.
- 1/Q (BMT Brighton Line) express trains were mostly moved to the IND Sixth Avenue Line as a relocated D in 1967, but a few trips stayed as the QB, later the Q again. During the Manhattan Bridge reconstruction, from the 1980s until 2001, the Q mostly used the IND Sixth Avenue Line. When restored in 2001, the Q became full-time, replacing the D on the Brighton Line.
- 2/RR (BMT Fourth Avenue Line) trains (later R) have run local over the Broadway Line since 1920.
- 3/T (BMT West End Line) trains ran express on the Broadway Line until 1967, when the T became part of the realigned B via the IND Sixth Avenue Line.
- 4/N (BMT Sea Beach Line) trains used the express tracks until the Manhattan Bridge reconstruction in the 1980s, when all N trips became local. (Some had run local since the EE was merged into the N in 1976.) When the Manhattan Bridge south tracks reopened in 2001, the W was introduced, at first running express; it became local in 2004, and the N moved back to the express tracks.

Several other services have used the express tracks, including the NX (Sea Beach, 1967–1968) and the B (West End) and D (Brighton) during closures of the Manhattan Bridge north tracks in the 1980s and 1990s.

On May 6, 1985, double letters were eliminated, and the QB was relabeled the Q, and the RR was relabeled the R.

=== Manhattan Bridge reconstruction: 1986–2001 ===
On April 26, 1986, the north side tracks on the Manhattan Bridge leading to the IND Sixth Avenue Line were closed for rehabilitation, and services that had used the north side were moved to the south side, running via the BMT Broadway Line. Because of the large amount of train traffic now running on the bridge's south side tracks, rush hour and midday N service stopped using the bridge, and began running via the Montague Street Tunnel and Lower Manhattan making local stops. However, evening, night and weekend trains continued to use the bridge and express tracks, terminating at 57th Street–Seventh Avenue. B and D services were split. Their service from the Bronx and Upper Manhattan continued to run via the Sixth Avenue Line, terminating at 34th Street. Their service to Brooklyn, however, was rerouted via the Broadway Line express tracks. D service terminated at 57th Street, while B service terminated at Astoria-Ditmars Boulevard during rush hours, and at Queensboro Plaza during middays, evenings, and weekends.

Between April 26, 1986 and May 24, 1987, the N ran express via the Bridge to 57th Street during evenings, nights, and weekends. Afterwards, N service began running local via the Broadway Line during evenings, nights, and weekends, but they still operated over the Manhattan Bridge. On May 24, 1987, when the N and R swapped routes in Queens, there were additional changes in Broadway service. Evening and weekend B service stopped switching to the local track north of 34th Street to serve the Astoria Line. Instead, it skipped 49th Street and terminated at 57th Street.

When the north side of the Manhattan Bridge reopened on December 11, 1988, the south side of the bridge was closed. B, D, and Q trains were rerouted from the Broadway Line to the Sixth Avenue Line using the north side of the bridge. The N began running local in Manhattan and via the Montague Tunnel at all times. In order to replace B service to Ditmars Boulevard, additional N service was provided during rush hours.

On September 30, 1990, express service on the Broadway Line was restored when repair work on the Manhattan Bridge was temporarily suspended. The N then began making express stops from 34th Street to Canal Street at all times except late nights. R service between Manhattan and Brooklyn was increased during rush hours. During late nights, R trains no longer ran via the Broadway Line; instead, they operated as a shuttle in Brooklyn, terminating at 36th Street. The brief Broadway service via the Manhattan Bridge was stopped on December 27 because of a cracked beam on the bridge.

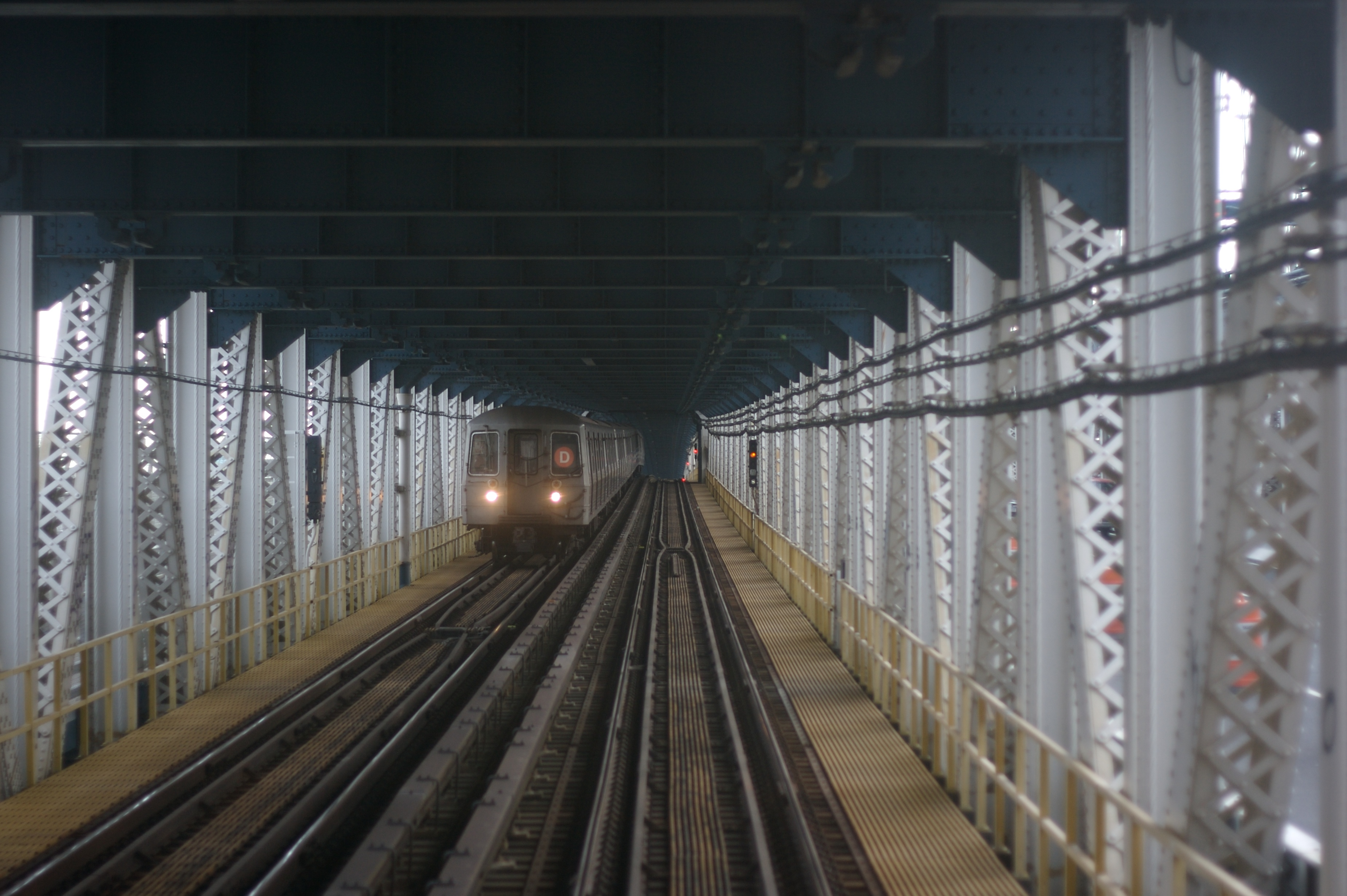
A D train on the north side of the Manhattan Bridge, looking toward Brooklyn

From April 30, 1995 to November 12, 1995, the Manhattan Bridge services were supposed to go back to the 1986–1988 service pattern with only the south side Broadway Line tracks in service. However, the Broadway side was not yet ready. As a result, during middays and weekends, the north side of the bridge was also closed. As a result, Q trains began serving the Broadway Line again. They ran via the Montague Street Tunnel, before switching to the express tracks after Canal Street. This service continued past 57th Street via the BMT 63rd Street Line to 21st Street–Queensbridge, being the first scheduled service to use this connection.

On February 22, 1998, construction on the IND 63rd Street Line cut B and Q service to 57th Street–Sixth Avenue. Service on the 63rd Street Line was replaced by a shuttle running from the BMT Broadway Line. Trains originally operated from 57th Street–Seventh Avenue to 21st Street–Queensbridge, with 20-minute headways. On April 6, 1998, because the service did not terminate at an ADA-accessible station, the shuttle was extended to 34th Street–Herald Square on weekdays, skipping 49th Street via the express tracks. Normal service resumed on May 22, 1999.

=== 2001–present ===
The current set of four services — N, Q, R, and W — started using the line on July 22, 2001, when the south tracks on the Manhattan Bridge reopened and the Broadway B and D services were discontinued. At this time, the north-side tracks were closed. Originally, the N ran local via the Montague Street Tunnel and the BMT Sea Beach Line, and the W ran express via the Manhattan Bridge and the BMT West End Line. On February 22, 2004, when the north tracks reopened, the N became express via the Manhattan Bridge and the W was short-turned at Whitehall Street, its Brooklyn section being replaced by the D.

On June 25, 2010, because of a budget shortfall, service on the Broadway Line was reduced. The W train was discontinued and was replaced by N and Q service in Manhattan and Queens, respectively. The N train, which replaced the W, began running local north of Canal Street at all times, and the Q train was extended to/from Astoria, Queens via the 60th Street Tunnel in place of the W on weekdays, stopping on the local tracks starting at Times Square–42nd Street. In December 2014, the Q began running local on the line between Canal Street and 57th Street–Seventh Avenue during late nights, to supplement late-night N service.

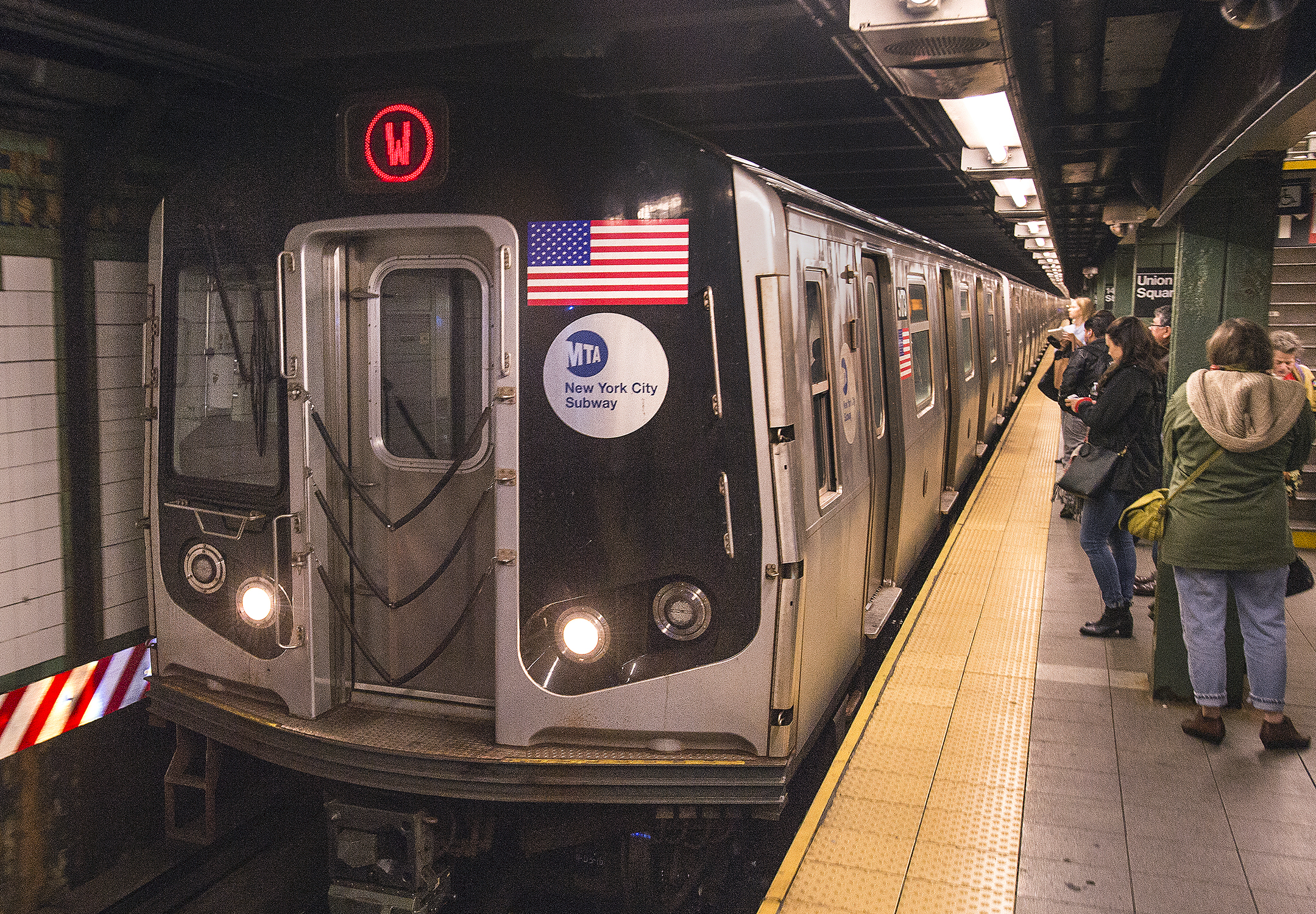
A W train of R160 cars at Union Square

In early 2016, as part of the upcoming opening of the Second Avenue Subway's first phase, the MTA announced that the W service would resume operations. On November 5, 2016, late-night R service was extended to Whitehall Street in order to reduce the need to transfer and provide a direct link to Manhattan. Two days later, W trains were reintroduced, running local on weekdays between Ditmars Boulevard and Whitehall Street. The N train once again became a weekday express in Manhattan between 34th Street–Herald Square and Canal Street. Q trains terminated at 57th Street–Seventh Avenue at all times until the first phase of the Second Avenue Subway opened on January 1, 2017, at which point the Q was extended along the Second Avenue Subway north of 57th Street.

In 2024, as part of a program to upgrade the signaling of the New York City Subway, the MTA proposed installing communications-based train control (CBTC) on the Broadway Line and Manhattan Bridge spur as part of its 2025–2029 Capital Program.

== Station listing ==
Station service legend
Stops all times	Stops 24 hours a day
Stops all times except late nights	Stops every day during daytime hours only
Stops late nights only	Stops every day during overnight hours only
Stops late nights and weekends	Stops everyday during overnight hours and weekends during daytime hours only
Stops weekdays during the day	Stops during weekday daytime hours only
Stops rush hours only	Stops during weekday rush hours only
Stops rush hours in the peak direction only	Stops during weekday rush hours in the peak direction only
Time period details
Disabled access	Station is compliant with the Americans with Disabilities Act
↑	Station is compliant with the Americans with Disabilities Act in the indicated direction only
↓	Station is compliant with the Americans with Disabilities Act in the indicated direction only
	Elevator access to mezzanine only

Neighborhood (approximate)	Disabled access	Station	Tracks	Services	Opened	Transfers and notes
begins as a merge of the BMT Astoria Line (N W ) and the 60th Street Tunnel Connection (R ) and passes through the 60th Street Tunnel
Midtown Manhattan		Lexington Avenue–59th Street	local	N R W	September 1, 1919	IRT Lexington Avenue Line (4 5 6 <6> ) Out-of-system transfer with MetroCard/OMNY: 63rd Street Lines (F M N Q R ) at Lexington Avenue–63rd Street; Roosevelt Island Tramway
Midtown Manhattan		Fifth Avenue/59th Street	local	N R W	September 1, 1919	
Midtown Manhattan	express tracks begin from the BMT 63rd Street Line (N Q R )					
Midtown Manhattan	Disabled access	57th Street–Seventh Avenue	all	N Q R W	July 10, 1919	
Midtown Manhattan	↑	49th Street	local	N Q R W	July 10, 1919	Accessible northbound only
Midtown Manhattan	Disabled access	Times Square–42nd Street	all	N Q R W	January 5, 1918	IRT Broadway–Seventh Avenue Line (1 2 3 ) IRT Flushing Line (7 <7>); 42nd Street Shuttle (S ) IND Eighth Avenue Line (A C E ) at 42nd Street–Port Authority Bus Terminal; IND Sixth Avenue Line (B D F <F> M ) at 42nd Street–Bryant Park, daytime only Port Authority Bus Terminal
Midtown Manhattan	Disabled access	34th Street–Herald Square	all	N Q R W	January 5, 1918	IND Sixth Avenue Line (B D F <F> M ) Penn Station: Amtrak, Long Island Rail Road, and New Jersey Transit; M34/M34A Select Bus Service; Connection to PATH at 33rd Street
NoMad		28th Street	local	N Q R W	January 5, 1918	
Flatiron District		23rd Street	local	N Q R W	January 5, 1918	M23 Select Bus Service
Union Square	Disabled access	14th Street–Union Square	all	N Q R W	September 4, 1917	IRT Lexington Avenue Line (4 5 6 <6> ) BMT Canarsie Line (L ) M14A / M14D Select Bus Service
Greenwich Village		Eighth Street–New York University	local	N Q R W	September 4, 1917	
SoHo		Prince Street	local	N Q R W	September 4, 1917	
Chinatown	Elevator access to mezzanine only	Canal Street	express (lower level)	N Q	September 4, 1917	IRT Lexington Avenue Line (4 6 <6> ) BMT Nassau Street Line (J Z ) Express station originally known as Broadway
Chinatown	Elevator access to mezzanine only	Canal Street	local (upper level)	N R W	January 5, 1918	IRT Lexington Avenue Line (4 6 <6> ) BMT Nassau Street Line (J Z ) Express station originally known as Broadway
express tracks continue into Brooklyn via Manhattan Bridge south tracks (N Q )
Civic Center		City Hall	local	N R W	January 5, 1918	
Financial District	Disabled access	Cortlandt Street	local	N R W	January 5, 1918	IRT Broadway–Seventh Avenue Line (2 3 ) at Park Place; IND Eighth Avenue Line (A C ) at Chambers Street; IND Eighth Avenue Line (E ) at World Trade Center; Connection to PATH at World Trade Center
Financial District		Rector Street	local	N R W	January 5, 1918	
Financial District	Elevator access to mezzanine only	Whitehall Street–South Ferry	all	N R W	September 20, 1918	IRT Broadway–Seventh Avenue Line (1 ) M15 Select Bus Service; Staten Island Ferry at South Ferry; Southern terminal for W service
merges with BMT Nassau Street Line (no regular service)
continues into Brooklyn via the Montague Street Tunnel and becomes the BMT Fourth Avenue Line (N R W )
