= 13th Avenue station (BMT Culver Line) =

13 Avenue
- Former New York City Subway station
- View of the former station heading west from Ditmas Avenue

Station statistics
- Address: 37th Street & 13th Avenue; Brooklyn, NY
- Borough: Brooklyn
- Locale: Borough Park
- Coordinates: 40°38′28.5″N 73°59′4.08″W
- Division: B (BMT)
- Services: BMT Culver Line
- Transit: Church Avenue Line
- Structure: Elevated
- Platforms: 2 side platforms
- Tracks: 3

Other information
- Opened: March 16, 1919 (107 years ago)
- Closed: May 11, 1975 (51 years ago)

Station succession
- Next north: Fort Hamilton Parkway
- Next south: Ditmas Avenue
Location

Street map
Station service legend
Symbol	Description
Stops all times	Stops in station at all times
Stops all times except late nights	Stops all times except late nights
Stops late nights only	Stops late nights only
Stops late nights and weekends	Stops late nights and weekends only
Stops weekdays during the day	Stops weekdays during the day
Stops weekends during the day	Stops weekends during the day
Stops all times except rush hours in the peak direction	Stops all times except rush hours in the peak direction
Stops all times except weekdays in the peak direction	Stops all times except weekdays in the peak direction
Stops daily except rush hours in the peak direction	Stops all times except nights and rush hours in the peak direction
Stops rush hours only	Stops rush hours only
Stops rush hours in the peak direction only	Stops rush hours in the peak direction only
Station closed	Station is closed
(Details about time periods)

The 13th Avenue station was a New York City Subway station on the demolished section of the BMT Culver Line. This station was located at the intersection of 37th Street and 13th Avenue in Brooklyn.

== History ==
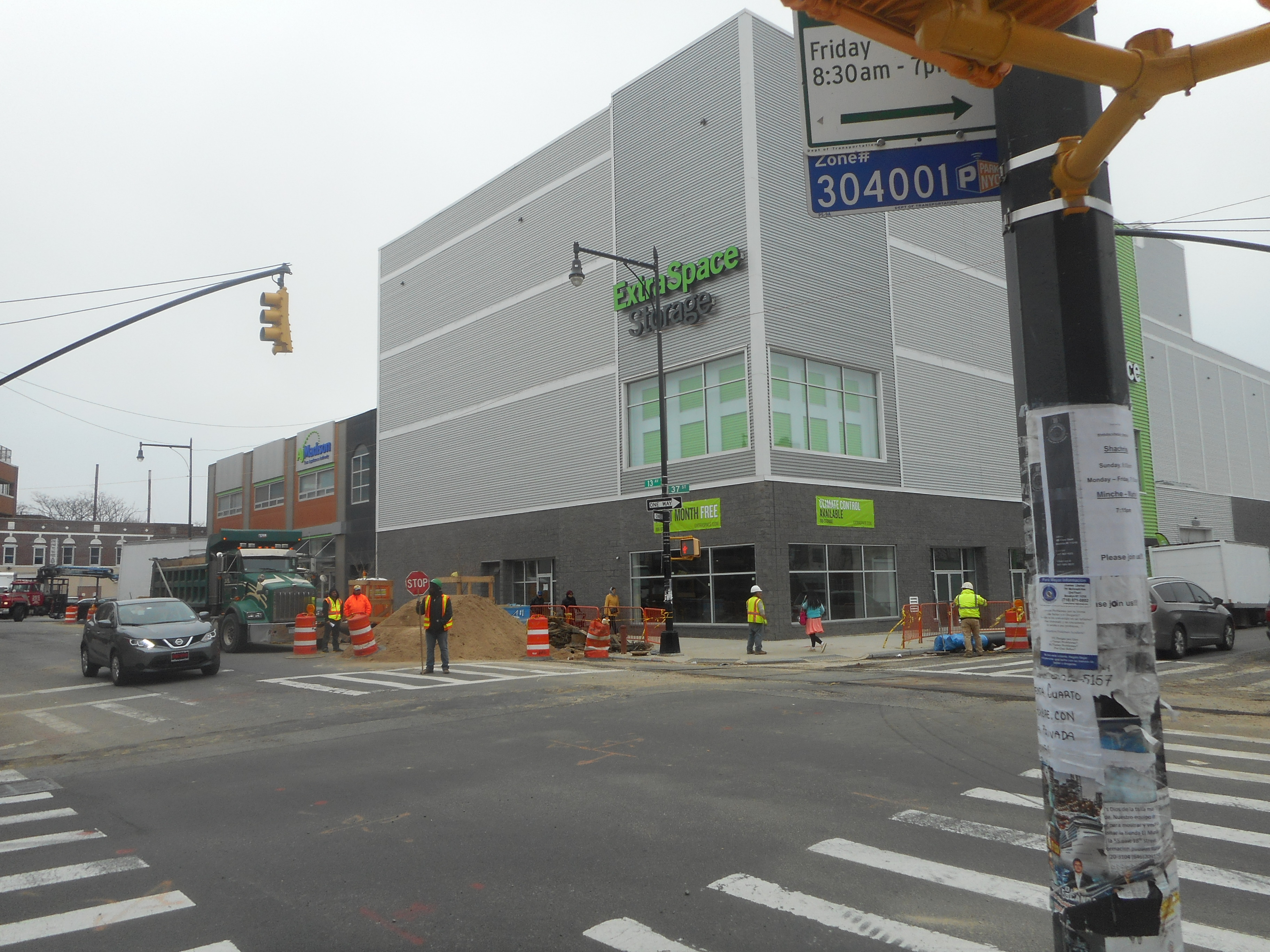
Location of the former site as of 2019

This station opened on March 16, 1919, and had a connection to the B&QT Church Avenue Line streetcar. When the IND South Brooklyn Line was extended to Ditmas Avenue and converted most of the line to the Independent Subway System, the station's service was replaced by the Culver Shuttle.

On May 28, 1959, the station and the line were reduced from three tracks to two. By December 1960, the shuttle was reduced to a single track and platform due to the December 1960 nor'easter and low ridership. The station finally closed on May 11, 1975. The line was demolished in the 1980s.

== Station layout ==
This elevated station originally had three tracks and two side platforms, although, near the end of its life, only used one track and one of the side platforms, due to the removal of the other two tracks.
