= Simone Bocchino =

- Also known as: Aki Bergen, Neuroxyde, DJ Satomi
- Born: September 18, 1978 (age 47); Perugia, Italy
- Genres: Electronica, Dance
- Years active: 1997–present
- Labels: Universal, Sony Music

Simone Bocchino (born 18 September 1978), also known by his stagenames DJ Satomi, Neuroxyde, and Aki Bergen, is an Italian sound engineer, composer and producer, who at age 14 used his passion for the European techno movement as inspiration to start exploring the international club scene.

== Career ==
Bocchino started off within his local music scene and in 1997 met Andrea Prezioso, who became his “precious” mentor for a few years and helped instigate Bocchino's first production. In that year, he and Prezioso wrote a single, Simon Templar - Electricity. In 2002 he opened his first professional studio. In 2003, he signed with Ipnotika Records and the next year wrote Castle in the Sky. This song was highly successful and has been included in many compilations. He later produced the singles Waves and Nuclear Sun. In 2007 he won a 'Gold Disk' in France and shortly afterwards, Starlight Music was launched, featuring collaborations with artists such as Shara Nelson from Massive Attack, D.O.N.S. and Dubfire.

Bocchino's next step was to launch a new label, Neurotraxx. Bocchino collaborated with artists including Dannii Minogue, Ralphi Rosario, Oscar G, Miguel Migs, Goldfish, Noir, Rah Band, Honey Dijon, and Moonbeam. Bocchino also extended himself by giving lessons/lectures on mixing and post-production at universities and several other renowned musical schools. In 2014 he undertook a string of new projects alongside Steyoyoke Recordings in the pipeline.

Simone's debut single, "Castle in the Sky", has been viewed over 26 million times on YouTube since it was uploaded on 2 December 2007.

== Discography ==
=== Compilation albums ===
Year	Album details	Song No.	Song name	Length
2008	Greatest Hits: Released: 14 November 2008; Label: Sunflower Records, Ipnotika; Format: CD, digital download	1	Be A Man	4:25
2008	Greatest Hits: Released: 14 November 2008; Label: Sunflower Records, Ipnotika; Format: CD, digital download	2	Castle In The Sky	4:00
2008	Greatest Hits: Released: 14 November 2008; Label: Sunflower Records, Ipnotika; Format: CD, digital download	3	Dragostea Din Tei	3:58
2008	Greatest Hits: Released: 14 November 2008; Label: Sunflower Records, Ipnotika; Format: CD, digital download	4	Hung Up	4:01
2008	Greatest Hits: Released: 14 November 2008; Label: Sunflower Records, Ipnotika; Format: CD, digital download	5	Little Chance	3:26
2008	Greatest Hits: Released: 14 November 2008; Label: Sunflower Records, Ipnotika; Format: CD, digital download	6	Lost In Space	3:55
2008	Greatest Hits: Released: 14 November 2008; Label: Sunflower Records, Ipnotika; Format: CD, digital download	7	Nuclear Sun	4:21
2008	Greatest Hits: Released: 14 November 2008; Label: Sunflower Records, Ipnotika; Format: CD, digital download	8	The Fall Of Angels	4:10
2008	Greatest Hits: Released: 14 November 2008; Label: Sunflower Records, Ipnotika; Format: CD, digital download	9	Waves	3:40
2008	Greatest Hits: Released: 14 November 2008; Label: Sunflower Records, Ipnotika; Format: CD, digital download	10	With You	4:18
2008	Greatest Hits: Released: 14 November 2008; Label: Sunflower Records, Ipnotika; Format: CD, digital download	11	Castle In The Sky (DJ Marton remix)	3:45
2008	Greatest Hits: Released: 14 November 2008; Label: Sunflower Records, Ipnotika; Format: CD, digital download	12	Wonder (DJ Satomi remix)	3:56
2008	Greatest Hits: Released: 14 November 2008; Label: Sunflower Records, Ipnotika; Format: CD, digital download	13	Superstar (DJ Satomi remix)	3:34
2008	Greatest Hits: Released: 14 November 2008; Label: Sunflower Records, Ipnotika; Format: CD, digital download	14	Stop Loving You (DJ Satomi remix)	3:08
2008	Greatest Hits: Released: 14 November 2008; Label: Sunflower Records, Ipnotika; Format: CD, digital download	15	Fly To Heaven (DJ Satomi remix)	3:35
2008	Greatest Hits: Released: 14 November 2008; Label: Sunflower Records, Ipnotika; Format: CD, digital download	16	By My Side (DJ Satomi remix)	5:29
2008	Greatest Hits: Released: 14 November 2008; Label: Sunflower Records, Ipnotika; Format: CD, digital download	17	Tomorrow (DJ Satomi remix)	5:05
2008	Greatest Hits: Released: 14 November 2008; Label: Sunflower Records, Ipnotika; Format: CD, digital download	18	Wake Up (DJ Satomi remix	3:29
2008	Greatest Hits: Released: 14 November 2008; Label: Sunflower Records, Ipnotika; Format: CD, digital download	19	Right Or Wrong (DJ Satomi remix)	3:13
2008	Greatest Hits: Released: 14 November 2008; Label: Sunflower Records, Ipnotika; Format: CD, digital download	20	TU (DJ Satomi remix)	4:12
