= W (New York City Subway service) =

Rapid transit service

- Broadway Local

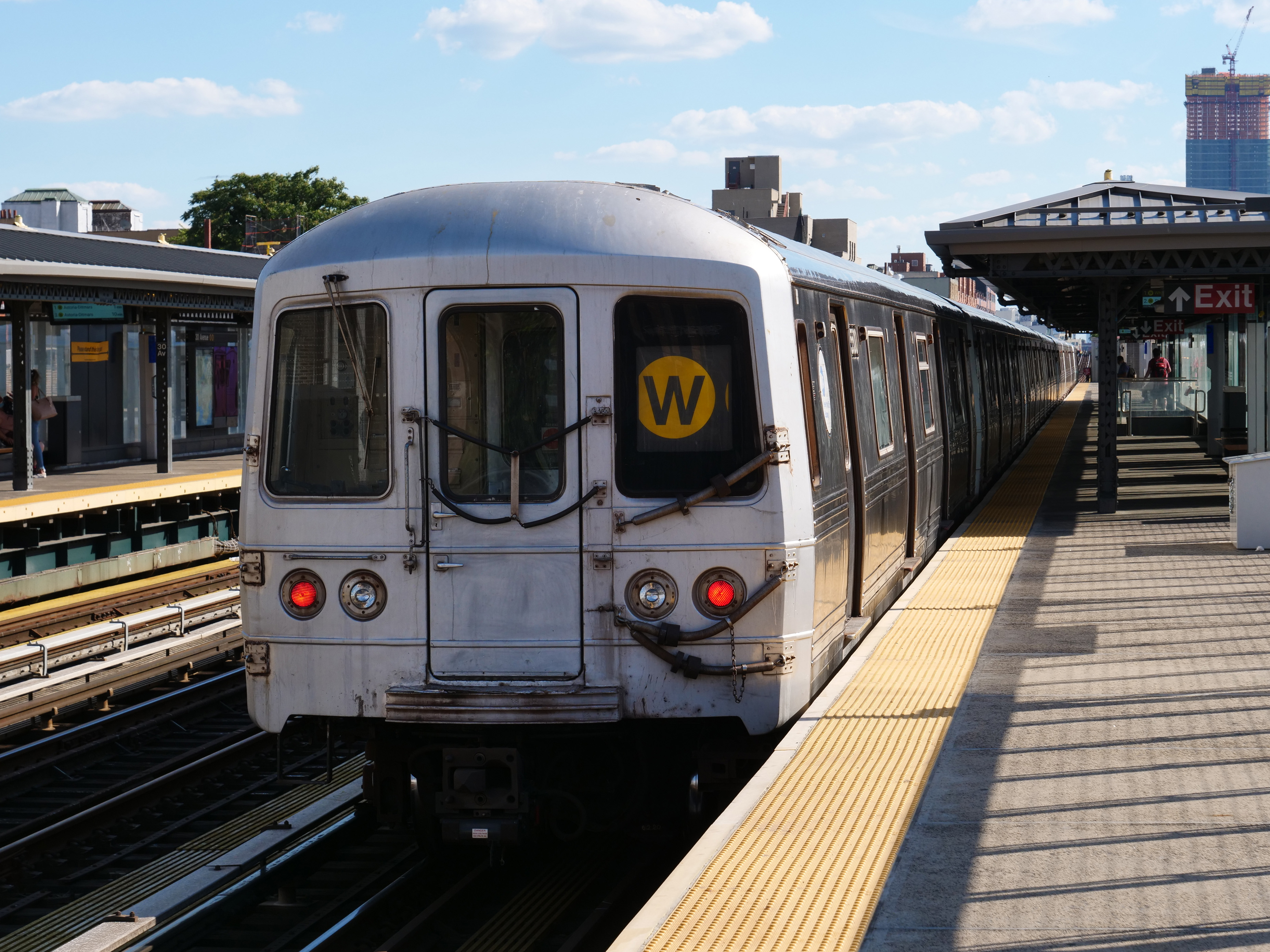
- A Whitehall Street-bound W train of R46s leaving 30th Avenue

- Note: Dashed pink line shows limited rush hour service to/from Gravesend–86th Street.
- Northern end: Astoria–Ditmars Boulevard
- Southern end: Whitehall Street–South Ferry; 86th Street (limited rush hour service); Bay Parkway (limited AM rush hour service in the southbound direction only)
- Stations: 23; 44 (limited service to 86th Street); 32 (limited service to Bay Parkway)
- Rolling stock: R46; R68; R68A (fleet shared with the) (Rolling stock assignments subject to change)
- Depot: Coney Island Yard
- Started service: July 22, 2001; 25 years ago
- Discontinued: June 25, 2010; 16 years ago
- Reinstated: November 7, 2016; 10 years ago

The W Broadway Local is a rapid transit service of the New York City Subway's B Division. Its route emblem, or "bullet", is colored yellow since it uses the BMT Broadway Line in Manhattan.

The W operates weekdays during daytime hours only between Ditmars Boulevard in Astoria, Queens and Whitehall Street in Lower Manhattan, making all stops along the full route; limited rush hour service is extended beyond Whitehall Street to and from Bay Parkway in Bensonhurst, Brooklyn, or 86th Street in Gravesend, Brooklyn. (Note: Limited rush hour service to Manhattan and Queens originates at 86th Street during AM and PM rush hours, but service from Queens and Manhattan terminates at Bay Parkway during AM rush hours and at 86th Street during PM rush hours.) The W is internally staffed and scheduled as part of the N.

Introduced on July 22, 2001, the W originally ran at all times on the BMT West End Line and BMT Fourth Avenue Line in Brooklyn to Coney Island–Stillwell Avenue across the Manhattan Bridge, running express on the Broadway Line. It was truncated in 2004 to its current service pattern, running local on the Broadway Line to Whitehall Street until June 25, 2010, when it was eliminated due to the Metropolitan Transportation Authority (MTA)'s financial crisis. The route was later restored on November 7, 2016, using its original emblem and 2004–2010 routing, as part of the updated service pattern related to the opening of the Second Avenue Subway.

== Service history ==
=== Context ===
The W was originally devised as an extra Broadway service designation. This service was essentially a variant of the N route, which in the 1970s and 1980s made express stops on the Broadway Line between Forest Hills–71st Avenue in Queens and Coney Island–Stillwell Avenue in Brooklyn. At the time, some N trains (until 1976 designated as EE) were designated with a diamond N bullet as early as 1982 on trains, but beginning in 1979 on maps; these trains made all stops on the Broadway Line, and traveled only between 71st Avenue and Whitehall Street. It appeared as a diamond bullet on rollsign blinds ordered for the then-new R68, R68A and R110B subway cars which entered service between 1986 and 1993, as well as on replacement rollsign curtains ordered for the R30 through R46 B Division subway cars overhauled between 1985 and 1992.

The Manhattan Bridge, between Manhattan and Brooklyn, contains four subway tracks: a northern pair for the IND Sixth Avenue Line and a southern pair for the BMT Broadway Line. Repairs to the bridge forced the N, which normally ran express on the Broadway Line and via the bridge, to run local via the Montague Street Tunnel starting in 1986. The south tracks were closed completely for repairs from 1988 to 2001. This service change precluded W local service from running as envisioned.

The W label was first used in 2001, when the two tracks on the Manhattan Bridge's northern side, which connected to the IND Sixth Avenue Line, were closed for repairs; new rollsign curtains were ordered in 2001 to reflect the service changes being implemented at the time, with the W appearing on rollsigns as a circle bullet. This required the suspension of Sixth Avenue B service south of 34th Street–Herald Square as it used those tracks to travel to and from Brooklyn. The W service replaced the B on the BMT West End Line and BMT Fourth Avenue Line in Brooklyn, ran on the BMT Broadway Line in Manhattan and BMT Astoria Line in Queens. It replicated the route of the Brooklyn-Manhattan Transit Corporation (BMT)'s old 3 route (later named the T) that operated from 1916 until 1967, when the B replaced it. The W also replicated the route of the Broadway B service from April 1986 to December 1988 when the bridge's north tracks were first closed.

=== 2001–2004 ===
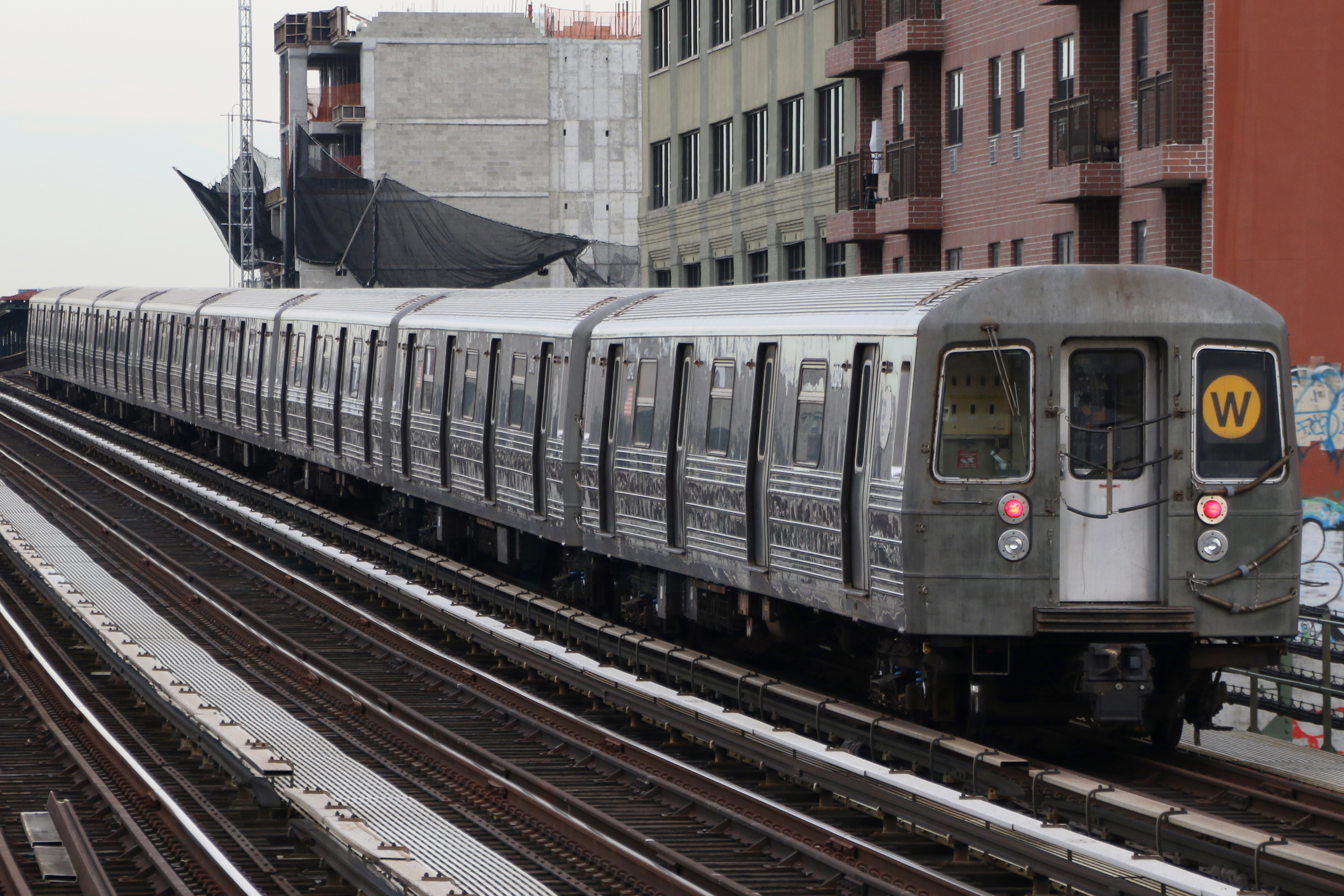
A W train of R68s leaving 39th Avenue

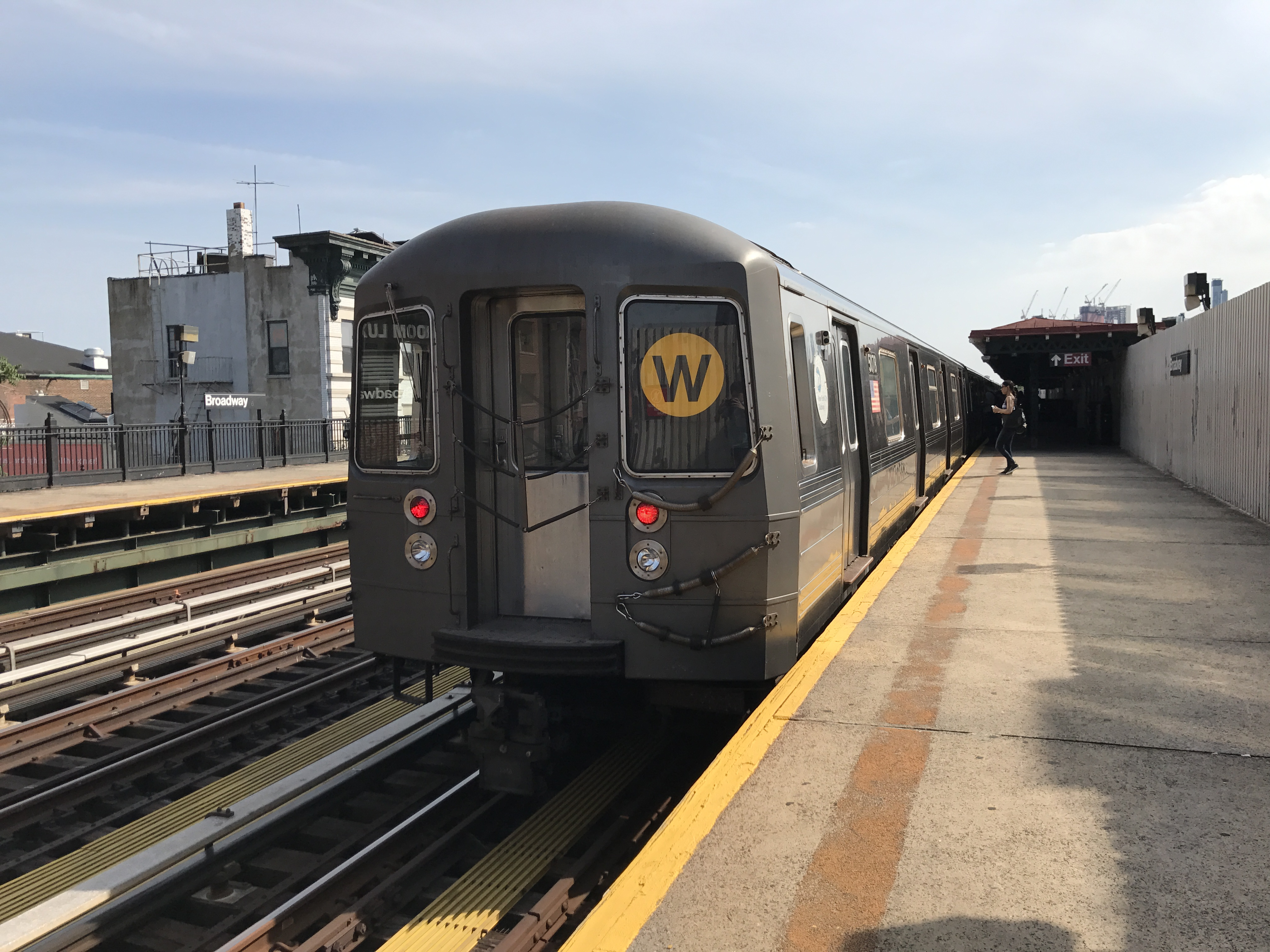
A W train of R68As leaving Broadway

Plans for the W train were announced in late 2000, when the Metropolitan Transportation Authority announced that the Manhattan Bridge's south tracks would reopen and that the north tracks would be closed. W service began on July 22, 2001. The route initially operated 24 hours daily. Weekday rush hour and midday service operated between Astoria–Ditmars Boulevard in Queens and Coney Island–Stillwell Avenue in Brooklyn; service bypassed all stations between Astoria Boulevard and Queensboro Plaza between 6 a.m. and 9 p.m. (in the southbound direction between 6 a.m. and 1 p.m., and in the northbound direction from 1 p.m. to 9 p.m.), operated via the 60th Street Tunnel, made express stops in Manhattan via the Broadway Line (stopping at 49th Street in both directions), operated via the Manhattan Bridge south tracks, made express stops in Brooklyn via Fourth Avenue (bypassing DeKalb Avenue in both directions), and made all stops via the West End Line. Weekday evening service short-turned at 57th Street–Seventh Avenue in Manhattan and did not operate to or from Ditmars Boulevard; evening service in Manhattan and Brooklyn was the same as weekday rush hour and midday service, except trains bypassed 49th Street in both directions. Weekend daytime and daily overnight service operated as a shuttle within Brooklyn only; weekend service operated between Atlantic Avenue–Pacific Street and Stillwell Avenue, making express stops via Fourth Avenue; daily overnight service operated between 36th Street and Stillwell Avenue.

After the September 11, 2001 attacks, W service initially operated as a shuttle between DeKalb and Stillwell Avenues before being restored to its normal route by the evening of September 12. On September 17, daytime W service operated between Ditmars Boulevard and Stillwell Avenue to replace the N, which got suspended; trains made all stops in Queens and Manhattan and express stops in Brooklyn and operated via the Manhattan Bridge. Overnight service was split into two sections, with the northern section operating between Ditmars Boulevard and 34th Street–Herald Square, and the southern section operating between 36th Street and Stillwell Avenue. Normal W service was restored on October 28. When the December 16, 2001 schedule went into effect, two weekday morning rush hour northbound trains terminated at 57th Street, and one evening rush hour southbound train originated at 57th Street.

Weekday peak direction express service in Queens was discontinued on January 7, 2002 due to unpopularity among residents along the Astoria Line. This change was approved by the MTA Board in December 2001. Express service was implemented on the Astoria Line in order to improve operations at the Ditmars Boulevard terminal, and because 43% of the line's riders boarded at express stations. Instead, the change yielded no operational benefits, and made local N trains overcrowded, and express W trains underutilized. N trains carried 1.9 times as many passengers as W trains in the morning, and 2.6 times as many in the evening. W express service had been suspended after the September 11 attacks to replace N service. Even after normal service resumed in October 2001, local W service was kept until November 19 on a trial basis. Analysis of the operating pattern found that the terminal could handle the all-local service pattern and that the ridership split between the N and W was more balanced. Evening service was extended beyond 57th Street and originated and terminated at Ditmars Boulevard starting in July, matching the weekday rush hour and midday service pattern.

On September 8, 2002, as a result of ongoing reconstruction taking place at the Stillwell Avenue Terminal, W service was revised to operate between Ditmars Boulevard and Stillwell Avenue 24 hours. Weekday daytime service prior this date remained the same, but weekend daytime and daily overnight service was rerouted to operate via the Montague Street Tunnel to replace the N; in addition, service during this time made all stops along the reroute. This change also gave the West End Line overnight service to Manhattan for the first time since 1977.

On April 27, 2003, early evening weekend service was increased from running every 12 minutes to every 8 minutes, and Sunday morning and early evening service were increased to run every 8 minutes instead of every 10 minutes.

=== 2004–2010 ===
When the Manhattan Bridge's north tracks were restored to service on February 22, 2004, the W was curtailed to its current service pattern, running weekdays only from 7:00 a.m. to 9:30 p.m. as an entirely local service between Astoria–Ditmars Boulevard and Whitehall Street–South Ferry, Lower Manhattan. The Brooklyn portion was replaced by the D, which was extended over the north side of the bridge and down the West End Line. W service between Manhattan and Queens remained, because of increasing ridership on the BMT Astoria Line. The first three W trains of the day entered service at 86th Street in Gravesend, Brooklyn and the last three trains of the night continued in service to Kings Highway. These trips ran local in Brooklyn via the Montague Street Tunnel, BMT Fourth Avenue and BMT Sea Beach lines. On July 27, 2008, the W was extended to run until 11:00 p.m. in response to growth in the subway system's ridership.

On March 24, 2010, the MTA announced the elimination of the W due to financial shortfalls. In its place, on weekdays, the N train ran local north of Canal Street while the Q train was extended from 57th Street–Seventh Avenue to Astoria–Ditmars Boulevard, running local north of 34th Street–Herald Square. The W ceased operation on Friday, June 25, 2010, with the last train bound for Astoria–Ditmars Boulevard leaving Whitehall Street–South Ferry at 10:50 p.m.

=== 2015–present ===
In July 2015, the MTA announced it was considering restoring the W with its 2004–2010 service pattern following the opening of the first phase of the Second Avenue Subway, which would reroute the Q from the Astoria Line to 96th Street on Manhattan's Upper East Side. The W would replace the Q on the Astoria Line to continue maintaining two services on the line on weekdays.

On May 23, 2016, the MTA announced it would restore the W. Service was restored on November 7, 2016, running between 7:00 a.m. and 11:00 p.m. The Q was temporarily cut back to 57th Street–Seventh Avenue, allowing for a seamless extension to the Second Avenue Line, which opened on January 1, 2017. Additionally, the N train once again became express in Manhattan on weekdays between 34th Street–Herald Square and Canal Street. The W's restoration meant there would be 20 fewer trips to and from Astoria per weekday as the W ran for a shorter time span each day than the Q did. In June 2018, the MTA added service between 6:00 a.m. and 7:00 a.m., and between 11:00 p.m. and midnight in response to overcrowded N trains during those hours. As the N and W share the same fleet from the Coney Island Yard, a small number of W trains originate or terminate at 86th Street throughout the day. These trains operate via the Montague Street Tunnel and local along the BMT Fourth Avenue Line and BMT Sea Beach Line as they did prior to 2010.

In July 2019, the MTA introduced a proposal to end late evening service. Instead, W service would once again end at around 9:30 PM. In their proposal, the MTA noted that service often ended early on weeknights to accommodate planned work.

In March 2020, the W was temporarily suspended due to lack of ridership and train crew availability caused by the COVID-19 pandemic, though full service was restored in June. On December 29, 2021, W service was again suspended due to a shortage of crew members exacerbated by the COVID-19 pandemic; service was again restored on January 24, 2022.

On July 7, 2025, two southbound AM rush hour W trips that previously terminated at 86th Street were rerouted after 36th Street to terminate at Bay Parkway on the West End Line. This change was implemented to avoid delays in N service due to merging conflicts, and was briefly tested for evaluation in February 2025. These trips make express stops along the West End Line, stopping at Ninth Avenue and 62nd Street.

== Route ==
=== Signage history ===
Proposed 1988 bullet for a Broadway Express train (After the Q was moved to Sixth Avenue)

The current bullet used since 2016 (Also between 2001-2010)

=== Service pattern ===
The following table shows the lines used by the W, with shaded boxes indicating the route at the specified times:

Line	From	To	Tracks	Times	
Line	From	To	Tracks	Weekdays	Rush hours
BMT Astoria Line (full line)	Astoria–Ditmars Blvd	Queensboro Plaza	local		
60th Street Tunnel			all		
BMT Broadway Line (full line)	Lexington Avenue/59th Street	Canal Street	local		
BMT Broadway Line (full line)	City Hall	Whitehall Street–South Ferry	all		
Montague Street Tunnel			all		Limited service
BMT Fourth Avenue Line	Court Street	Jay Street–MetroTech	all		Limited service
BMT Fourth Avenue Line	DeKalb Avenue	59th Street/Fourth Avenue	local		Limited service
BMT Sea Beach Line	Eighth Avenue	86th Street	local		Limited service
BMT West End Line	Ninth Avenue	Bay Parkway	express		Limited southbound service

=== Stations ===
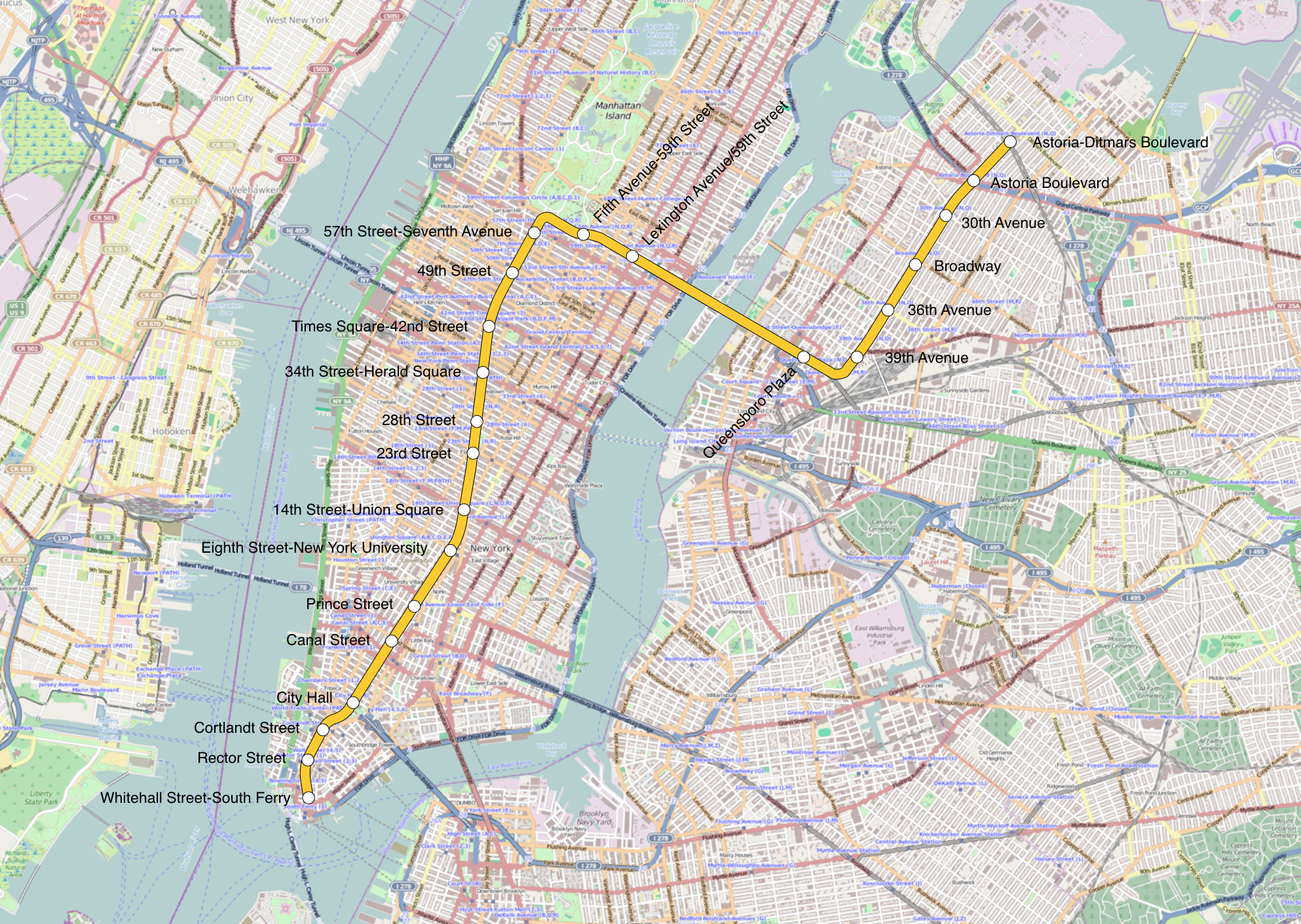
To scale line map

For a more detailed station listing, see the articles on the lines listed above.

Station service legend
Stops all times	Stops 24 hours a day
Stops all times except late nights	Stops every day during daytime hours only
Stops weekdays during the day	Stops during weekday daytime hours only
Stops rush hours in the peak direction only	Stops during weekday rush hours in the peak direction only
Station closed	Station closed
Stops rush hours only	Stops rush hours only (limited service not noted on map)
Time period details
Disabled access	Station is compliant with the Americans with Disabilities Act
↑	Station is compliant with the Americans with Disabilities Act in the indicated direction only
↓	Station is compliant with the Americans with Disabilities Act in the indicated direction only
	Elevator access to mezzanine only

BP	86th	Stations	Disabled access	Subway transfers	Connections and notes
Queens
Astoria Line
↓	Stops weekdays during the day	Astoria–Ditmars Boulevard		N	
↓	Stops weekdays during the day	Astoria Boulevard	Disabled access	N	M60 Select Bus Service to LaGuardia Airport
↓	Stops weekdays during the day	30th Avenue		N	
↓	Stops weekdays during the day	Broadway		N	
↓	Stops weekdays during the day	36th Avenue		N	
↓	Stops weekdays during the day	39th Avenue		N	
↓	Stops weekdays during the day	Queensboro Plaza	Disabled access	N 7 <7> (IRT Flushing Line)	
Manhattan
Broadway Line
↓	Stops weekdays during the day	Lexington Avenue–59th Street		N R 4 5 6 <6> (IRT Lexington Avenue Line at 59th Street); Out-of-system transfer with MetroCard/OMNY: F M N Q R (63rd Street Lines at Lexington Avenue–63rd Street)	Roosevelt Island Tramway
↓	Stops weekdays during the day	Fifth Avenue–59th Street		N R	
↓	Stops weekdays during the day	57th Street–Seventh Avenue	Disabled access	N Q R	
↓	Stops weekdays during the day	49th Street	↑	N R	Station is accessible in the northbound direction only.
↓	Stops weekdays during the day	Times Square–42nd Street	Disabled access	N Q R 1 2 3 (IRT Broadway–Seventh Avenue Line); 7 <7> (IRT Flushing Line); A C E (IND Eighth Avenue Line at 42nd Street–Port Authority Bus Terminal); S (42nd Street Shuttle); B D F <F> M (IND Sixth Avenue Line at 42nd Street–Bryant Park, daytime only)	Port Authority Bus Terminal; M34A Select Bus Service
↓	Stops weekdays during the day	34th Street–Herald Square	Disabled access	N Q R B D F <F> M (IND Sixth Avenue Line)	M34 / M34A Select Bus Service; PATH at 33rd Street; Amtrak, LIRR, NJ Transit at Pennsylvania Station
↓	Stops weekdays during the day	28th Street		R	
↓	Stops weekdays during the day	23rd Street		R	M23 Select Bus Service
↓	Stops weekdays during the day	14th Street–Union Square	Disabled access	N Q R L (BMT Canarsie Line); 4 5 6 <6> (IRT Lexington Avenue Line)	M14A / M14D Select Bus Service
↓	Stops weekdays during the day	Eighth Street–New York University		R	
↓	Stops weekdays during the day	Prince Street		R	
↓	Stops weekdays during the day	Canal Street	Elevator access to mezzanine only	N Q R 6 <6> (IRT Lexington Avenue Line); J Z (BMT Nassau Street Line)	Some northbound rush hour trips begin at this station.
↓	Stops weekdays during the day	City Hall		R	
↓	Stops weekdays during the day	Cortlandt Street	Disabled access	R 2 3 (IRT Broadway–Seventh Avenue Line at Park Place); A C (IND Eighth Avenue Line at Chambers Street); E (IND Eighth Avenue Line at World Trade Center)	PATH at World Trade Center
↓	Stops weekdays during the day	Rector Street		R	
↓	Stops weekdays during the day	Whitehall Street–South Ferry	Elevator access to mezzanine only	R 1 (IRT Broadway–Seventh Avenue Line at South Ferry)	M15 Select Bus Service; Staten Island Ferry at Whitehall Terminal
Brooklyn
Montague Street branch (Limited rush hour service)
↓	Stops rush hours only (limited service)	Court Street	Elevator access to mezzanine only	R 2 3 (IRT Broadway–Seventh Avenue Line at Borough Hall); 4 5 (IRT Eastern Parkway Line at Borough Hall)	
↓	Stops rush hours only (limited service)	Jay Street–MetroTech	Disabled access	R A C F <F> (IND Fulton Street and Culver Lines)	
↓	Stops rush hours only (limited service)	DeKalb Avenue	Disabled access	B N Q R	
Fourth Avenue Line
↓	Stops rush hours only (limited service)	Atlantic Avenue–Barclays Center	Disabled access	D N R B Q (BMT Brighton Line); 2 3 4 5 (IRT Eastern Parkway Line)	LIRR Atlantic Branch at Atlantic Terminal
↓	Stops rush hours only (limited service)	Union Street		N R	
↓	Stops rush hours only (limited service)	Ninth Street		N R F G (IND Culver Line at Fourth Avenue)	
↓	Stops rush hours only (limited service)	Prospect Avenue		N R	
↓	Stops rush hours only (limited service)	25th Street		N R	
↓	Stops rush hours only (limited service)	36th Street		D N R	
West End Line (two southbound morning trains)
↓	—N/a	Ninth Avenue		D R	
↓	—N/a	62nd Street	Disabled access	D R N W (BMT Sea Beach Line at New Utrecht Avenue)	
↓	—N/a	Bay Parkway	Disabled access	D R	B82 Select Bus Service
Fourth Avenue Line
—N/a	Stops rush hours only (limited service)	45th Street		N R	
—N/a	Stops rush hours only (limited service)	53rd Street		N R	
—N/a	Stops rush hours only (limited service)	59th Street	Disabled access	N R	
Sea Beach Line
—N/a	Stops rush hours only (limited service)	Eighth Avenue	Disabled access	N	
—N/a	Stops rush hours only (limited service)	Fort Hamilton Parkway		N	
—N/a	Stops rush hours only (limited service)	New Utrecht Avenue	Disabled access	N D R W (BMT West End Line at 62nd Street)	
—N/a	Stops rush hours only (limited service)	18th Avenue		N	
—N/a	Stops rush hours only (limited service)	20th Avenue		N	
—N/a	Stops rush hours only (limited service)	Bay Parkway		N	
—N/a	Stops rush hours only (limited service)	Kings Highway		N	B82 Select Bus Service
—N/a	Stops rush hours only (limited service)	Avenue U		N	
—N/a	Stops rush hours only (limited service)	86th Street		N	
