= Bocchino-Dente Memorial Plaza =

Plaza in Brooklyn, New York

Coordinates: 40.6338°N 74.0036°W

Bocchino-Dente Memorial Plaza is a 0.853-acre (3,450 m^{2}) plaza located at the intersection of Fort Hamilton Parkway, 58th Street and 10th Avenue in the Borough Park section of Brooklyn, New York. The neighborhood's streets were laid out in a grid of streets and avenues at the turn of the 20th century while Fort Hamilton Parkway cuts diagonally through the grid on its route between Prospect Park and Bay Ridge. Triangular intersections that were too small to be developed were designated as public plazas, including this one. The plaza adjoins the school yard of Public School 105 The Blythebourne School, which carries the old name of Borough Park.

In 1952, local City Councilman Arthur A. Low sponsored legislation to designate this triangle as the Bocchino-Dente Memorial Plaza in honor of local residents John Bocchino and Alfred Dente, who had been killed in the Second World War. The renaming was supported by the local post of the American Legion which carried the name Bocchino-Dente Post 1777. The local law to designate this plaza with this name was enacted on May 15, 1952, after the signature of the mayor of New York.
