= Fort Hamilton Parkway station (BMT Sea Beach Line) =

New York City Subway station in Brooklyn

Fort Hamilton Parkway
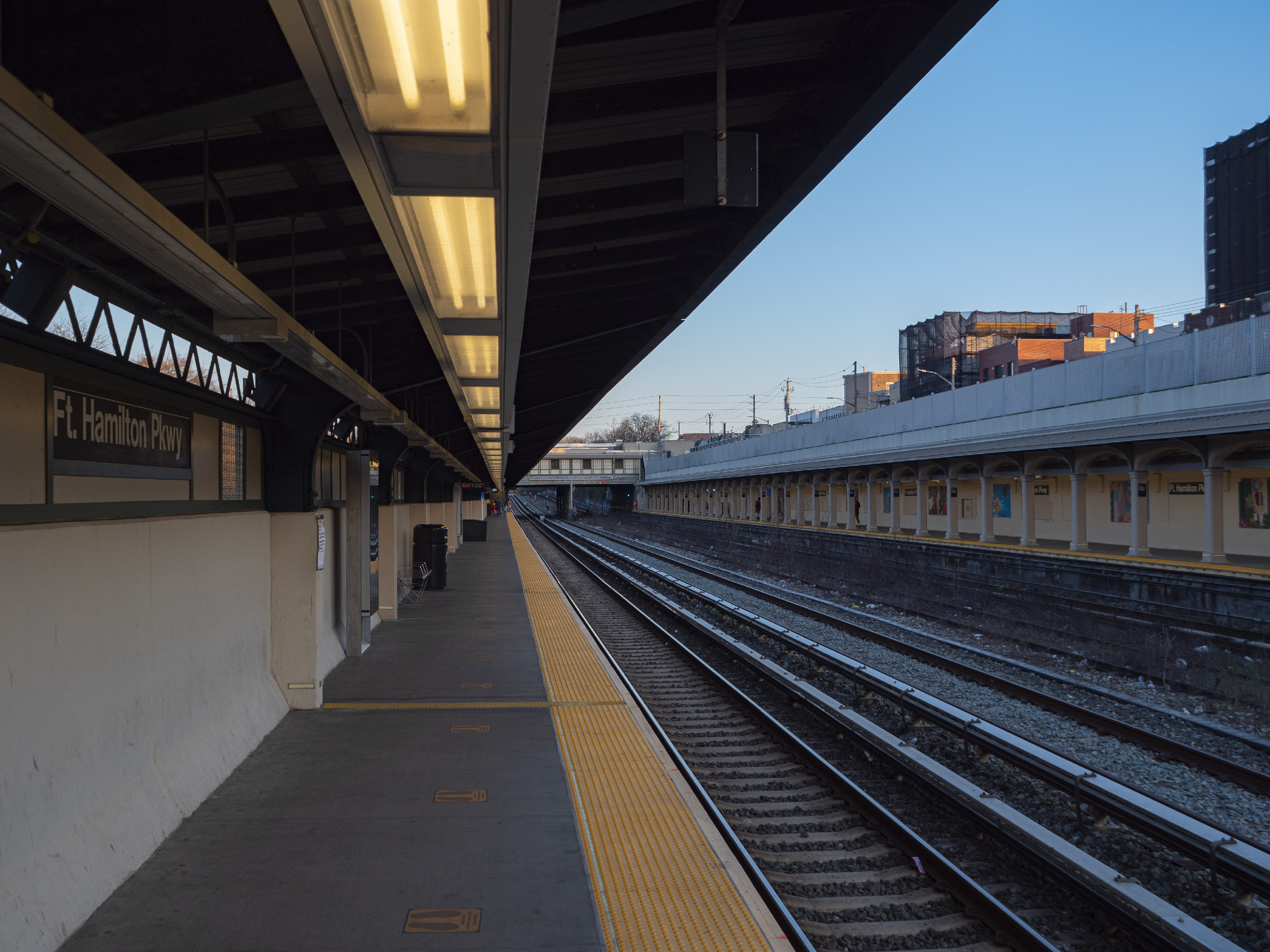
- View from northbound platform

Station statistics
- Address: Fort Hamilton Parkway & 62nd Street; Brooklyn, New York
- Borough: Brooklyn
- Locale: Borough Park
- Coordinates: 40°37′55.56″N 74°0′23.49″W
- Division: B (BMT)
- Line: BMT Sea Beach Line
- Services: N (all times); W (selected rush-hour trips)
- Transit: NYCT Bus: B9 (on 60th Street), B16
- Structure: Open-cut
- Platforms: 2 side platforms
- Tracks: 4 (2 in regular service)

Other information
- Opened: June 22, 1915; 111 years ago
- Former/other names: Fort Hamilton Avenue

Traffic
- 2025: 1,628,660 ▲6%
- Rank: 213 out of 423
Services
Preceding station	New York City Subway	Following station
Eighth Avenue N W toward Astoria–Ditmars Boulevard	Local	New Utrecht Avenue N W toward Coney Island–Stillwell Avenue
Location
Location within New York City Subway
Location within New York City
Location within New York
Track layout
Street map
Station service legend
Symbol	Description
Stops all times	Stops all times
Stops rush hours only	Stops rush hours only
Stops rush hours in the peak direction only	Stops rush hours in the peak direction only

The Fort Hamilton Parkway station is a local station on the BMT Sea Beach Line of the New York City Subway, located in Borough Park, Brooklyn at the intersection of Fort Hamilton Parkway and 62nd Street. It is served by the N train at all times. During rush hours, several W trains also serve this station.

== History ==
This station opened on June 22, 1915.

From January 18, 2016 to May 22, 2017, the Manhattan-bound platform at this station was closed for renovations. The Coney Island-bound platform was closed from July 31, 2017 to July 1, 2019.

== Station layout ==
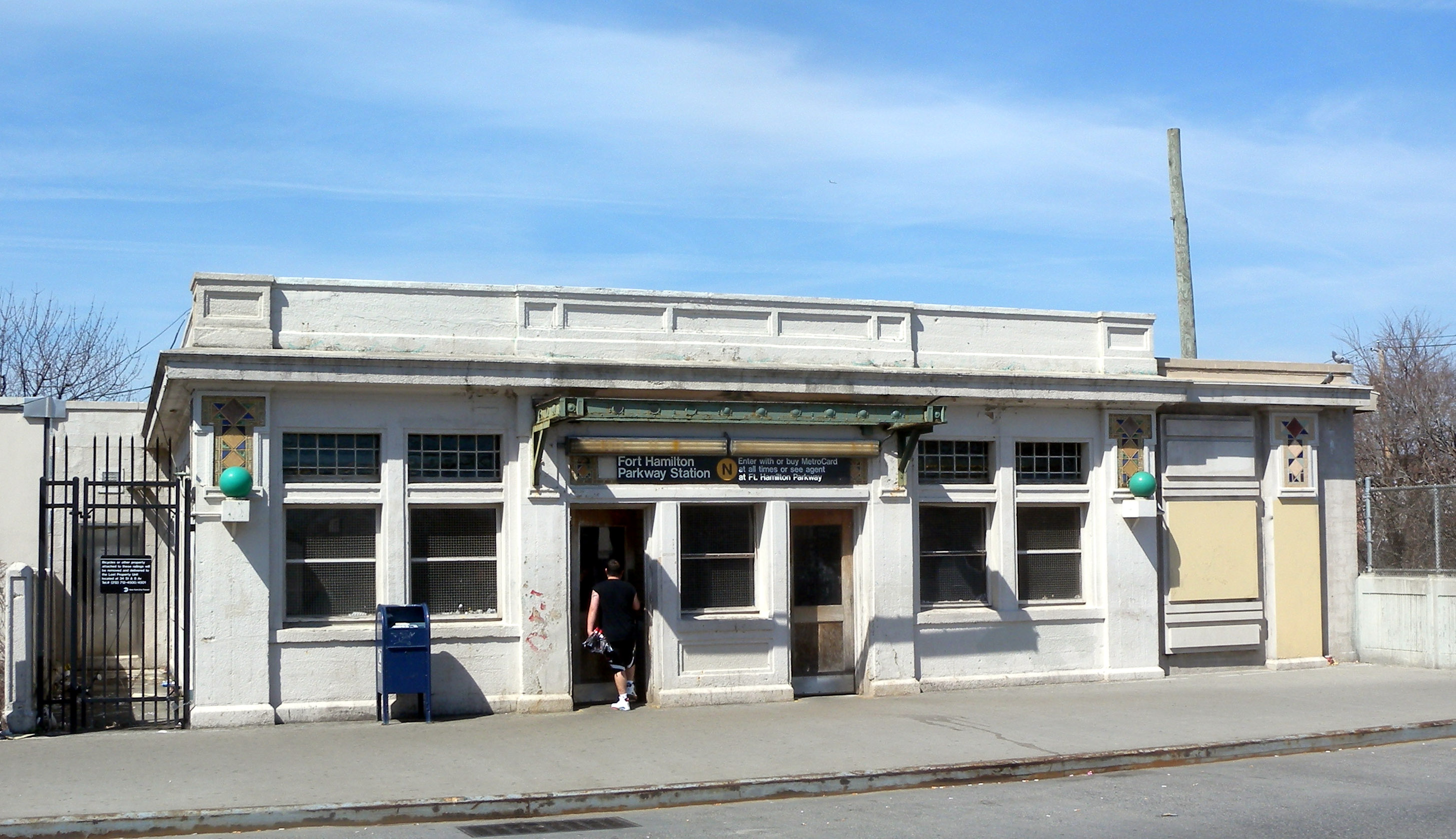
The 11th Avenue station house

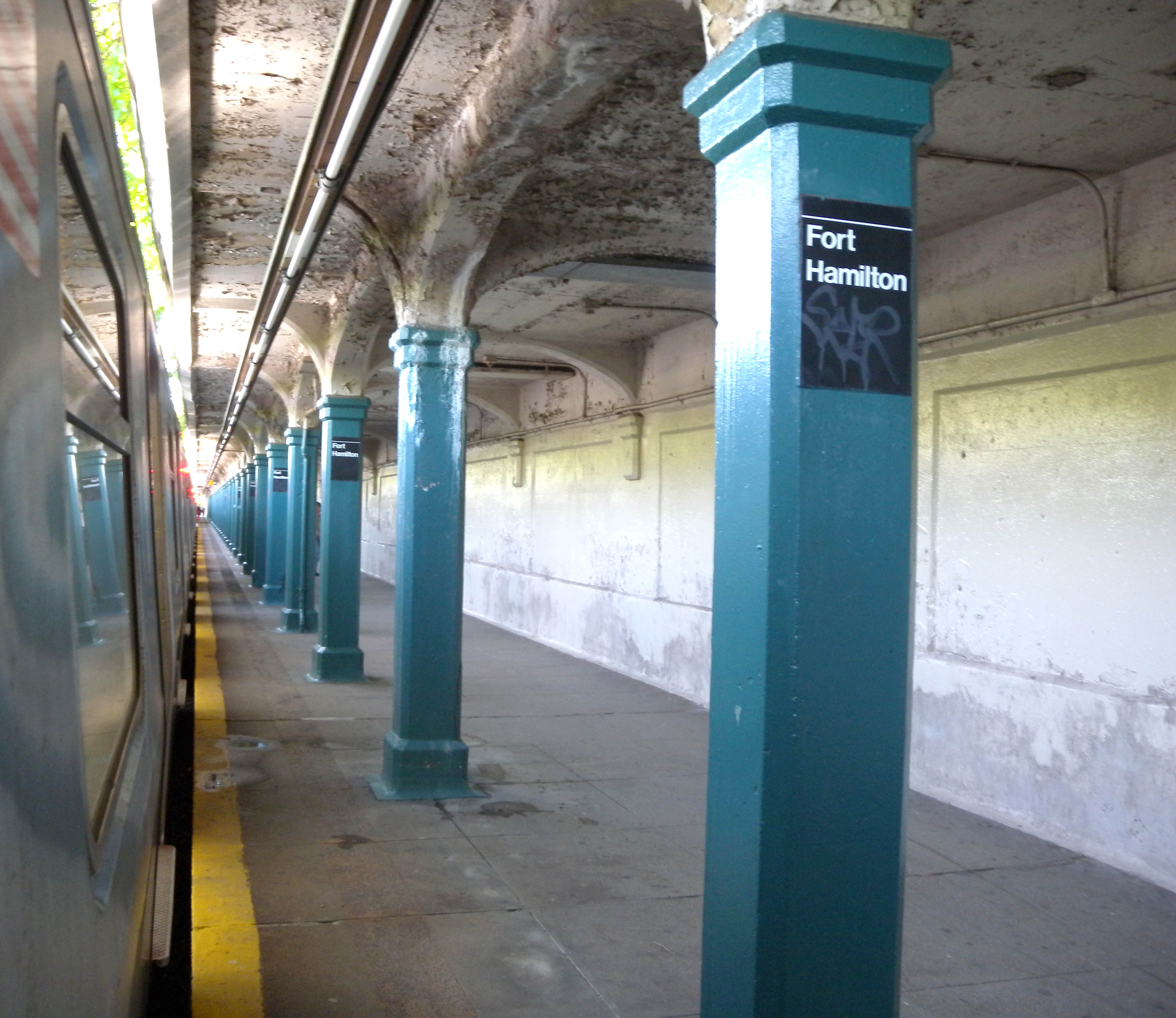
Southbound platform pre-renovation

This open-cut station has four tracks and two side platforms, but the two center express tracks are not normally used. The northbound platform has metal canopies while the southbound platform has beige concrete walls, columns, and roof (prior to renovation, the columns were blue-green).

At this point, the LIRR Bay Ridge Branch runs alongside north of the line.

=== Exits ===
Each end has a crossover. The full-time west exit leads to Fort Hamilton Parkway and 62nd Street while the HEET east exit leads to 11th Avenue and 62nd–63rd Streets. The distance between 11th Avenue and Fort Hamilton Parkway makes the platforms much longer than a typical "B" Division train. The station house's construction is stucco with tile interior.
