= Fort Hamilton Parkway station (BMT Culver Line) =

Fort Hamilton Parkway
- Former New York City Subway station
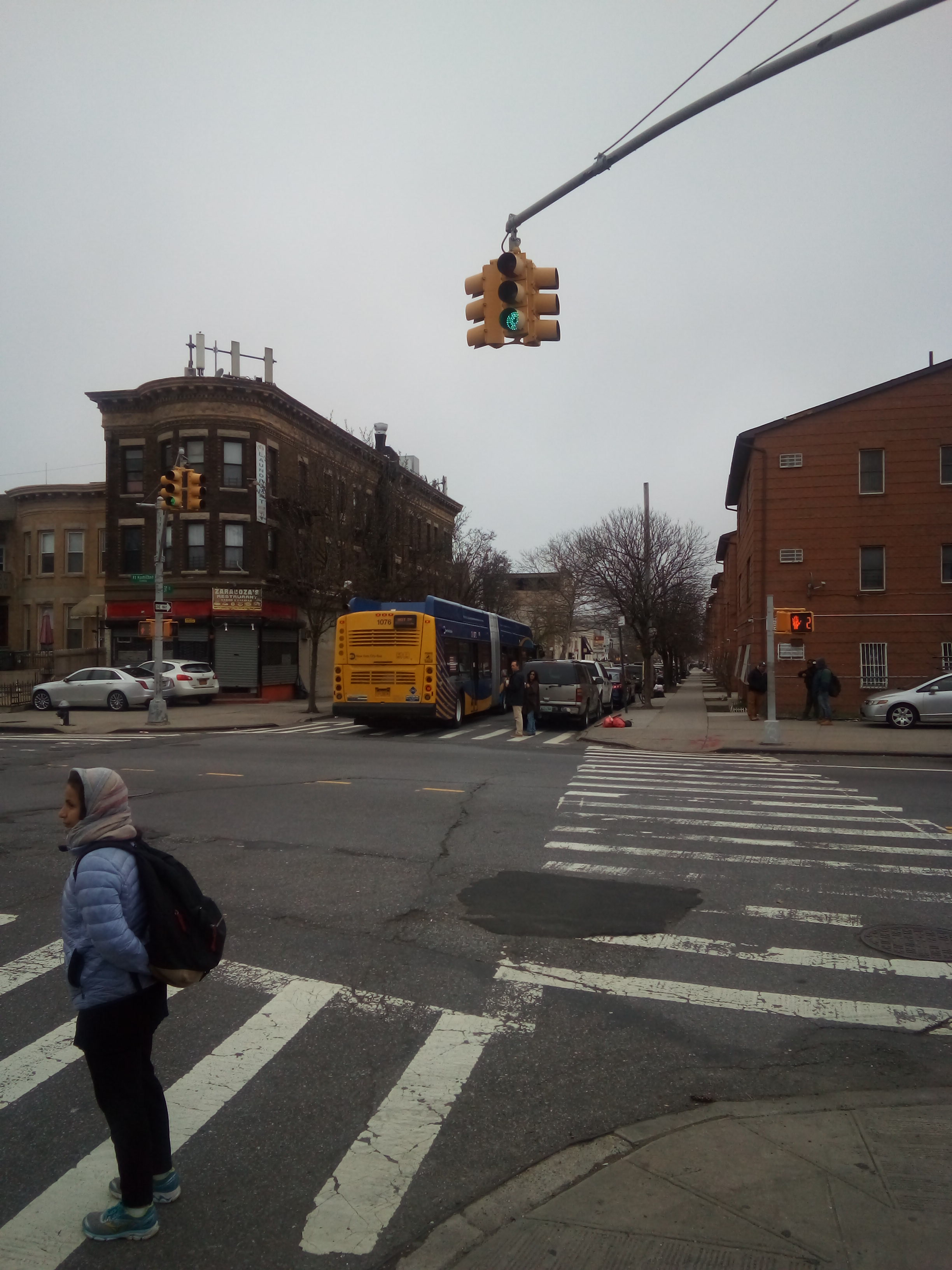
- The former site of the Fort Hamilton Parkway Culver Shuttle station

Station statistics
- Address: 37th Street & Fort Hamilton Parkway; Brooklyn, NY 11218
- Borough: Brooklyn
- Locale: Borough Park
- Coordinates: 40°38′38.83″N 73°59′20.57″W
- Division: B (BMT)
- Services: BMT Culver Line
- Structure: Elevated
- Platforms: 2 side platforms
- Tracks: 3

Other information
- Opened: March 16, 1919; 106 years ago
- Closed: May 11, 1975; 50 years ago

Station succession
- Next north: Ninth Avenue
- Next south: 13th Avenue
Location

Street map
Station service legend
Symbol	Description
Stops all times	Stops in station at all times
Stops all times except late nights	Stops all times except late nights
Stops late nights only	Stops late nights only
Stops late nights and weekends	Stops late nights and weekends only
Stops weekdays during the day	Stops weekdays during the day
Stops weekends during the day	Stops weekends during the day
Stops all times except rush hours in the peak direction	Stops all times except rush hours in the peak direction
Stops all times except weekdays in the peak direction	Stops all times except weekdays in the peak direction
Stops daily except rush hours in the peak direction	Stops all times except nights and rush hours in the peak direction
Stops rush hours only	Stops rush hours only
Stops rush hours in the peak direction only	Stops rush hours in the peak direction only
Station closed	Station is closed
(Details about time periods)

The Fort Hamilton Parkway station was a station on the demolished section of the BMT Culver Line. It was located at the intersection of 37th Street and Fort Hamilton Parkway in Brooklyn, New York City.

== History ==
This station opened on March 16, 1919, as part of the BMT Culver Line. When the IND South Brooklyn Line was extended to Ditmas Avenue and converted most of the line to the Independent Subway System in 1954, the station's service was replaced by the Culver Shuttle. On May 28, 1959, the station and the line were reduced from three tracks to two.

By December 1960, the shuttle was reduced to a single track and platform, due to the December 1960 nor'easter and low ridership. The station closed on May 11, 1975, and the structure was demolished in the 1980s. The freight line that ran beneath the station and currently leads to the 36th–38th Street Yard can still be found embedded in the pavement across Fort Hamilton Parkway.

== Station layout ==
It originally had three tracks and two side platforms, although near the end of its life only utilized one track and one of the side platforms, due to the removal of the other two tracks.
