= Water Taxi Beach =

Urban beach in Queens, New York (2005–2010)

Coordinates: 40.742207°N 73.961302°W

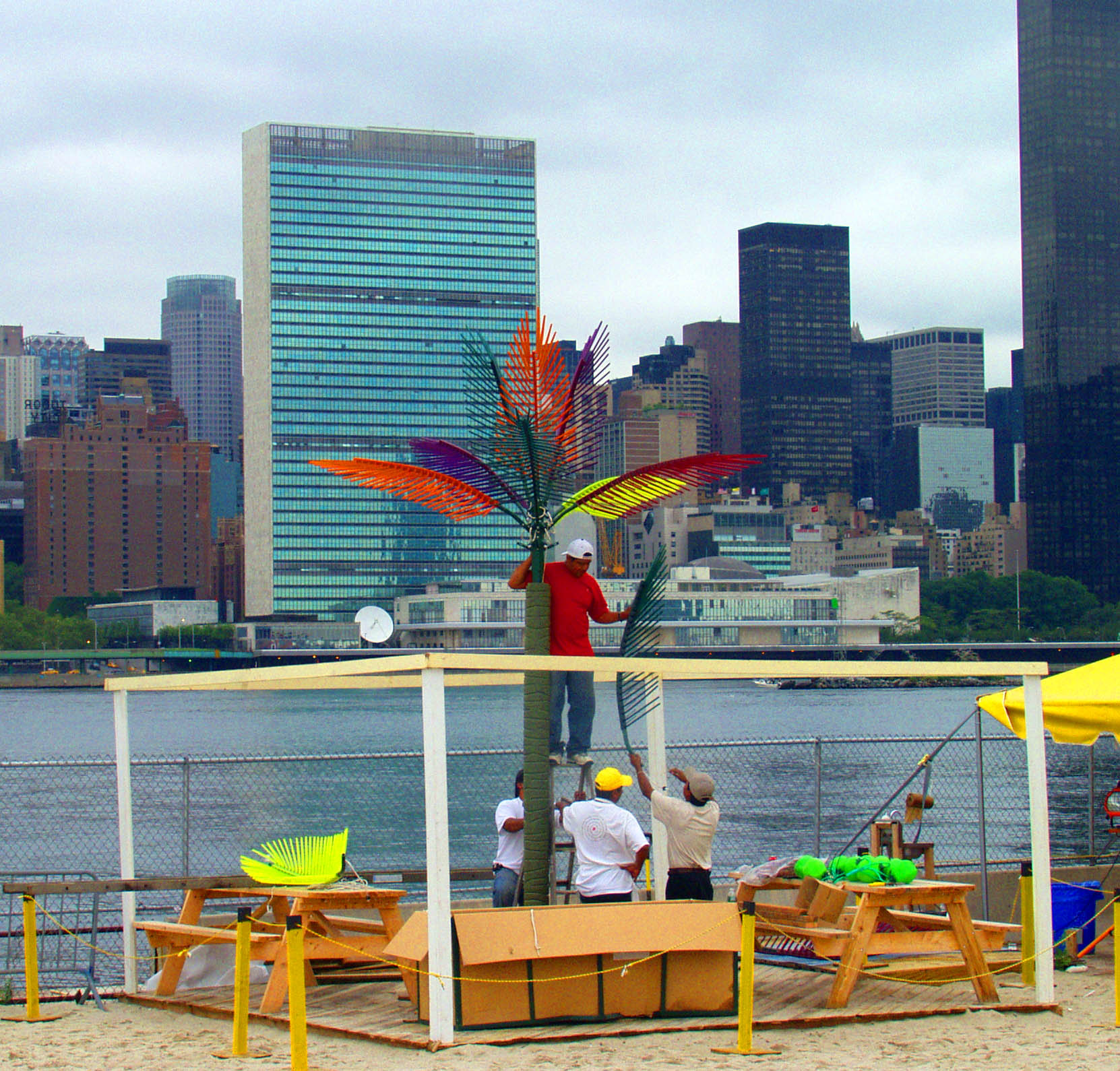
Artificial tree for artificial beach

Water Taxi Beach was an artificial temporary beach operated from 2005 to 2010 on a wharf on the East River in the Hunters Point section of Long Island City, in the New York City borough of Queens. It was operated by the New York Water Taxi Company and was open to the public for free during the summer months. The beach was also rented for private parties. In concept, Water Taxi Beach was similar to Paris Beach in Paris, France. The beach was operated by Harry Hawk and Tony Rosciglione and partners who ran the beach owned by NY Water Taxi, now Harbor Experience Companies. It was part of a public-private partnership with the Port Authority of New York and New Jersey.

The beach concept was created in 2005 as an experiment in community and economic development by New York Water Taxi to attract Manhattanites to Long Island City and to make weekend ferries serving the new residential high-rises near the beach financially viable. The success of the beach led New York Water Taxi to propose a similar project at the Atlantic Basin in Red Hook, Brooklyn. In 2005, the company started planning service to Governors Island, started service on June 2, 2008, and opened a Water Taxi beach there on July 10, 2009. A beach was also opened at the South Street Seaport on Memorial Day Weekend, 2009.

The restaurant Harry's at Water Taxi Beach served barbecue-type foods such as hamburgers, hot dogs, beer, wine, and tropical drinks. There was also a full catering menu. In May 2008, Harry's won first place in a contest to determine which restaurant had the best burger in the boroughs. Since 2007, Water Taxi Beach was one of the main sites of the annual NYC Food Film Festival.

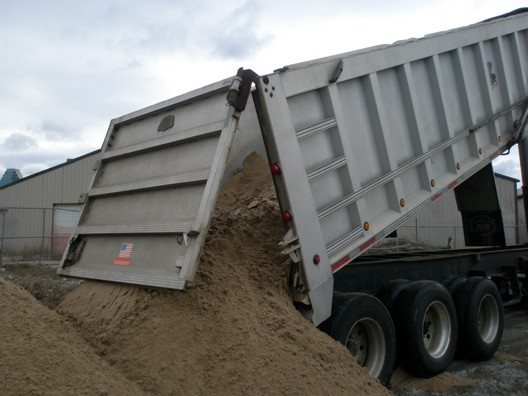
New sand arriving on March 19, 2008

In March 2008, additional sand was added to the property, expanding its size to about 44,000 square feet (4,100 m^{2}) and making room for three new beach volleyball courts.

== Property ownership ==
Water Taxi Beach was built and located on property owned by the Port Authority of New York and New Jersey. In 2009, the property was acquired by New York City and became under the control of the Economic Development Corporation (EDC). The land was located next to the Queens West development and slated to be redeveloped with residential housing and a waterfront park. Accordingly, the beach closed for construction works related to the development of Hunters Point South, after the 2010 season. The property is now part of Hunters Point South Park, which opened in 2013 and includes an urban beach near the former site of Water Taxi Beach.
