= Long Island City =

Neighborhood of Queens in New York City

- Neighborhood
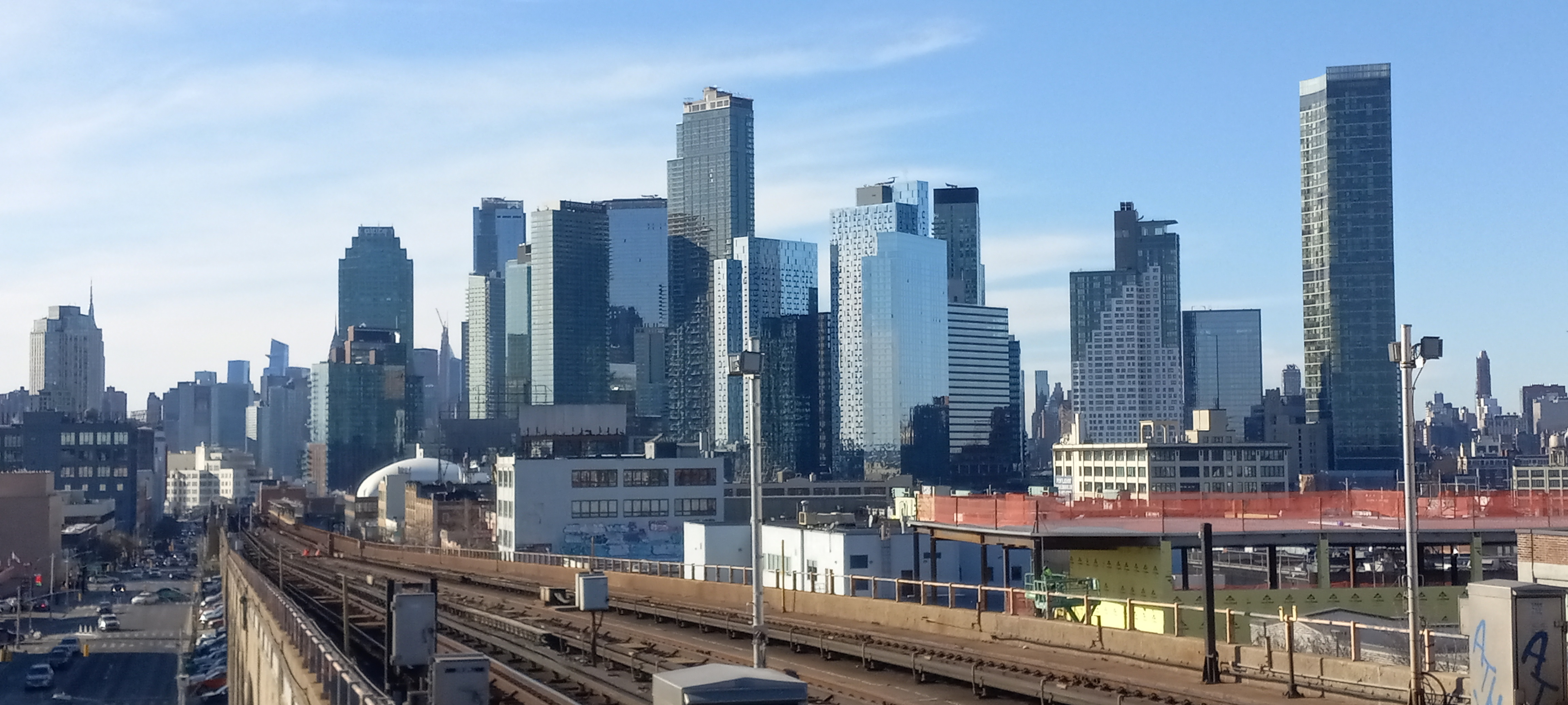
- The skyline of Long Island City in Queens seen from 40th Street–Lowery Street station in January 2025
- Nickname: "LIC"
- Interactive map of Long Island City
- Coordinates: 40.7509°N 73.9411°W
- Country: United States
- State: New York
- City: New York City
- County/Borough: Queens
- Community District: Queens 1, Queens 2

Population
  - Total: 63,000
- Time zone: UTC−5 (EST)
  - Summer (DST): UTC−4 (EDT)
- ZIP Codes: 11101–11106, 11109, 11120
- Area codes: 718, 347, 929, and 917

Long Island City (LIC) is a neighborhood within the New York City borough of Queens. It is bordered by Astoria to the north; the East River to the west; Sunnyside to the east; and Newtown Creek, which separates Queens from Greenpoint, Brooklyn, to the south. Its name refers to its location on the western tip of Long Island.

Incorporated as a city in 1870, Long Island City was originally the seat of government of the Town of Newtown, before becoming part of the City of Greater New York in 1898. In the early 21st century, Long Island City became known for its rapid and ongoing residential growth and gentrification, its waterfront parks, and its thriving arts community. The area has a high concentration of art galleries, art institutions, and studio space. Long Island City is the eastern terminus of the Queensboro Bridge, the only non-tolled automotive route connecting Queens and Manhattan. Northeast of the bridge are the Queensbridge Houses, a development of the New York City Housing Authority and the largest public housing complex in the Western Hemisphere.

Long Island City is part of Queens Community District 1 to the north and Queens Community District 2 to the south. It is patrolled by the New York City Police Department's 108th Precinct. Politically, Long Island City is represented by the New York City Council's 26th District.

== History ==
=== As independent city ===
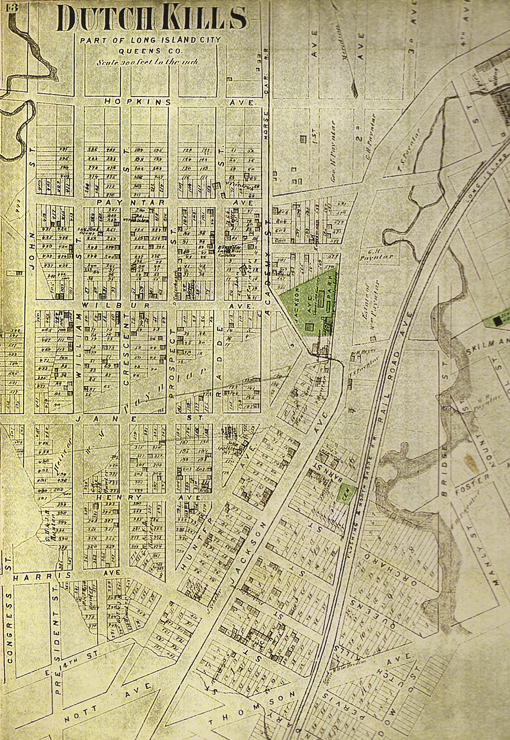
Early 1900s map of Dutch Kills from Greater Astoria Historical Society

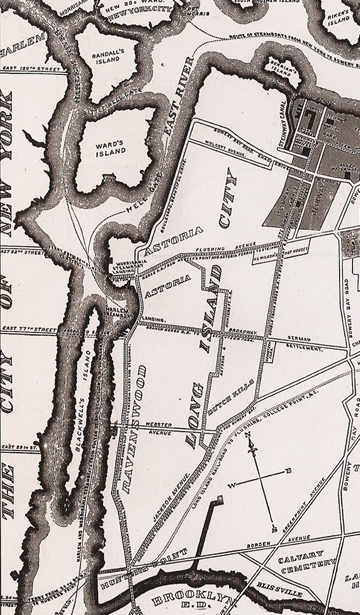
Map of Long Island City from Greater Astoria Historical Society

Long Island City was incorporated as a city on May 4, 1870, from the merging of the village of Astoria and the hamlets of Ravenswood, Hunters Point, Blissville, Sunnyside, Dutch Kills, Steinway, Bowery Bay and Middleton in the Town of Newtown. At the time of its incorporation, Long Island City had between 12,000 and 15,000 residents. Its charter provided for an elected mayor and a ten-member Board of Aldermen with two representing each of the city's five wards. City ordinances could be passed by a majority vote of the Board of Aldermen and the mayor's signature.

Long Island City held its first election on July 5, 1870. Residents elected A.D. Ditmars the first mayor; Ditmars ran as both a Democrat and a Republican. The first elected Board of Aldermen was H. Rudolph and Patrick Lonirgan (Ward 1); Francis McNena and William E. Bragaw (Ward 2); George Hunter and Mr. Williams (Third Ward); James R. Bennett and John Wegart (Ward Four); and E.M. Hartshort and William Carlin (Fifth Ward). The mayor and the aldermen were inaugurated on July 18, 1870.

The Common Council of Long Island City in 1873 adopted the coat of arms as "emblematical of the varied interest represented by Long Island City." It was designed by George H. Williams, of Ravenswood. The overall composition was inspired by New York City's coat of arms. The shield is rich in historic allusion, including Native American, Dutch, and English symbols.

In the 1880s, Mayor De Bevoise nearly bankrupted the Long Island City government by embezzlement, of which he was convicted. Many dissatisfied residents of Astoria circulated a petition to ask the New York State Legislature to allow it to secede from Long Island City and reincorporate as the Village of Astoria, as it existed prior to the incorporation of Long Island City, in 1884. The petition was ultimately dropped by the citizens.

Long Island City continued to exist as an incorporated city until 1898, when the city, the rest of the Town of Newtown (today known as Elmhurst, Queens) and other Towns in Queens were consolidated into New York City. The last mayor of Long Island City was an Irish-American named Patrick Jerome "Battle-Axe" Gleason.

==== Mayors of Long Island City, 1870–1897 ====
Mayors
Mayor	Party	Start year	End year
A.D. Ditmars	Democratic and Republican (Note: Ditmars' candidacy was endorsed by the Democratic and Republican parties. In 1873, Ditmars unsuccessfully ran for reelection as an Independent Democrat.)	1870	1873
Henry S. De Bevoise (Note: Mayor Debevoise was temporarily removed from office following accusations of embezzlement in September 1873. George H. Hunter served as acting mayor until the Board of Aldermen withdrew the articles of impeachment in April 1874.)	Democratic	1873	1874
George H. Hunter (acting)	Democratic	1873	1874
Henry S. De Bevoise	Democratic	1874	1875
A.D. Ditmars (Note: Mayor Ditmars resigned due to financial embarrassments, ill health, and intention to move south.)	Democratic	1875	1875
John Quinn (acting)	Democratic	1875	1876
Henry S. De Bevoise	Democratic	1876	1883
George Petry	Independent Democrat, Republican	1883	1887
Patrick J. Gleason	Democratic	1887	1897

=== After incorporation into New York City ===
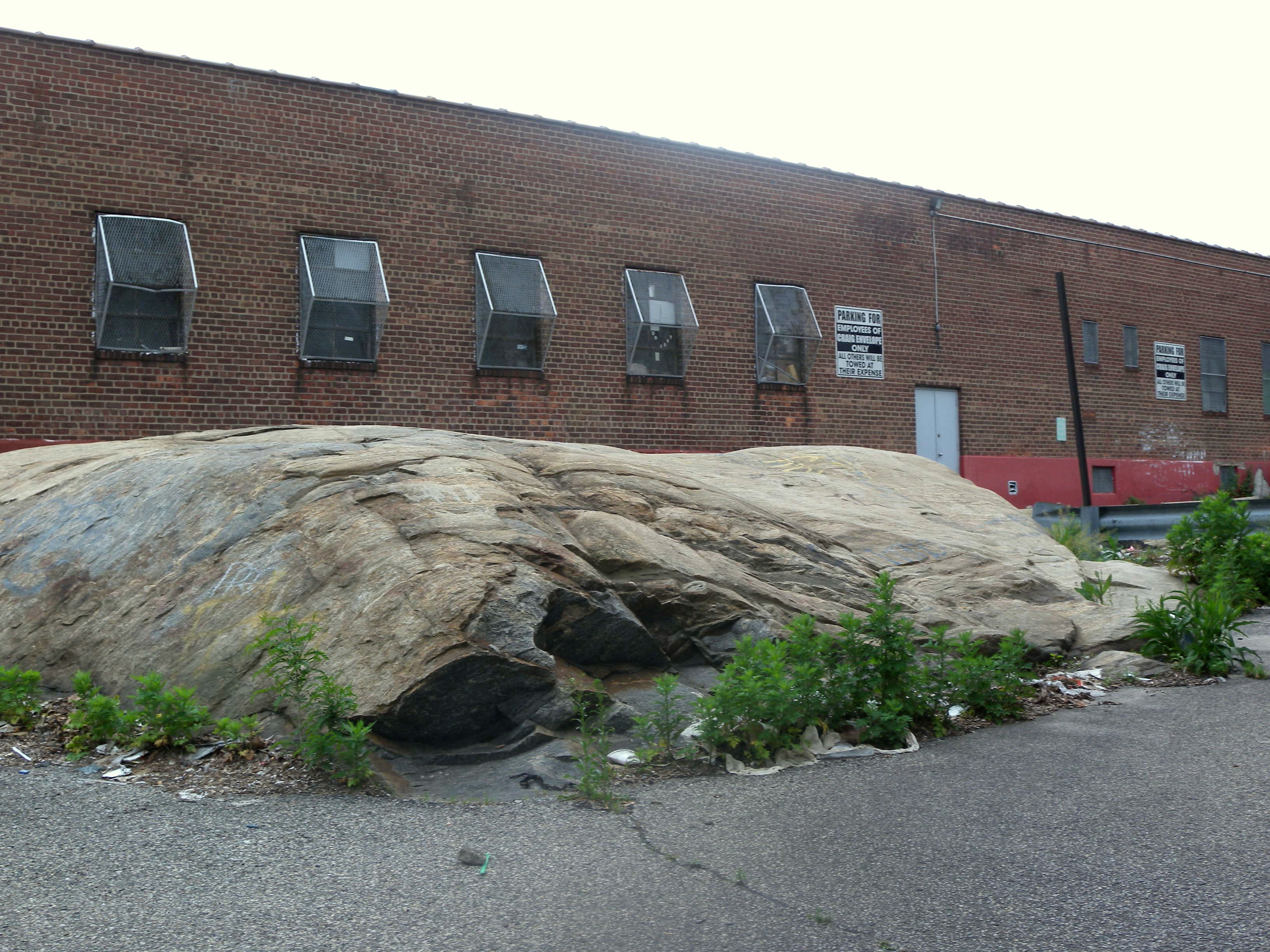
Ancient boulder, a glacial erratic, partly blocking 12th Street

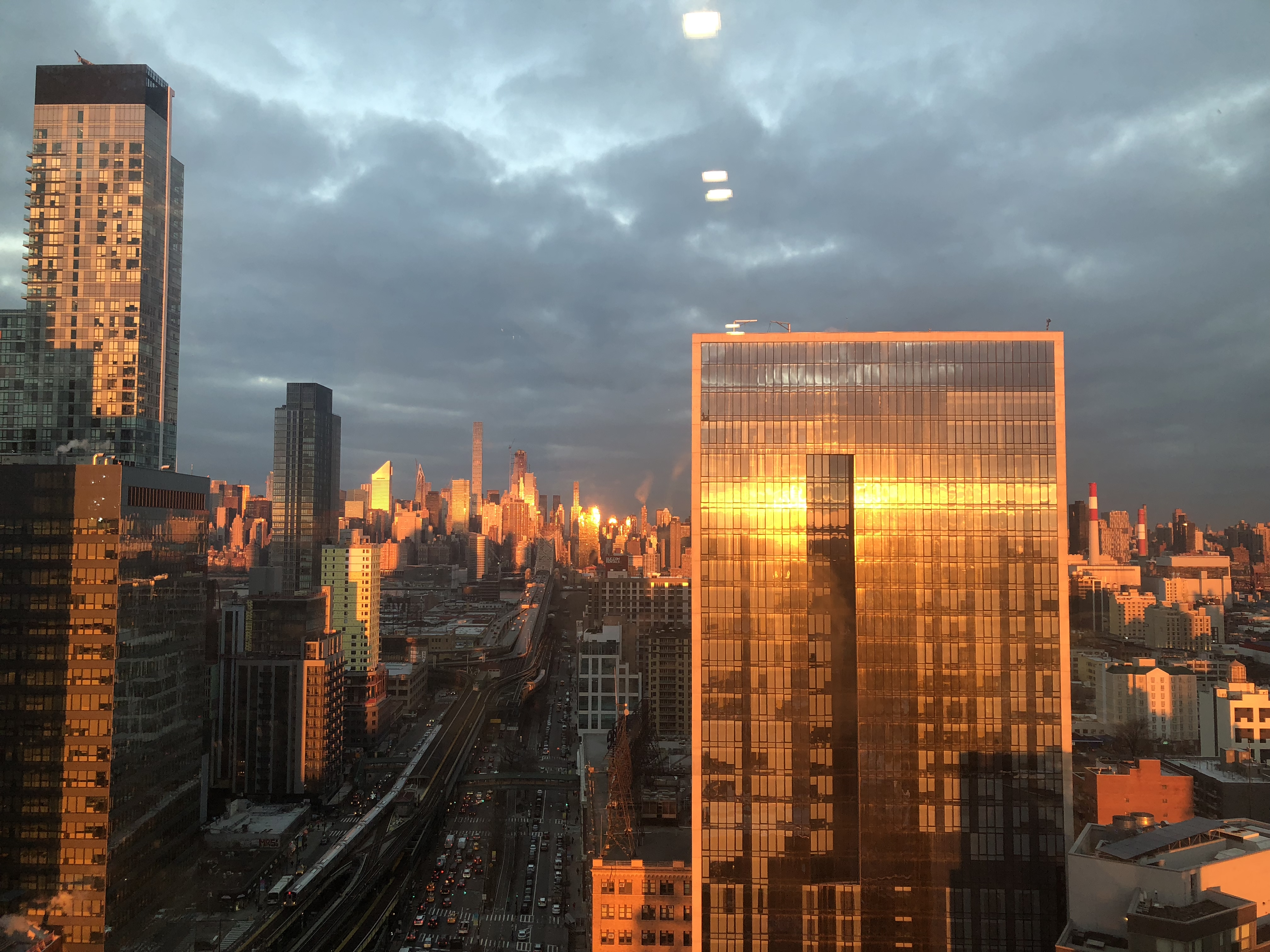
Looking west from an apartment building near Queens Plaza

The city surrendered its independence in 1898 to become part of the City of Greater New York. However, Long Island City survives as ZIP Code 11101 and ZIP Code prefix 111 (with its own main post office) and was formerly a sectional center facility (SCF). The Greater Astoria Historical Society, a nonprofit cultural and historical organization documenting the Long Island City area's history, has operated since 1985.

Through the 1930s, three subway tunnels, the Queens-Midtown Tunnel, and the Queensboro Bridge were built to connect the neighborhood to Manhattan. By the 1970s, the factories in Long Island City were being abandoned.

In the 1990s, Queens West on the west side of Long Island City was developed to revitalize 74 acres (30 ha) along the East River, with plans to bring in as many as 16,000 new residents in a total of 19 new buildings.

In 2001, the neighborhood was rezoned from an industrial neighborhood to a residential neighborhood, and the area underwent gentrification, with developments such as Hunter's Point South being built in the area. Since then, there has been substantial commercial and residential growth in Long Island City, with 41 new residential apartment buildings being built just between 2010 and 2017. A resident of nearby Woodside proposed establishing a Japantown in Long Island City in 2006, though this did not occur. By the mid-2010s, Long Island City was one of New York City's fastest-growing neighborhoods.

=== Historic landmarks ===
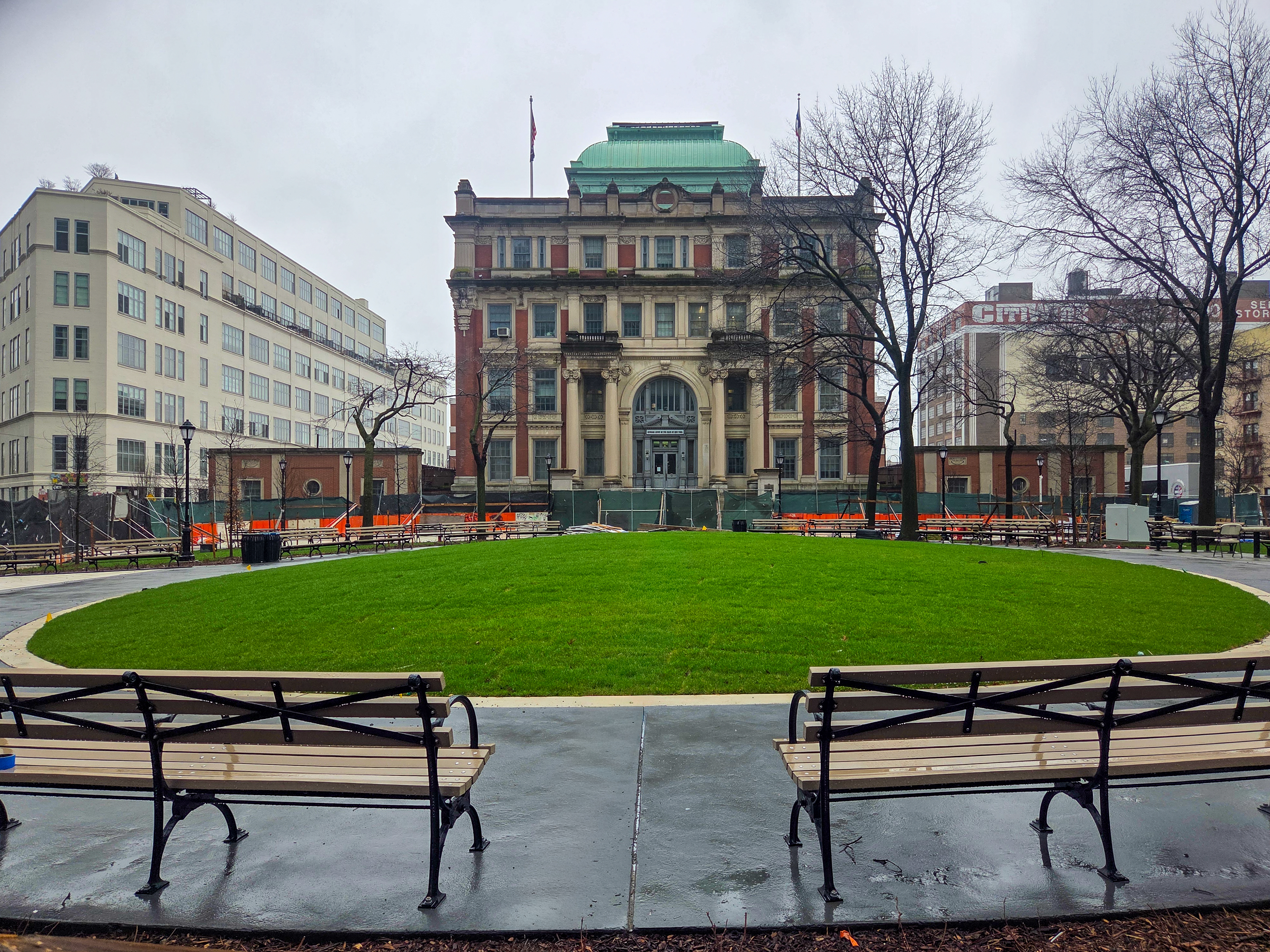
Long Island City Courthouse, with park in the foreground. March 2026

In addition to the Hunters Point Historic District and Queensboro Bridge, the 45th Road – Court House Square Station (Dual System IRT), Long Island City Courthouse Complex, and United States Post Office are listed on the National Register of Historic Places. New York City designated landmarks include the Pepsi-Cola sign along the East River; the Fire Engine Company 258, Hook and Ladder Company 115 firehouse; the Long Island City Courthouse; the New York Architectural Terra-Cotta Company building; and the Chase Manhattan Bank Building.

== Demographics ==
Based on data from the 2010 United States census, the population of the combined Queensbridge-Ravenswood-Long Island City neighborhood was 20,030, a decrease of 1,074 (5.1%) from the 21,104 counted in 2000. Covering an area of 540.94 acres (218.91 ha), the neighborhood had a population density of 37.0 inhabitants per acre (23,700/sq mi; 9,100/km^{2}).

The racial makeup of the neighborhood was 14.7% (2,946) White, 25.9% (5,183) African American, 0.3% (62) Native American, 15.5% (3,096) Asian, 0.0% (6) Pacific Islander, 1.2% (248) from other races, and 1.9% (385) from two or more races. Hispanic or Latino of any race were 40.5% (8,104) of the population.

Long Island City is split between Queens Community Board 1 to the north of Queens Plaza and Queens Community Board 2 south of Queens Plaza. The entirety of Queens Community Board 1, which comprises northern Long Island City and Astoria, had 199,969 inhabitants as of NYC Health's 2018 Community Health Profile, with an average life expectancy of 83.4 years. The entirety of Queens Community Board 2, which comprises southern Long Island City, Sunnyside and Woodside, had 135,972 inhabitants as of NYC Health's 2018 Community Health Profile, with an average life expectancy of 85.4 years. Both figures are higher than the median life expectancy of 81.2 for all New York City neighborhoods. In both community boards, most inhabitants are middle-aged adults and youth.

As of 2017, the median household income was $66,382 in Community Board 1 and $67,359 in Community Board 2. In 2018, an estimated 18% of Community Board 1 and 20% of Community Board 2 residents lived in poverty, compared to 19% in all of Queens and 20% in all of New York City. The unemployment rate was 8% in Community Board 1 and 5% in Community Board 2, compared to 8% in Queens and 9% in New York City. Rent burden, or the percentage of residents who have difficulty paying their rent, is 47% in Community Board 1 and 51% in Community Board 2, slightly lower than the citywide and boroughwide rates of 53% and 51% respectively. Based on this calculation, as of 2018, northern LIC is considered to be gentrifying, while southern LIC is considered to be high-income relative to the rest of the city and not gentrifying.

According to the 2020 census data from New York City Department of City Planning, the southern portion of Long Island City south of the Queensboro Bridge had an approximate average equal population of White and Asian residents with each their populations being between 10,000 and 19,999 residents, while the Hispanic and Black populations each were under 5,000 residents. North of the Queensboro Bridge in northern Long Island City had between 10,000 and 19,999 Hispanic residents while the White, Black, and Asian populations were each between 5,000 and 9,999 residents.

=== Long Island City Chinatown/Asiatown ===
According to a New York Times article from October 18, 2021, the Asian population of Long Island City has grown fivefold since 2010 nearing 11,000 residents making up 34% of the neighborhood's population. The new Asian residents are mainly Chinese, Bengalis, Koreans, and Japanese, and the neighborhood had at least 15 Asian-owned businesses in the neighborhood. Unlike the largely working-class Asian immigrant populations in southern Brooklyn and Lower Manhattan, the growing Asian population in Long Island City tends to be second- or third-generation Americans and are largely middle or upper class. Exceptionally however, the growing Asian population in NYCHA's Queensbridge Houses section of Long Island City at 11% are mostly from immigrant working-class backgrounds and largely have limited English skills, which has presented issues when residents are unable to find interpreters to communicate with NYCHA. New York City Council member Julie Won, who represents the neighborhood, has spoken about the need for outreach to the area's Asian residents and businesses.

In some later reports in 2024 onward, the large growing Asian enclave has been dubbed the Long Island City Chinatown as the Chinese immigrants make up a large portion of the growing upper class Asian population in the area.

== Commerce and economy ==
=== Developments and buildings ===
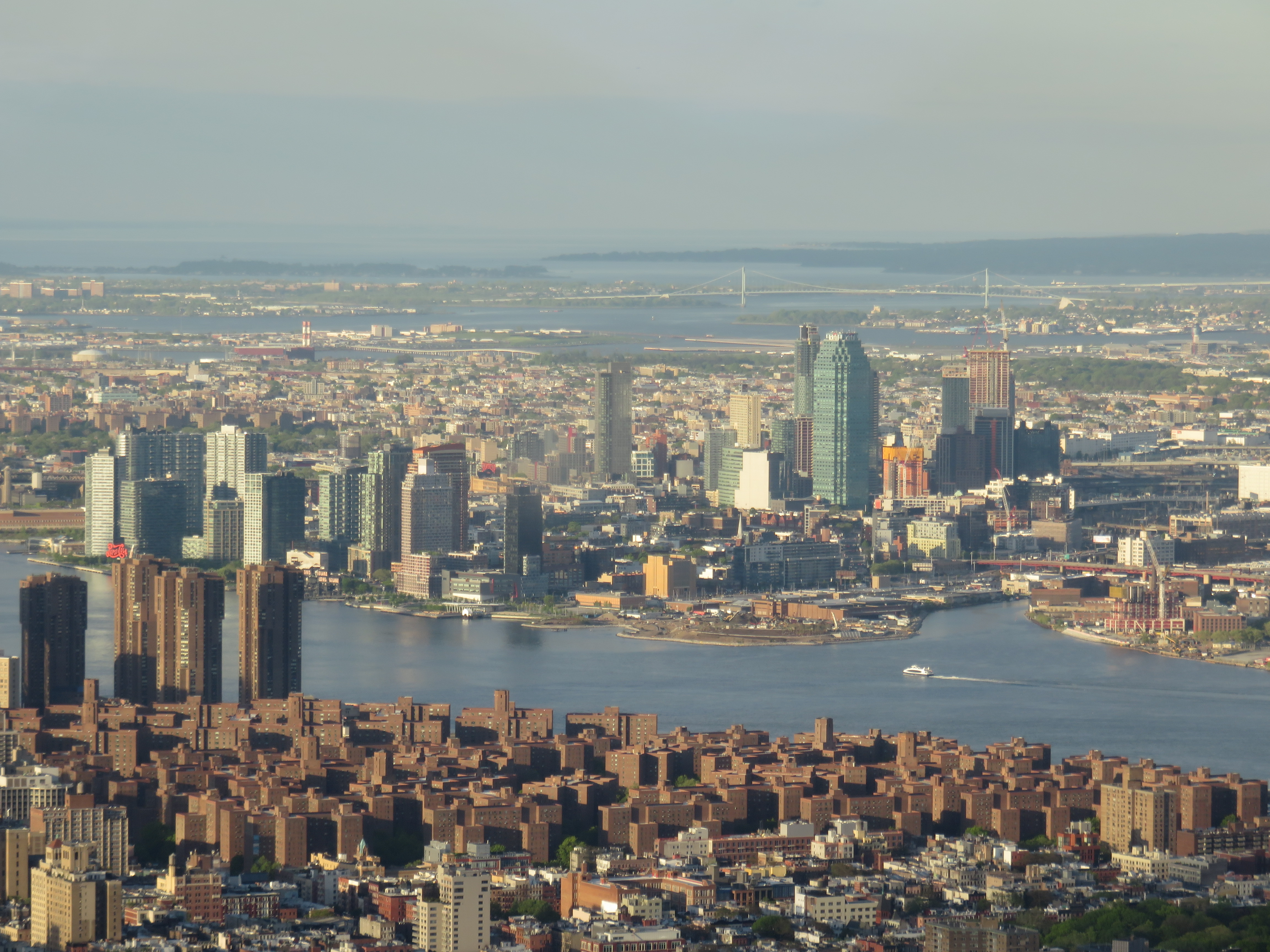
Long Island City in Queens as seen across the East River from One World Trade Center in Manhattan in 2017

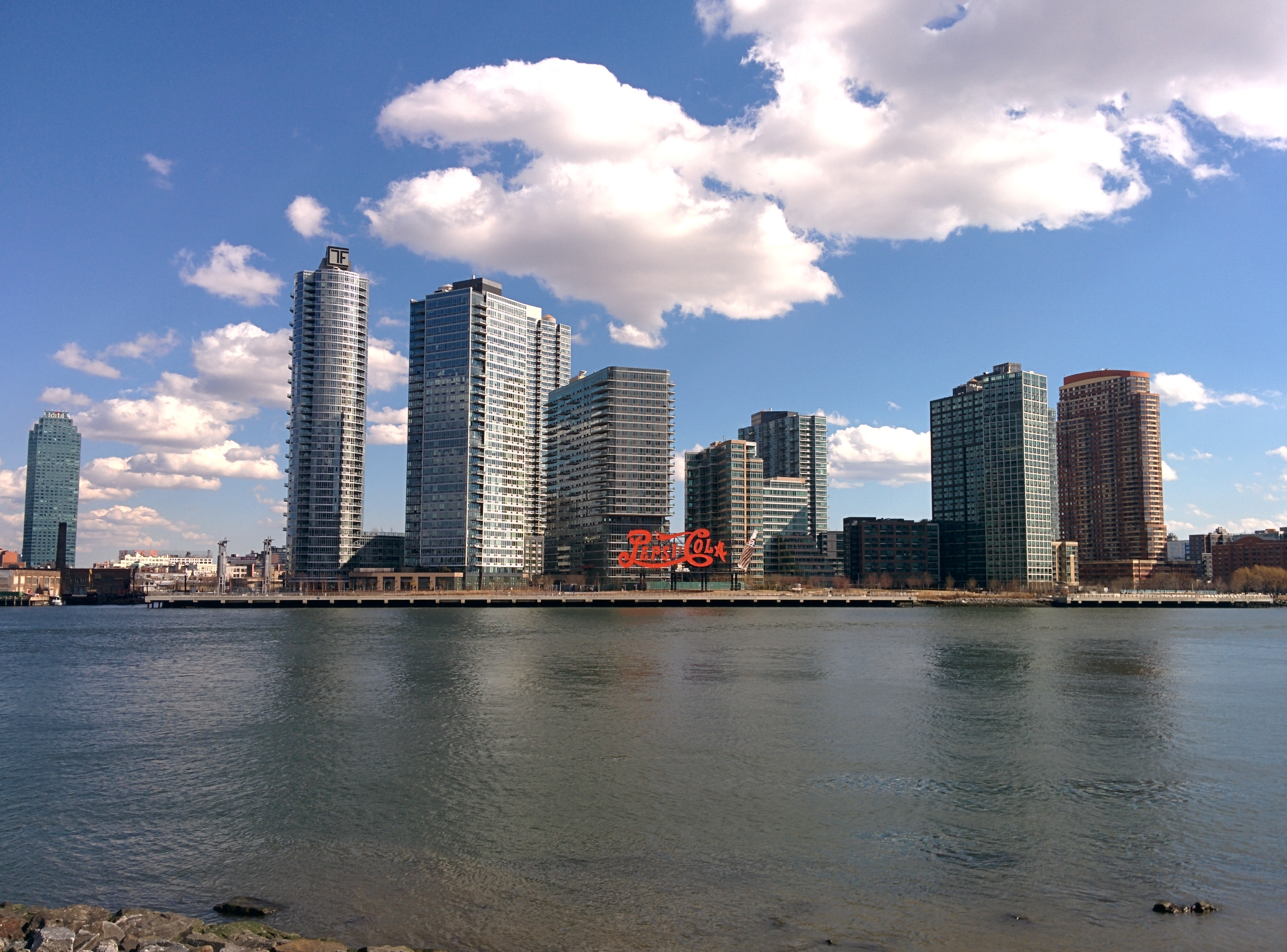
Gantry Plaza State Park as seen from the west

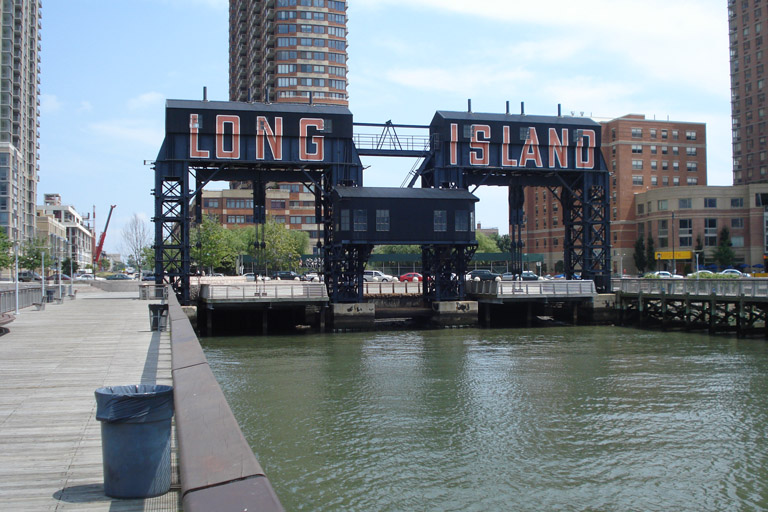
Gantry cranes in Gantry Plaza State Park on the Long Island City waterfront

Long Island City was once home to many factories and bakeries, some of which are finding new uses. The former Silvercup bakery is now home to Silvercup Studios, which has produced notable works such as NBC's 30 Rock and HBO's Sex and the City and The Sopranos. The Silvercup sign is visible from the IRT Flushing Line and BMT Astoria Line trains going into and out of Queensboro Plaza (7, <7>, N and W trains). The former Sunshine Bakery is now one of the buildings which houses LaGuardia Community College. Other buildings on the campus originally served as the location of the Ford Instrument Company, which was at one time a major producer of precision machines and devices. Artist Isamu Noguchi converted a photo-engraving plant into a workshop; the site is now the Noguchi Museum, a space dedicated to his work.

The Standard Motor Products headquarters, a manufacturing site producing items like distributor caps, was once located in the industrial neighborhood of Long Island City until purchased by Acuman Partners in 2008 for $40 million. The Standard Motor Products Building was put on the market by Acuman in 2014 and acquired by RXR Realty, LLC for $110 million. The former factory built in 1919 now houses the Jim Henson Company, Society Awards, and a commercial rooftop farm run by Brooklyn Grange.

High-rise housing is being built on a former Pepsi-Cola site on the East River. From June 2002 to September 2004, the former Swingline Staplers plant was the temporary headquarters of the Museum of Modern Art. Other former factories in Long Island City include Fisher Electronics, Marantz and Chiclets Gum. Long Island City's turn-of-the-century district of residential towers, called Queens West, is located along the East River, just north of the LIRR's Long Island City Station. Redevelopment in Queens West reflects the intent to have the area as a major residential area in New York City, with its high-rise residences very close to public transportation, making it convenient for commuters to travel to Manhattan by ferry or subway. The first tower, the 42-floor Citylights, opened in 1998 with an elementary school at the base. Others have been completed since then and more are being planned or under construction.

Long Island City contains several of the tallest buildings in Queens. The 658-foot (201 m) One Court Square, formerly the Citicorp Building, was built in 1990 in Courthouse Square; it is currently the fourth tallest building in Queens and the fifth-tallest on Long Island, and was Queens' tallest building until 2019. The tallest building in the borough and second tallest on Long Island, the 811-foot (247 m) Orchard residential tower, was architecturally topped-out in July 2024. Yet another skyscraper, the 755-foot (230 m) tower named Sven, completed construction at Queens Plaza and became the third tallest building in the borough.

The Queensbridge Houses, a public-housing complex, comprises over 3,000 units, making it the largest such complex in North America.

Since 2005, part of the neighborhood has been maintained by the LIC Partnership as part of the Long Island City Business Improvement District. Initially, the business improvement district comprised 84 properties on either side of Queens Plaza. The BID was expanded in 2017 to cover several other major roads in Long Island City. The LIC Partnership requested in 2022 that the BID's size and budget be doubled, and the BID was again expanded in 2024.

=== Companies ===
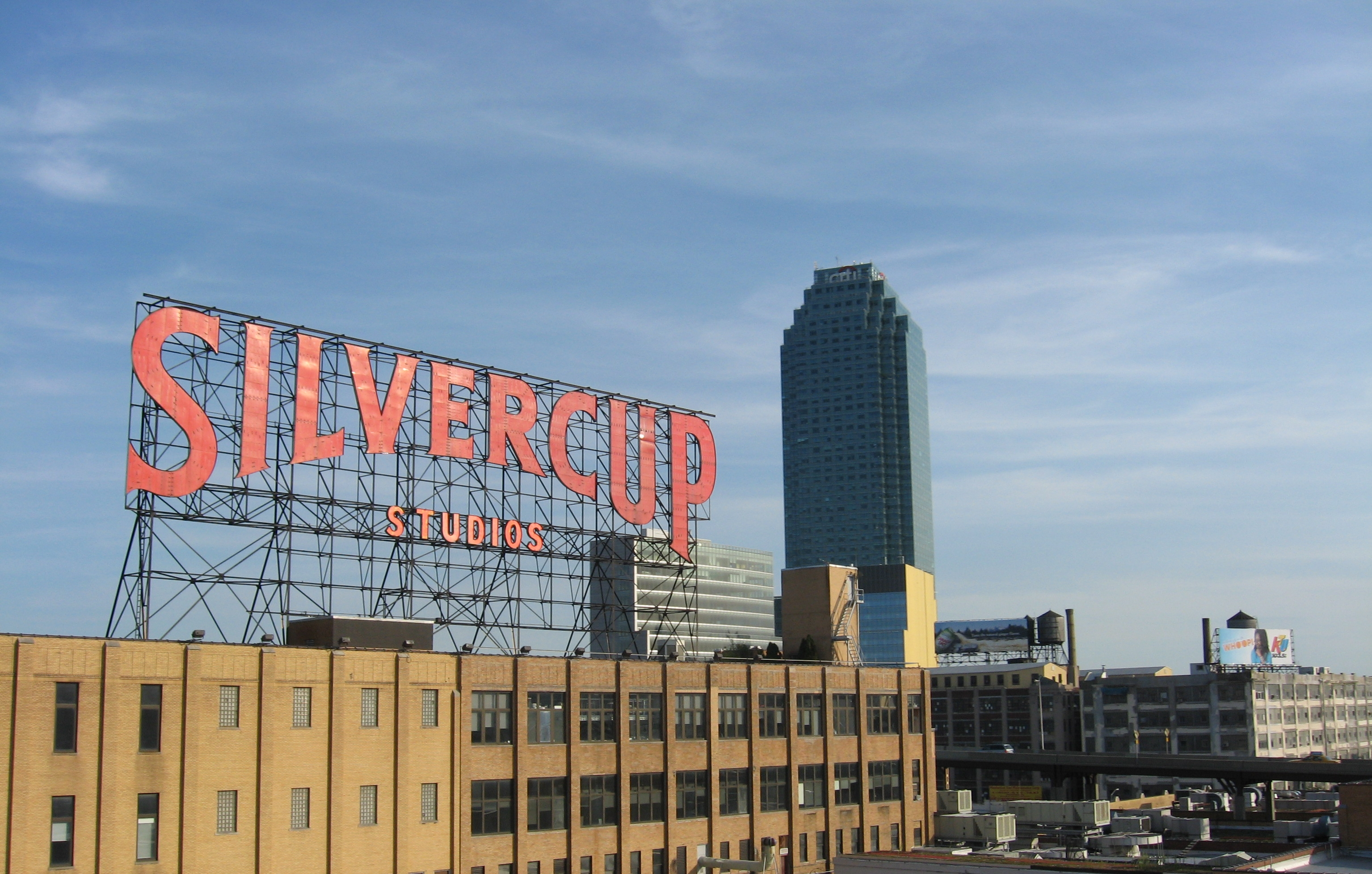
Citigroup Building and Silvercup Studios from the Queensboro Bridge

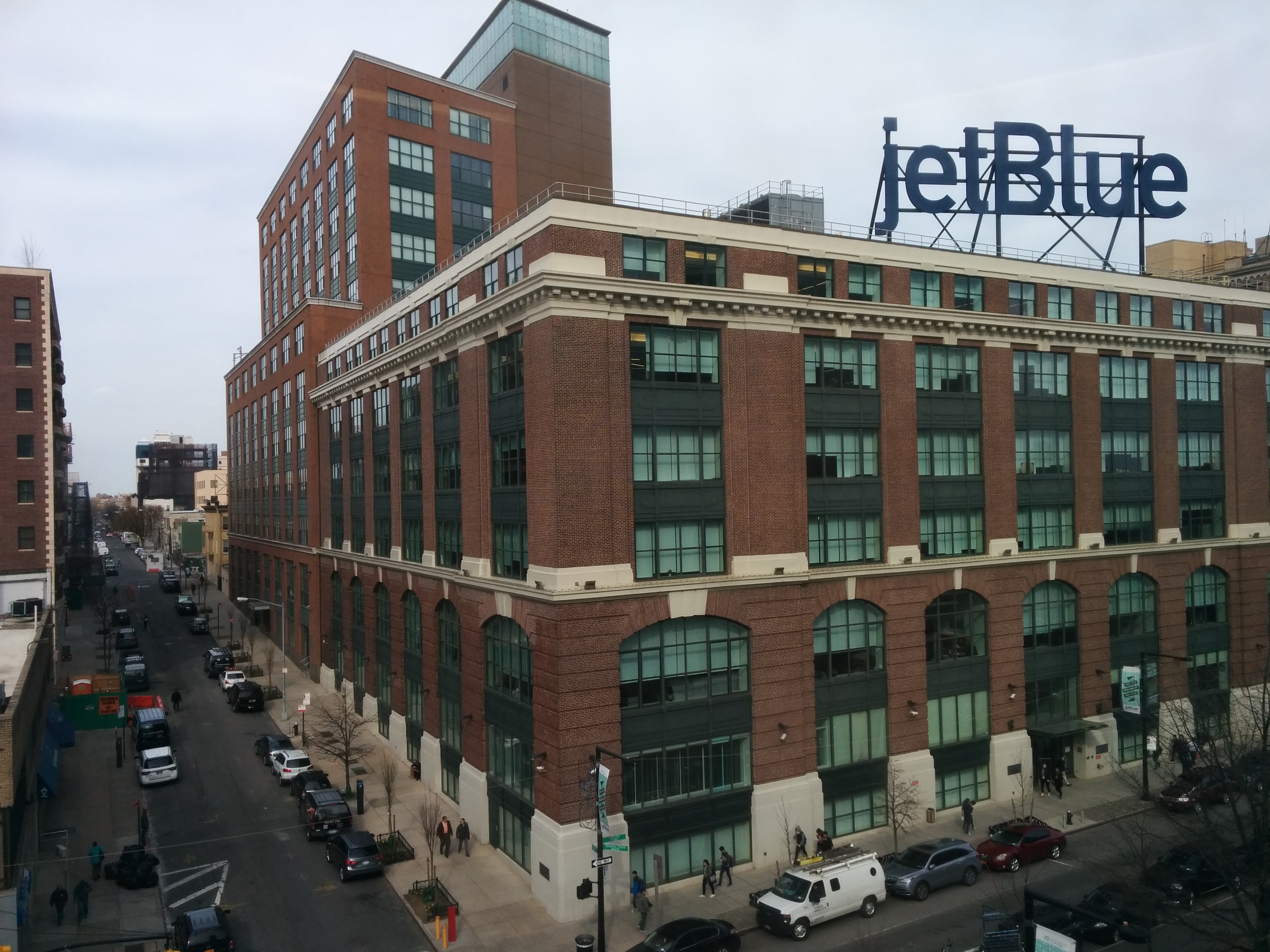
Brewster Building and the JetBlue headquarters as seen from Queensboro Plaza

Eagle Electric, now known as Cooper Wiring Devices, was one of the last major factories in the area, before it moved to China; Plant No. 7, which was the largest of their factories and housed their corporate offices, is being converted to residential luxury lofts.

Long Island City is currently home to the largest fortune cookie factory in the United States, owned by Wonton Foods and producing four million fortune cookies a day. Lucky numbers included on fortunes in the company's cookies led to 110 people across the United States winning $100,000 each in a May 2005 drawing for Powerball.

The Brooks Brothers tie manufacturing factory, which employs 122 people and produces more than 1.5 million ties per year, has operated in Long Island City since 1999.

Other companies headquartered in Long Island City include independent film studio Troma and Standard Motor Products.

In spring 2010, JetBlue Airways announced it was moving its headquarters from Forest Hills to Long Island City, also incorporating the jobs from its Darien, Connecticut, office. The airline, which operates its largest hub at JFK Airport, also operates from LaGuardia Airport, and made the Brewster Building in Queens Plaza its home. The airline moved there around mid-2012.

In November 2018, news media claimed that Amazon.com was in final talks with the government of New York State to construct one of two campuses for its proposed Amazon HQ2 at Queens West in Long Island City. The other campus would be located at National Landing in Crystal City, Virginia. Both campuses would have 25,000 workers. The selection was confirmed by Amazon on November 13, 2018. On February 14, 2019, Amazon announced it was pulling out, citing unexpected opposition from local lawmakers and unions.

== Subsections ==
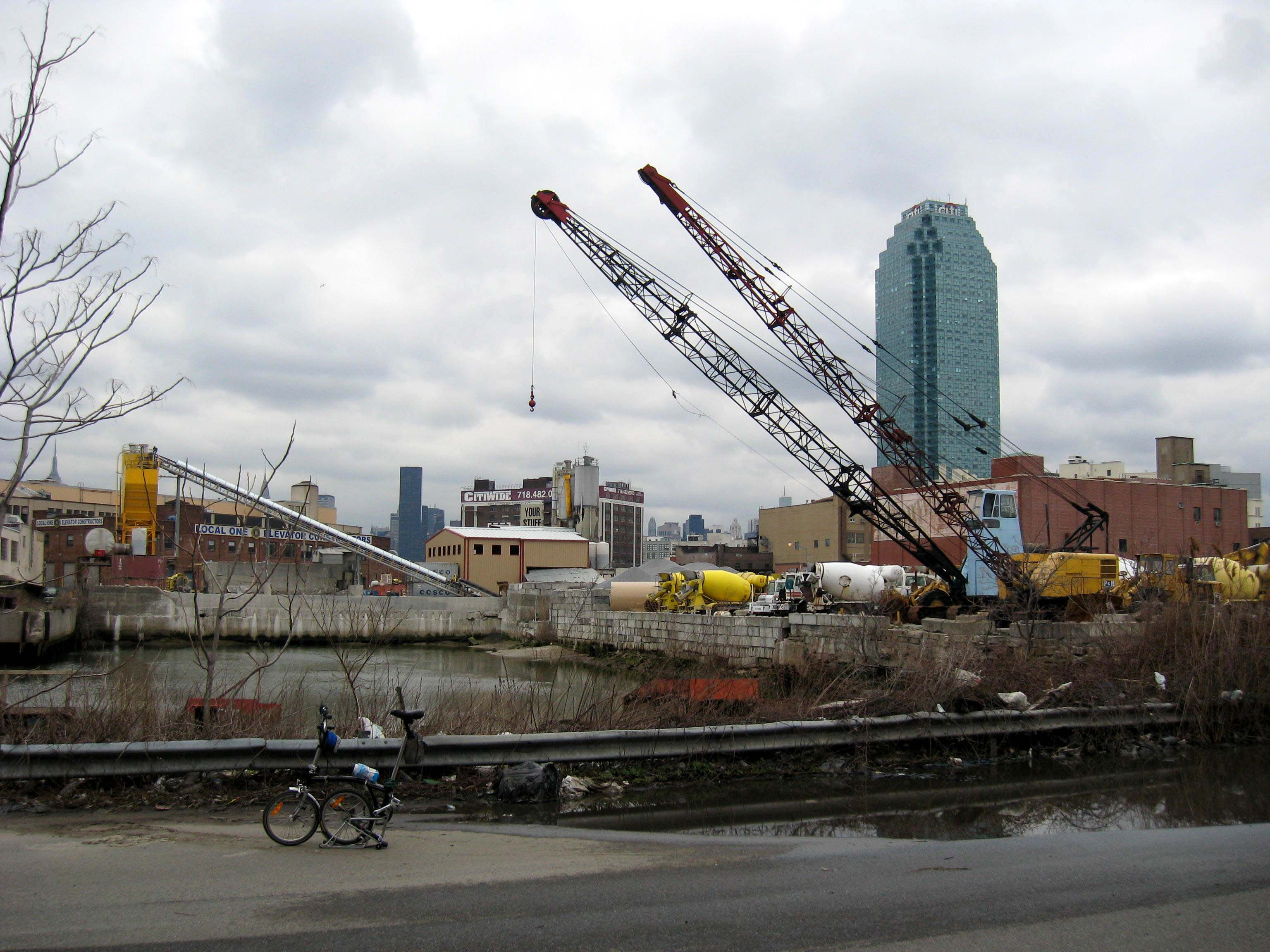
North end of canalized Dutch Kills

In 1870, the villages of Astoria, Ravenswood, Hunters Point, Dutch Kills, Middletown, Sunnyside, Blissville, and Bowery Bay were incorporated into Long Island City.

=== Dutch Kills ===
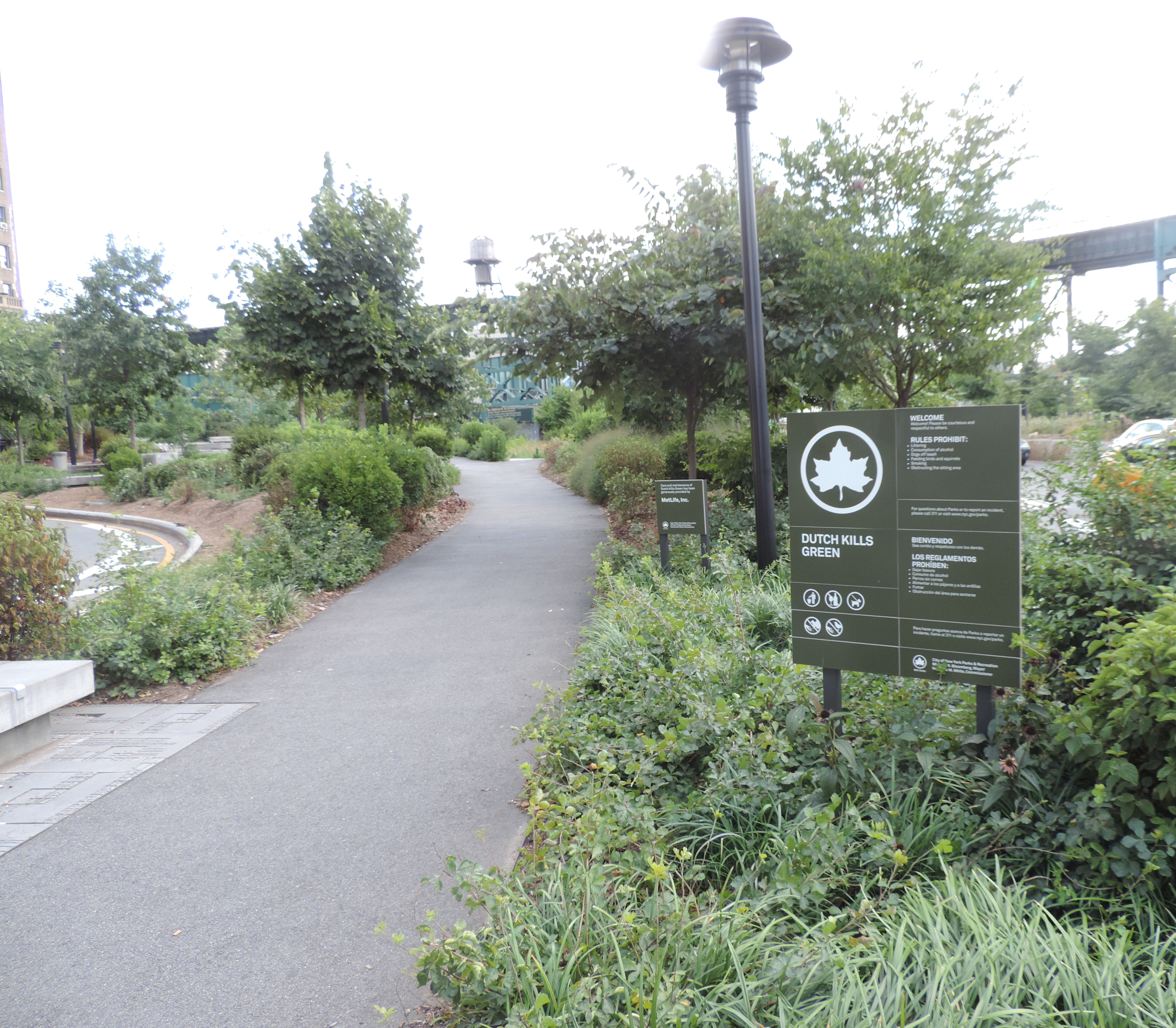
Dutch Kills Green, now part of Queens Plaza

Dutch Kills was a hamlet, named for its navigable tributary of Newtown Creek, that occupied what today is Queens Plaza. Dutch Kills was an important road hub during the American Revolutionary War, and the site of a British Army garrison from 1776 to 1783. The area supported farms during the 19th century. The tributary of the same name connected to Sunswick Creek at its north end, which facilitated commerce in the region. The canalization of Newtown Creek and the Kills at the end of the 19th century intensified industrial development of the area, which prospered until the middle of the 20th century. The neighborhood is currently undergoing a massive rezoning of mixed residential and commercial properties.

=== Blissville ===
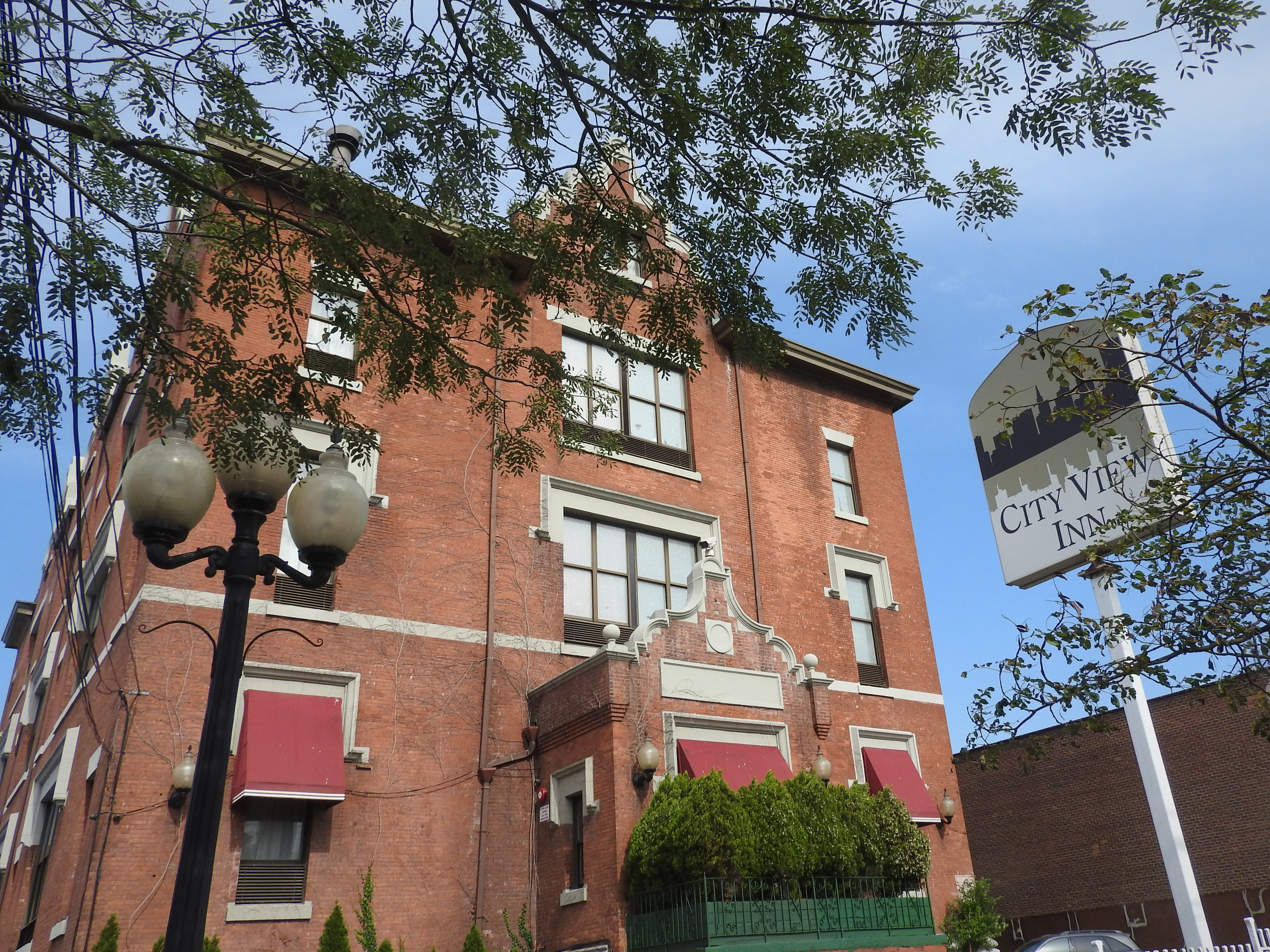
Hotel on Greenpoint Avenue in Blissville

Blissville, which has the ZIP Code 11101, is a neighborhood within Long Island City, located at 40°44′4.87″N 73°56′9.81″W and bordered by Calvary Cemetery to the east; the Long Island Expressway to the north; Newtown Creek to the south; and Dutch Kills, a tributary of Newtown Creek, to the west. Blissville was named after Neziah Bliss, who owned most of the land in the 1830s and 1840s. Bliss built the first version of what was known for many years as the Blissville Bridge, a drawbridge over Newtown Creek, connecting Greenpoint, Brooklyn and Blissville; it was replaced in the 20th century by the Greenpoint Avenue Bridge, also called the J. J. Byrne Memorial Bridge, located slightly upstream. Blissville existed as a small village until 1870 when it was incorporated into Long Island City. Historically an industrial neighborhood, it has The Blissville Veterans Memorial, a small park with a monument at the intersection of Greenpoint Avenue; Van Dam Street and Review Avenue.

=== Hunters Point ===
- Hunters Point Historic District
- U.S. National Register of Historic Places
- U.S. Historic district
- NYC Landmark
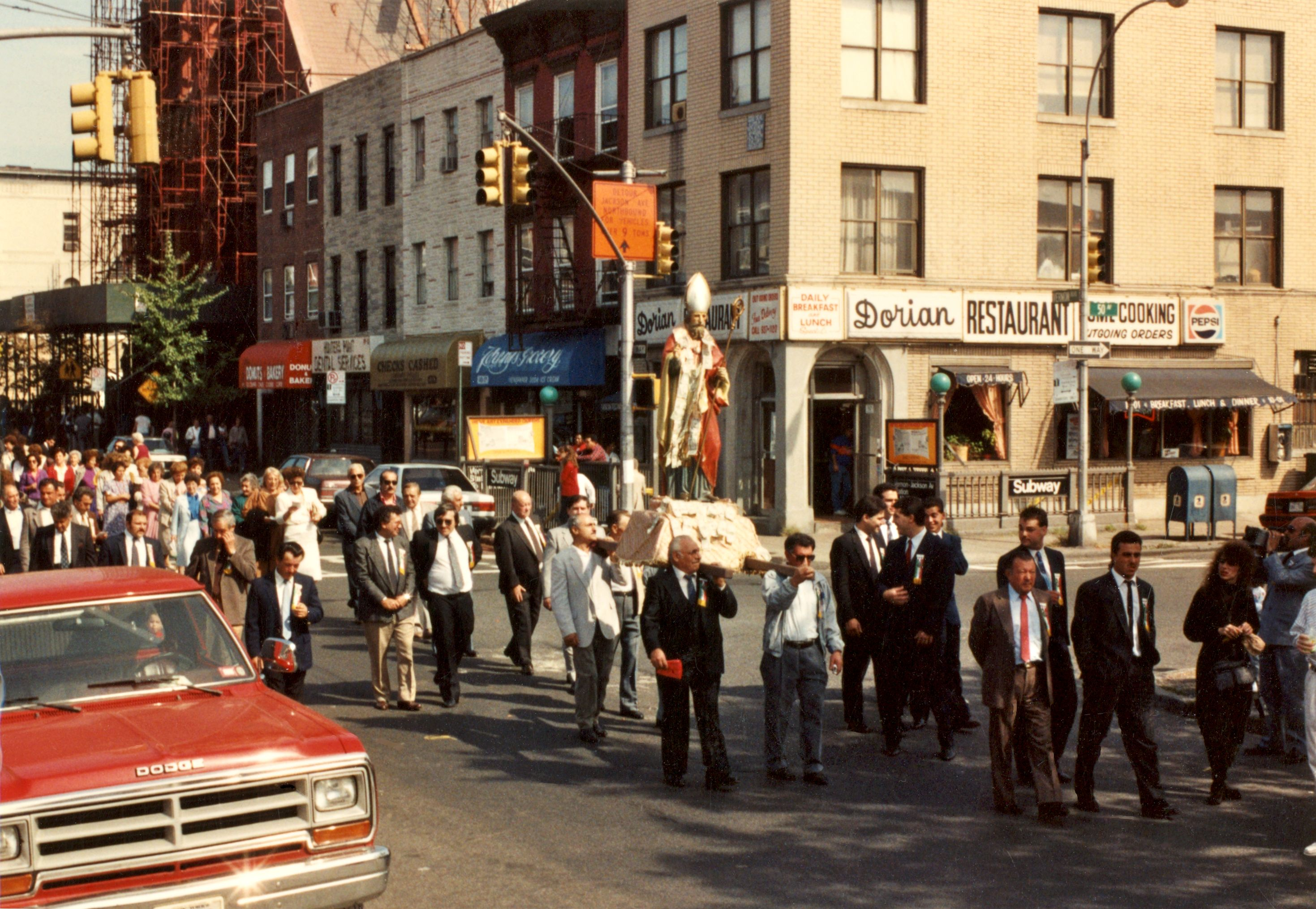
- Religious procession crossing 50th Avenue, 1989

- Location within New York City Location within New York Location within the United States
- Location: Along 45th Ave., between 21st and 23rd Sts., New York City
- Coordinates: 40°44′40.14″N 73°57′12.71″W
- Area: 1.5 acres (0.61 ha)
- Architect: Multiple
- Architectural style: Mixed (More Than 2 Styles From Different Periods)
- NRHP reference No.: 73001251
- NYCL No.: 0450

Significant dates
- Added to NRHP: September 19, 1973
- Designated NYCL: May 15, 1968

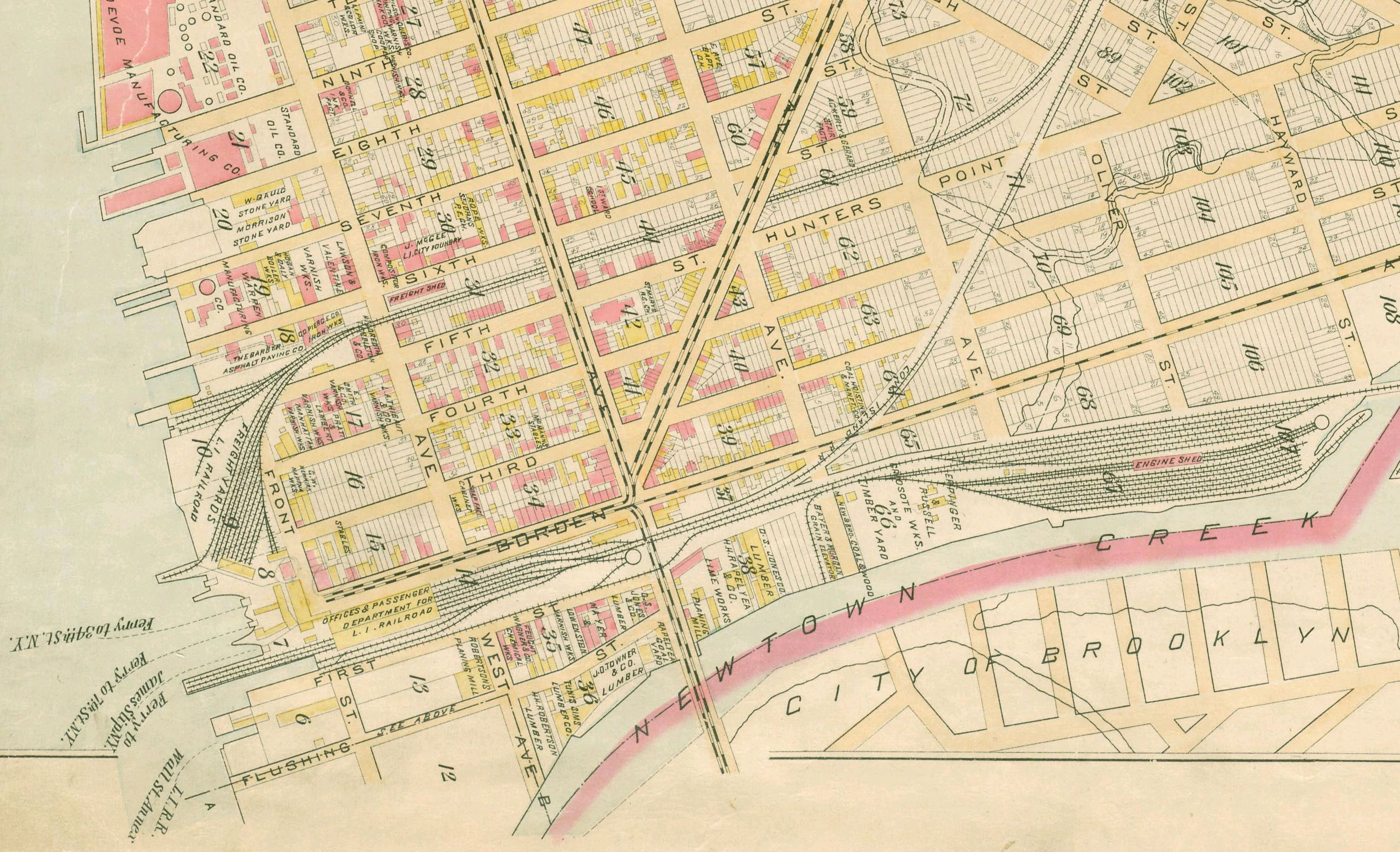
Map of industrial Hunters Point in 1891

Hunters Point is located on the south side of Long Island City, along Newtown Creek. The area took the name Hunters Point in 1825, named after British sea captain George Hunter whose family operated the site as a 210-acre farm.

It contains the Hunters Point Historic District, a national historic district that includes 19 contributing buildings along 45th Avenue between 21st and 23rd Streets. They are a set of townhouses built in the late 19th century. The historic district was created by the New York City Landmarks Preservation Commission in 1968, and was listed on the National Register of Historic Places in 1973.

The modern Queens West and Hunter's Point South developments are located on the East River waterfront.

== Arts and culture ==
Long Island City is home to a large number of Art Studios and dynamic artistic community.

- Long Island City was the home of 5 Pointz, a building housing artists' studios, which was legally painted on by a number of graffiti artists and was prominently visible near the Court Square station on the 7 and <7> trains. The 5 Pointz building was painted over and demolished by the property owner, starting in 2013. The owner was ordered to pay $6.75 million to artists as compensation. In 2021, a pair of connected rental towers dubbed 5Pointz opened.
- The Fisher Landau Center for Art is a private foundation that offers regular exhibitions of contemporary art that closed to the public in November 2017.
- Across the street from Socrates Sculpture Park is the Isamu Noguchi Foundation and Museum, founded in 1985 by Japanese-American sculptor Isamu Noguchi. After undergoing a two-and-a-half-year renovation completed at a cost of $13.5 million, the museum reopened in 2004 with newer and advanced facilities.
- MoMA PS1, an affiliate of the Museum of Modern Art, is the oldest and second-largest non-profit arts center in the United States solely devoted to contemporary art. It is named after the former public school in which it is housed.
- SculptureCenter is New York City's only non-profit exhibition space dedicated to contemporary and innovative sculpture. SculptureCenter re-located from Manhattan's Upper East Side to a former trolley repair shop in Long Island City, Queens renovated by artist/designer Maya Lin in 2002. Founded by artists in 1928, SculptureCenter has undergone much evolution and growth, and continues to expand and challenge the definition of sculpture. SculptureCenter commissions new work and presents exhibits by emerging and established, national and international artists. The museum also hosts a diverse range of public programs including lectures, dialogues, and performances.
- Socrates Sculpture Park is an outdoor sculpture park located one block from the Noguchi Museum at the intersection of Broadway and Vernon Boulevard.

== Police and crime ==
Woodside, Sunnyside, and Long Island City are patrolled by the 108th Precinct of the NYPD, located at 5-47 50th Avenue. The 108th Precinct ranked 25th safest out of 69 patrol areas for per-capita crime in 2010. As of 2018, with a non-fatal assault rate of 19 per 100,000 people, Sunnyside and Woodside's rate of violent crimes per capita is less than that of the city as a whole. The incarceration rate of 163 per 100,000 people is lower than that of the city as a whole.

The 108th Precinct has a lower crime rate than in the 1990s, with crimes across all categories having decreased by 88.2% between 1990 and 2018. The precinct reported 2 murders, 12 rapes, 90 robberies, 108 felony assaults, 109 burglaries, 490 grand larcenies, and 114 grand larcenies auto in 2018.

== Fire safety ==
Long Island City is served by the following New York City Fire Department (FDNY) fire stations:

- Engine Company 258/Ladder Company 115 – 10-40 47th Avenue
- Engine Company 259/Ladder Company 128/Battalion 45 – 33-51 Greenpoint Avenue

Formerly, Engine Company 261/Ladder Company 116 was located at 37-20 29th Street, until it was closed in 2003 as a cost-saving measure.

== Health ==
As of 2018, preterm births are more common in southern Long Island City than in other places citywide, but are less common in northern Long Island City; births to teenage mothers are less common than citywide in both areas. In northern Long Island City, there were 84 preterm births per 1,000 live births (compared to 87 per 1,000 citywide), and 15.1 births to teenage mothers per 1,000 live births (compared to 19.3 per 1,000 citywide). In southern Long Island City, there were 90 preterm births per 1,000 live births, and 14.9 births to teenage mothers per 1,000 live births. Long Island City has a high population of residents who are uninsured. In 2018, this population of uninsured residents was estimated to be 12% in Community Board 1 and 16% in Community Board 2, compared to the citywide rate of 12%.

The concentration of fine particulate matter, the deadliest type of air pollutant, is 0.0078 milligrams per cubic metre (7.8×10^{−9} oz/ft^{3}) in northern Long Island City and 0.0093 milligrams per cubic metre (9.3×10^{−9} oz/ft^{3}) in southern Long Island City. Nineteen percent of Community Board 1 residents and fourteen percent of Community Board 2 residents are smokers, compared to the city average of 14% of residents being smokers. In Community Board 1, 19% of residents are obese, 11% are diabetic, and 29% have high blood pressure—compared to the citywide averages of 24%, 11%, and 28% respectively. In Community Board 2, 20% of residents are obese, 9% are diabetic, and 23% have high blood pressure. In addition, 22% of children in northern Long Island City and 19% of children in southern Long Island City are obese, compared to the citywide average of 20%.

Eighty-nine percent of Community Board 1 residents and ninety-two percent of Community Board 2 residents eat some fruits and vegetables every day, which is higher than the city's average of 87%. In 2018, 79% of residents in both areas described their health as "good", "very good", or "excellent", slightly higher than the city's average of 78%. For every supermarket, there are 17 bodegas in southern Long Island City and 10 in northern Long Island City.

The nearest large hospitals in the area are the Elmhurst Hospital Center in Elmhurst and the Mount Sinai Hospital of Queens in Astoria.

== Post office and ZIP Code ==
Long Island City is covered by ZIP Code 11101. The United States Post Office operates the Long Island City Station at 46-02 21st Street.

== Education ==
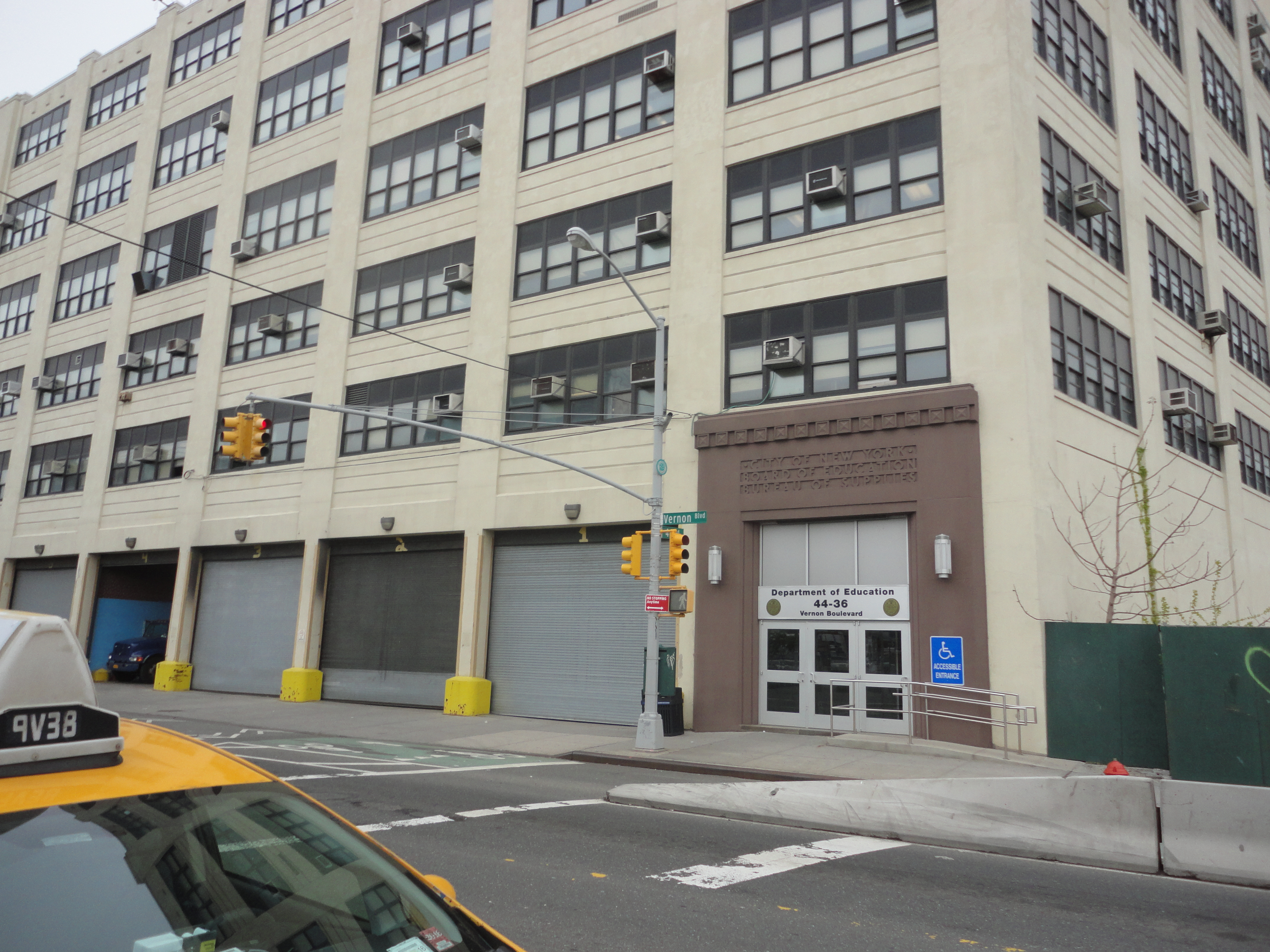
Department of Education building at 44-36 Vernon Blvd

Long Island City generally has a slightly higher ratio of college-educated residents than the rest of the city as of 2018. In Community Board 1, half of residents (50%) have a college education or higher, while 16% have less than a high school education and 33% are high school graduates or have some college education. In Community Board 2, 45% of residents age 25 and older have a college education or higher, 19% have less than a high school education and 35% are high school graduates or have some college education. By contrast, 39% of Queens residents and 43% of city residents have a college education or higher. The percentage of Community Board 1 students excelling in math rose from 43% in 2000 to 65 percent in 2011, and reading achievement rose from 47% to 49% during the same time period. Similarly, the percentage of Community Board 2 students excelling in math rose from 40% in to 65%, and reading achievement rose from 45% to 49%, during the same time period.

Long Island City's rate of elementary school student absenteeism is about equal to the rest of New York City. Nineteen percent of elementary school students in Community Board 1 and 11% in Community Board 2 missed twenty or more days per school year, less than the citywide average of 20%. Additionally, 78% of high school students in Community Board 1 and 86% of high school students in Community Board 2 graduate on time, more than the citywide average of 75%.

The New York City Department of Education operates a facility in Long Island City housing the Office of School Support Services and several related departments.

=== Schools ===
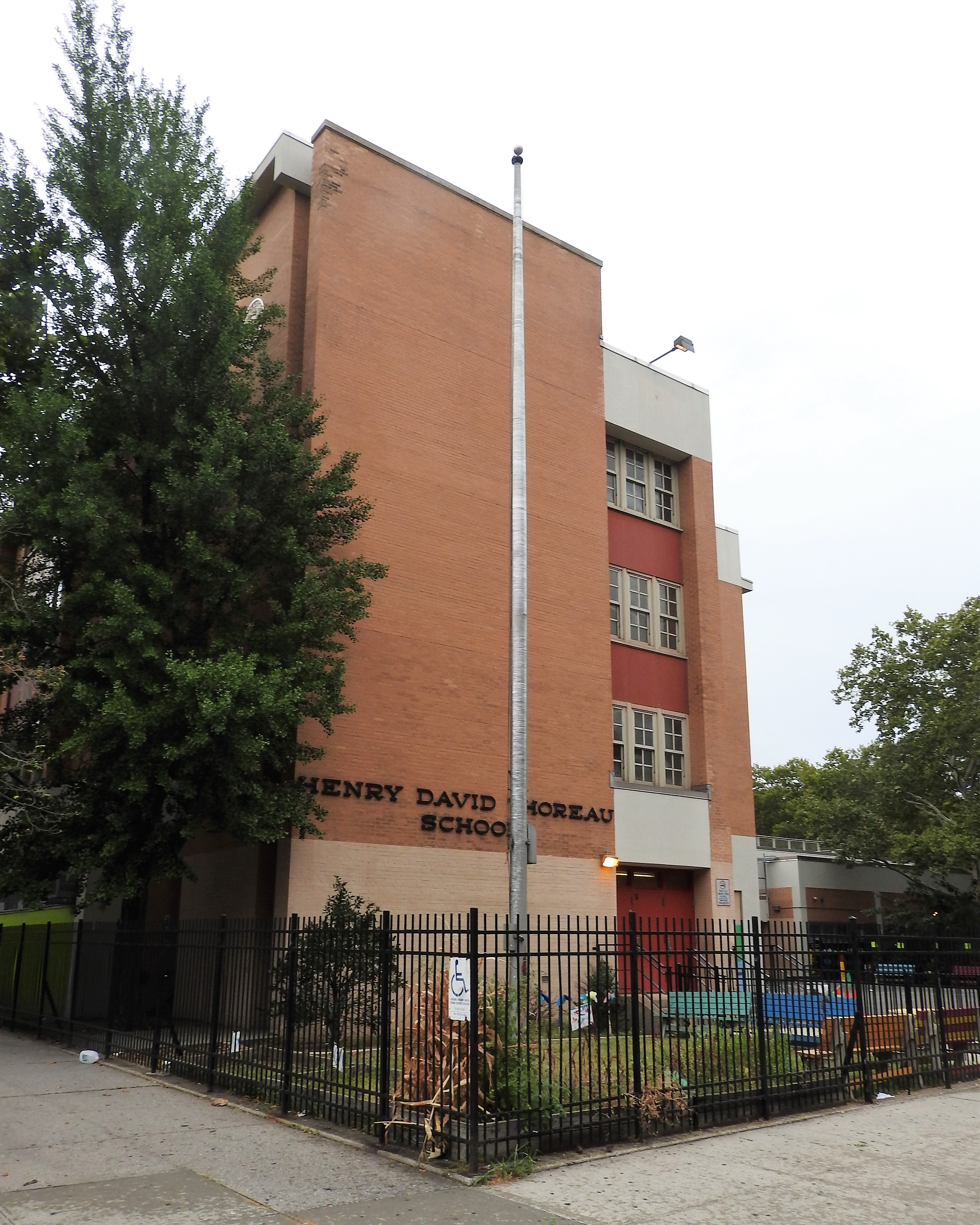
PS 17

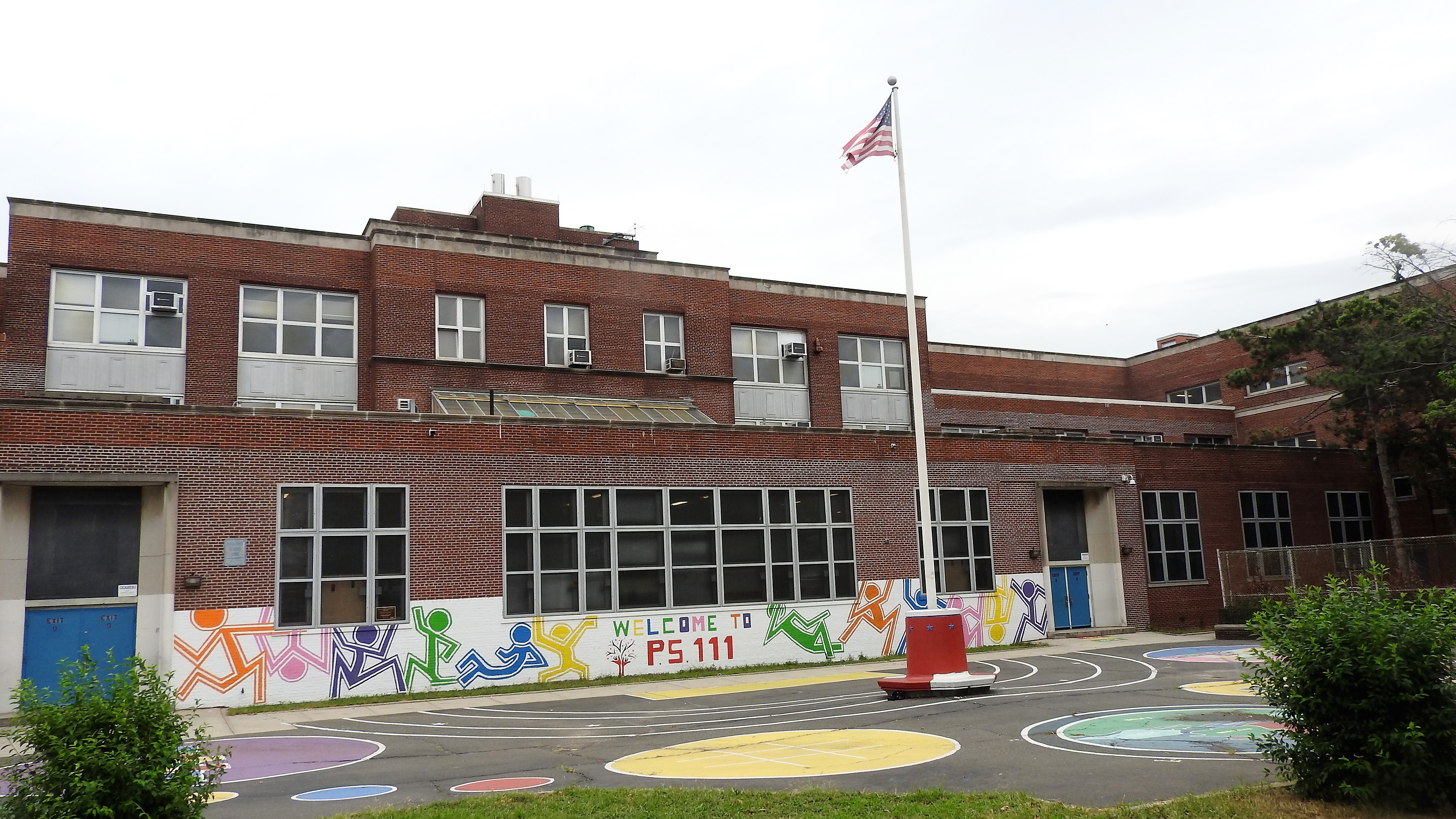
PS 111

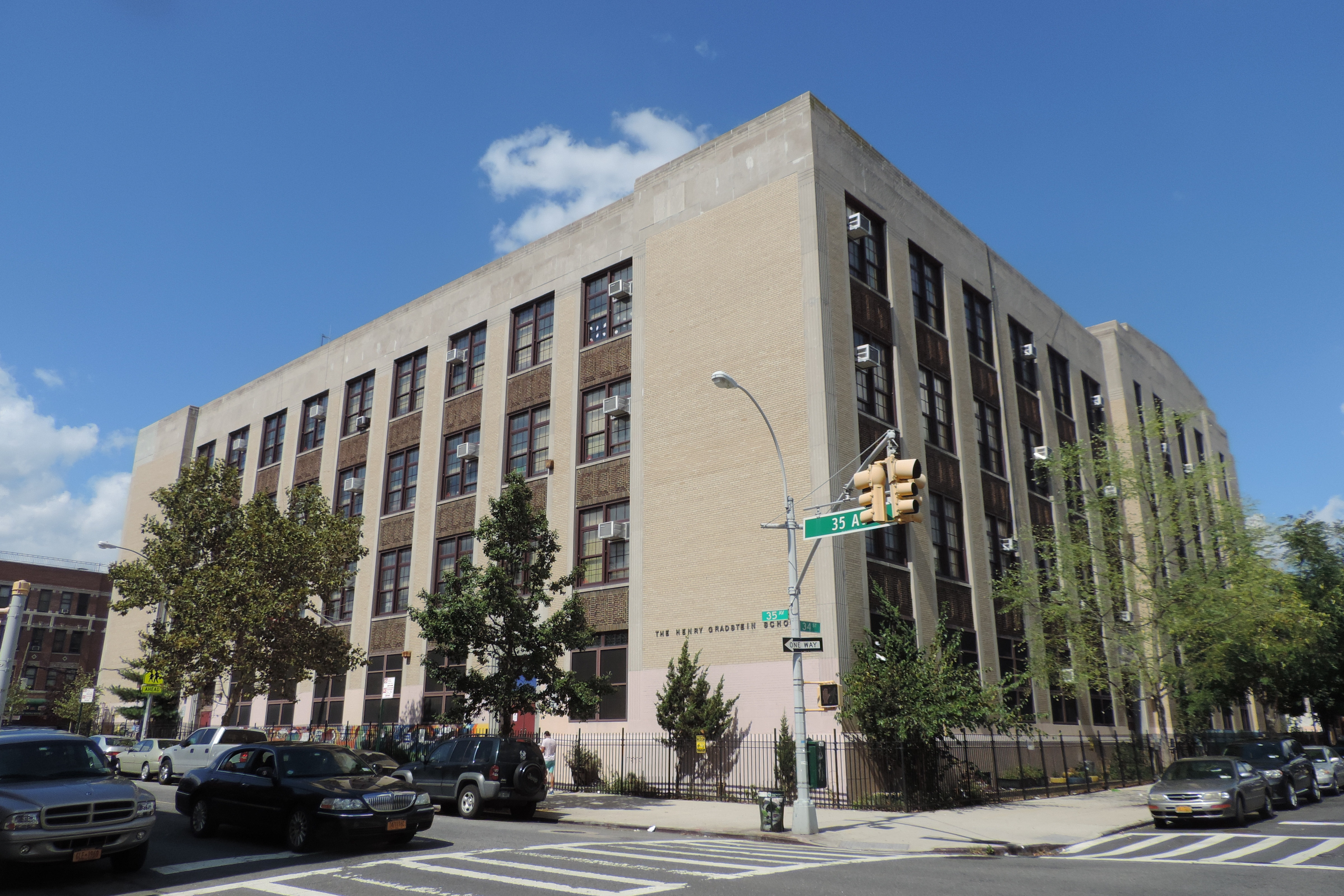
PS 166, the Gradstein School

==== K-12 ====
Long Island City is served by the New York City Department of Education. Long Island City is zoned to:

- PS 17 Henry David Thoreau School
- PS 70
- PS 76 William Hallet School
- PS/IS 78Q
- PS 85 Judge Charles Vallone
- PS 111 Jacob Blackwell School
- PS 112 Dutch Kills School
- PS 150
- PS 166 Henry Gradstein School
- PS 171 Peter G. Van Alst School
- PS 199 Maurice A. Fitzgerald School
- PS 384 Hunters Point Elementary
- IS 10 Horace Greeley School
- IS 126 Albert Shanker School For Visual And Performing Arts
- IS 141 The Steinway School
- IS 204 Oliver W. Holmes
- IS 291 Hunter's Point Community Middle School

Additionally, Long Island City is home to:

- Baccalaureate School for Global Education, a 7–12 school
- Gantry View School, an independent school that offers rigorous, enriched learning and group activities for its mixed-age student body, K-5
- St. Raphael School's campus

==== High schools offering specializations ====
Long Island City is home to numerous high schools, some of which offer specializations, as indicated below. These specialized schools are not to be confused with the elite specialized high schools. Rather, these schools offer programs that are included at specialized high schools.

- Academy of American Studies (Q575), a history high school
- Academy for Careers in Television & Film (Q301)
- Academy of Finance and Enterprise (Q264)
- Aviation Career and Technical High School (Q610)
- Bard High School Early College II (Q299)
- Frank Sinatra School of the Arts (Q501)
- High School of Applied Communication (Q267)
- Information Technology High School (Q502)
- The International High School (Queens) at LaGuardia Community College (Q530)
- Long Island City High School (Q450)
- Middle College High School at LaGuardia Community College (Q520)
- Newcomers High School - Academy for New Americans (Q555)
- Queens Vocational and Technical High School (Q600)
- Robert F. Wagner Jr. Institute For Arts & Technology (Q560)
- William Cullen Bryant High School (Q445)

=== Higher education ===
Numerous institutions of higher education have (or have had) a presence in Long Island City.

- Briarcliffe College has a campus on Thomson Avenue.
- City University of New York School of Law is located at 2 Court Square.
- Columbia University's Depression Project is located at 3718 34th Street.
- DeVry University – New York Metro (also known as DeVry College of New York), maintained headquarters at 3020 Thomson Avenue until March 2011, at which time New York Metro's main campus relocated to 180 Madison Avenue in Manhattan, and DCNY relocated its Queens presence to 99–21 Queens Boulevard in Rego Park
- LaGuardia Community College is located at 3110 Thomson Avenue.
- Middle College National Consortium is located at 27–28 Thomson Avenue, #331
- Touro College is located at 2511 49th Avenue.
- Calvary Chapel Bible College New York City is located at 31-10 47th Street.

=== Libraries ===
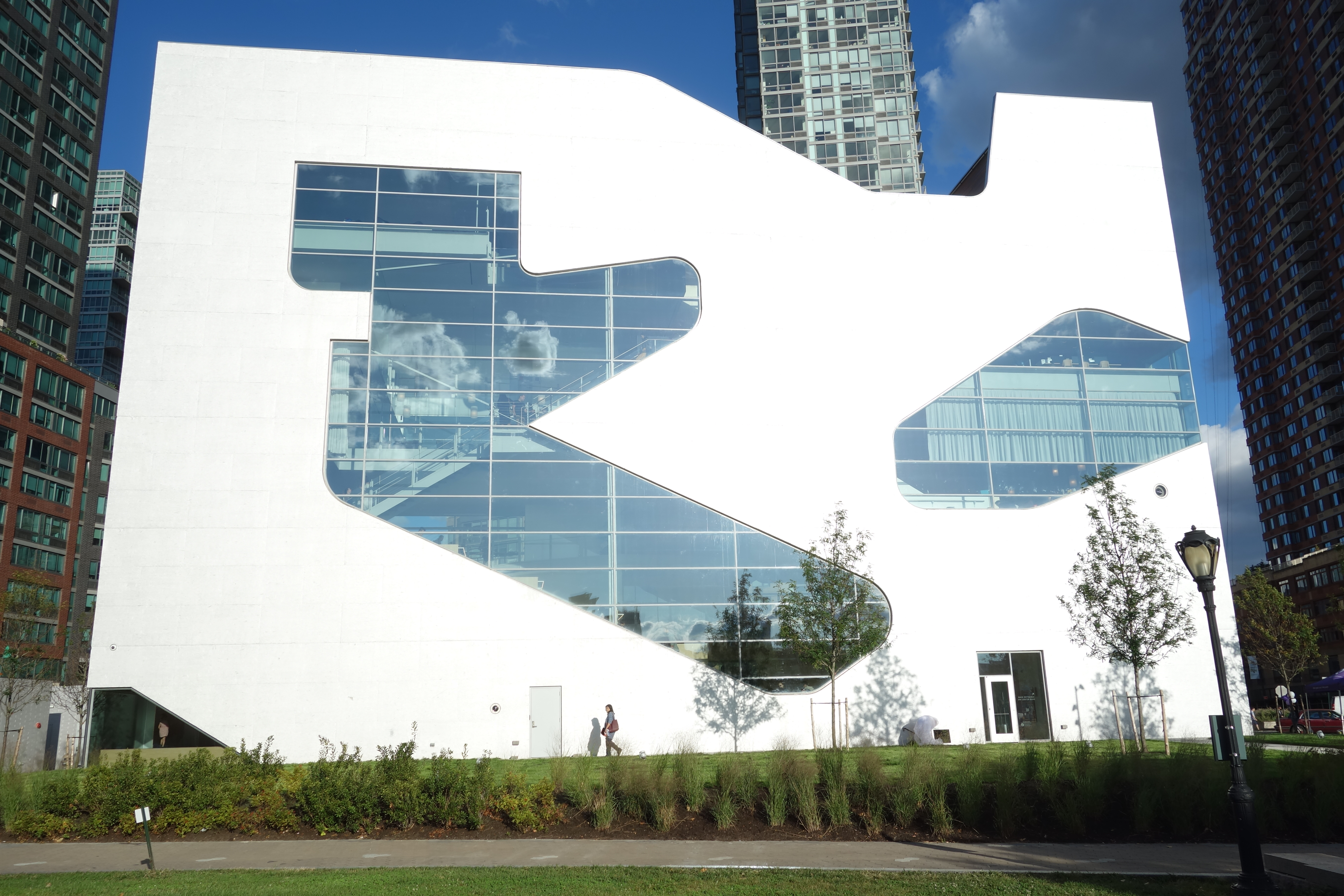
Exterior of the Hunters Point Library

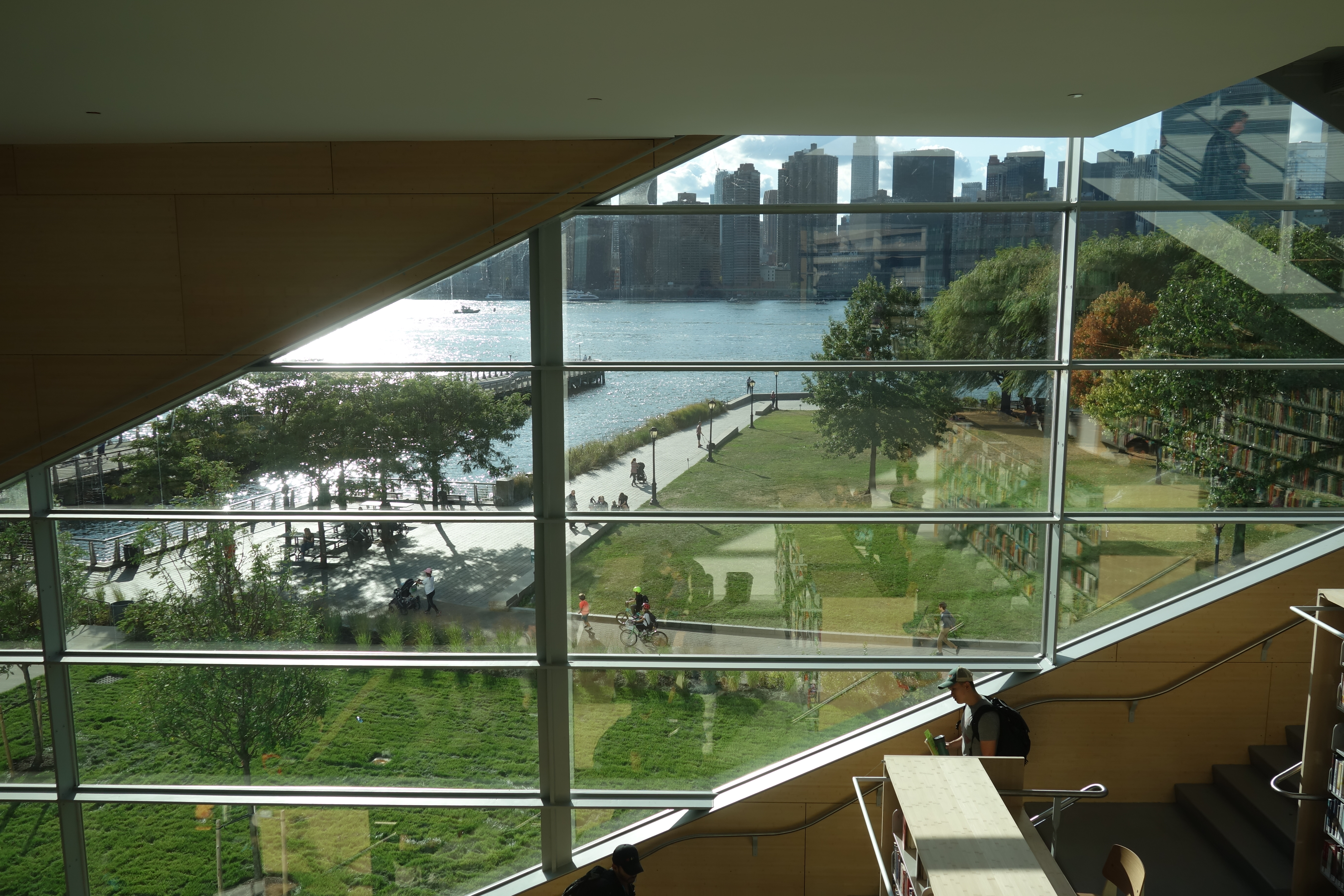
Interior of the Hunters Point Library

The Queens Public Library operates two branches in Long Island City. The Hunters Point Community Library is located at 47-40 Center Boulevard on the bank of the East River. Designed by Steven Holl Architects in 2010 and opened on September 24, 2019, the library has a floor area of 22,000 ft^{2} (2,000 m^{2}) and is 82 feet (25 m) tall, measuring 168 feet (51 m) along the New York City waterfront. Features include an art installation by Julianne Swartz, designer furniture by Eames and Jean Prouvé, and a reading garden surrounded by ginkgo trees and designed by Michael Van Valkenburgh. The branch cost $40 million to construct because the site had to undergo pollution remediation, since it was previously used by a factory that processed asphalt and other bituminous products. The Hunters Point Library includes over 50,000 books with Spanish and Chinese language collections, as well as an environmental education center, a section for young children, and a teenagers' space equipped with a video game area. Though the building is compliant with the Americans with Disabilities Act of 1990, its stepped terraces and single elevator have been criticized for being inaccessible to the disabled. The fourth floor where the cyber center is has a curved wooden element in the design of the interior atrium.

The Long Island City branch is located at 37-44 21st Street.

A third branch, the Court Square branch, opened in 1989 and was located on the ground floor of One Court Square. One Court Square's former owner, Citigroup, leased the space to the library for $1 per month. After the tower's new owner Savanna failed to renew the Court Square branch's lease, the location was closed in February 2020, and the branch would either move to a new location or be closed permanently. A mobile branch opened nearby, and Queens Public Library agreed in 2024 to open a new branch at the 5 Pointz development.

== Parks and recreation ==
There are several waterfront parks in Long Island City. These include or have included:

- Gantry Plaza State Park, a 12-acre (4.9 ha) park on the East River waterfront between Anable Basin to the north and 50th Avenue to the south
- Hunters Point South Park, a 10-acre (4.0 ha) park on the East River waterfront at Hunter's Point South, near Newtown Creek
- Malt Drive Park, a 3.5-acre (1.4 ha) park just south of Hunters Point South Park. The park includes native plantings, and it slopes down from the neighboring buildings toward Newtown Creek.
- Queensbridge Park, a park on the East River waterfront north of Queensboro Bridge, within the Queensbridge Houses
- Water Taxi Beach was New York City's first non-swimming urban beach, and was located on the East River in Long Island City. City Hall planned to build 5,000 moderate income apartments in this area, a 30-acre (12 ha) development called Hunter's Point South. The beach later closed and the apartments have been constructed.

Other parks include:

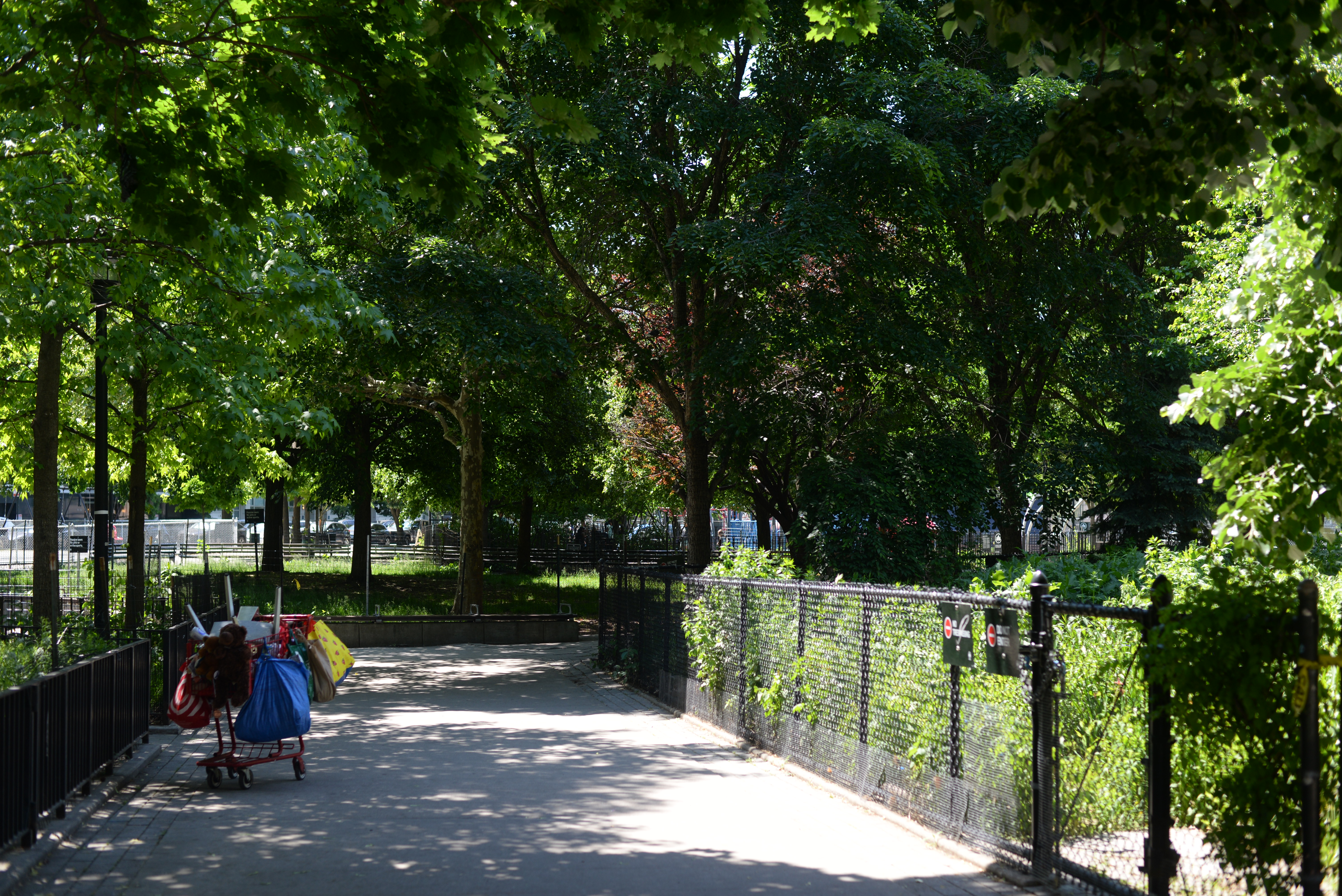
Murray Park

- Andrews Grove, on 49th Avenue between Fifth Street and Vernon Boulevard
- Bridge and Tunnel Park, between the Pulaski Bridge, 50th Avenue, 11th Place, and the Queens–Midtown Tunnel entrance ramp
- City Ice Pavilion, with 33,000 square feet (3,100 m^{2}) of skating surface, opened in Long Island City in late 2008. The ice skating rink is on the roof of a two-story storage facility.
- Hunters Point Community Park, a 600-by-60-foot (183 by 18 m) linear park located on the south side of 48th Avenue between Fifth Street and Vernon Boulevard
- Murray Playground, between 45th Avenue, 45th Road, and 11th and 21st Streets
- Old Hickory Playground, at Jackson Avenue and 51st Avenue

== Transportation ==
=== Public transportation ===
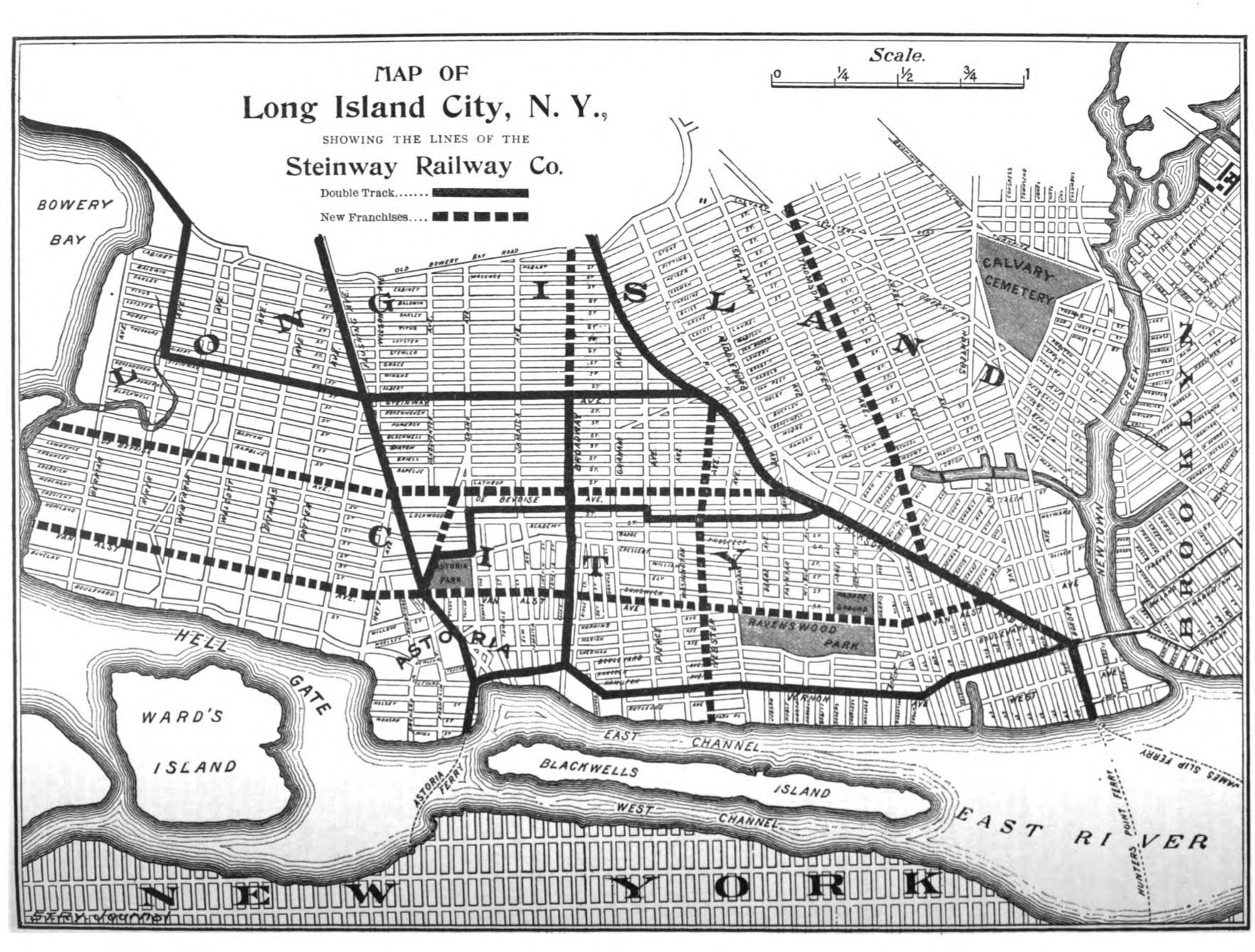
Long Island City Steinway Railway Company c 1894

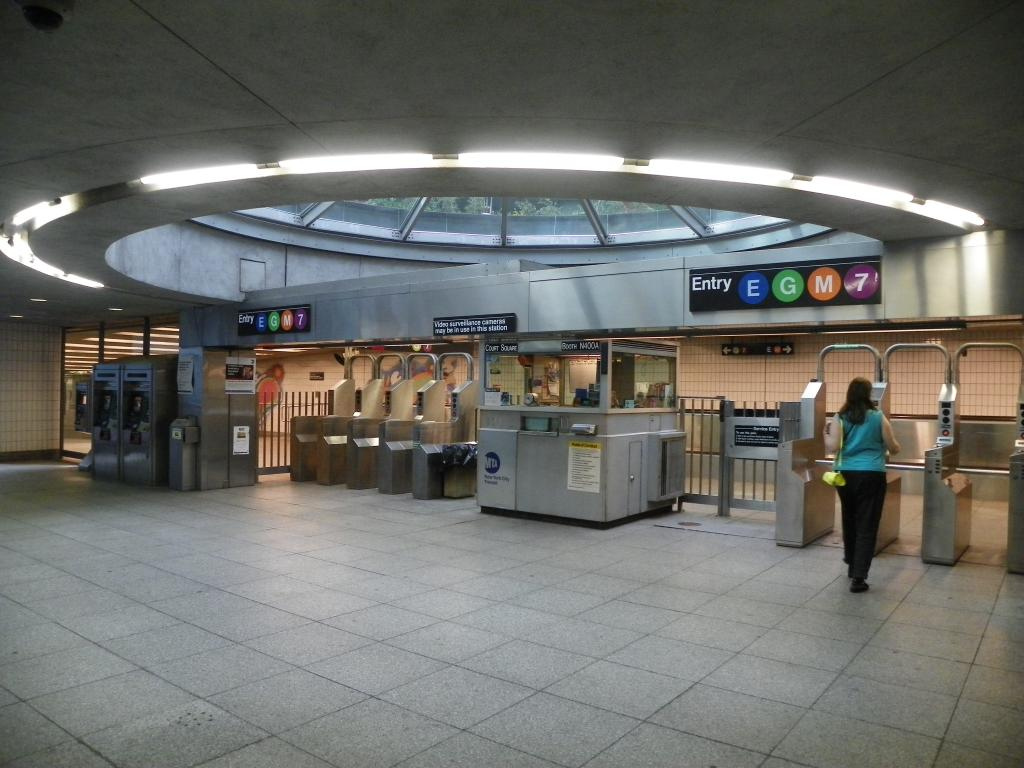
Entrance to Court Square-23rd Street

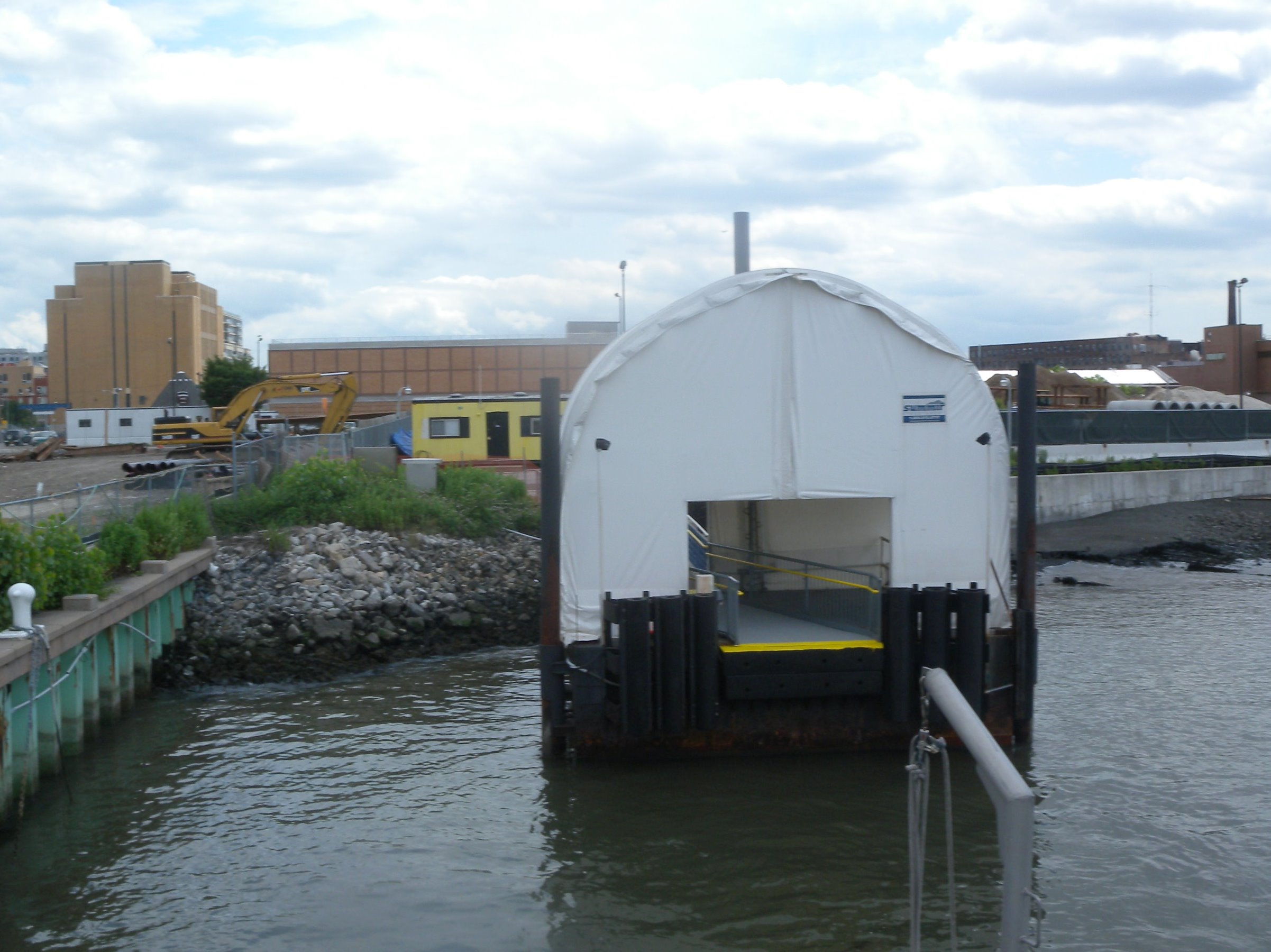
Ferry dock

The following New York City Subway stations serve Long Island City:

- 21st Street–Queensbridge (F and M trains)
- 21st Street (G train)
- 39th Avenue (N and W trains)
- Court Square–23rd Street (7, <7>, E, F, <F>, and G trains)
- Hunters Point Avenue (7 and <7> trains)
- Queens Plaza (E, F, <F>, and R trains)
- Queensboro Plaza (7, <7>, N and W trains)
- Vernon Boulevard–Jackson Avenue (7 and <7> trains)

The following MTA Regional Bus Operations bus routes serve Long Island City:

- Q32: to Pennsylvania Station (Manhattan) or Jackson Heights via Queens Plaza and Queens Boulevard
- Q39: to Glendale via Thomson Avenue
- Q60: to East Midtown (Manhattan) or Jamaica via Queens Plaza and Queens Boulevard
- Q63 and Q66: to Flushing–Main Street (7 and <7> trains) via 21st Street
- Q67: to Middle Village via Borden Avenue
- Q69: to East Elmhurst via 21st Street
- Q100: to Rikers Island (Bronx) via 21st Street
- Q101: to Hunters Point or Steinway via Queens Plaza and Northern Boulevard
- Q102: to Roosevelt Island (Manhattan) or Court Square
- Q103: to Astoria or Hunters Point via Vernon Boulevard
- B32: to Williamsburg Bridge Plaza Bus Terminal via 11th/21st Streets
- B62: to Downtown Brooklyn or Astoria

The Long Island City and Hunterspoint Avenue stations of the Long Island Rail Road (LIRR) are also located within Long Island City. The US$11.1 billion East Side Access project, which brought LIRR trains to Grand Central Terminal in Manhattan, opened in 2023; this project created a new train tunnel beneath the East River, connecting Long Island City and Queens with the East Side of Manhattan.

During the summer, the New York Water Taxi Company used to operate Water Taxi Beach, a public beach artificially created on a wharf along the East River, accessible at the corner of Second Street and Borden Avenue. It was discontinued in 2011 due to new construction on the site of the old landing.

In June 2011, NY Waterway started service to points along the East River. On May 1, 2017, that route became part of the NYC Ferry's East River route, which runs between Pier 11/Wall Street in Manhattan's Financial District and the East 34th Street Ferry Landing in Murray Hill, Manhattan, with five intermediate stops in Brooklyn and Queens. One NYC Ferry stop for the East River route is located at Hunters Point South, while another NYC Ferry stop for a route to Astoria is located at Gantry Plaza State Park.

There are plans to build the Brooklyn–Queens Connector (BQX), a light rail system that would run along the waterfront from Red Hook in Brooklyn through Long Island City to Astoria. However, the system is projected to cost $2.7 billion, and the projected opening has been delayed until at least 2029.

=== Road ===
Cars enter from Brooklyn by the Pulaski Bridge from Brooklyn; from Manhattan by the Queensboro Bridge and the Queens–Midtown Tunnel; and from Roosevelt Island by the Roosevelt Island Bridge. Major thoroughfares include 21st Street, which is mostly industrial and commercial; I-495 (Long Island Expressway); the westernmost portion of Northern Boulevard (New York State Route 25A), which becomes Jackson Avenue (the former name of Northern Boulevard) south of Queens Plaza; and Queens Boulevard, which leads westward to the bridge and eastward follows New York State Route 25 through Long Island; and Vernon Boulevard.

== Notable people ==
Seven Major League Baseball players were born in Long Island City (LIC), and two have died there:

- Joe Benes (1901–1975, born in LIC)
- Ed Boland (1908–1993, born in LIC)
- Al Cuccinello (1914–2004, born in LIC)
- Tony Cuccinello (1907–1995, born in LIC)
- John Hatfield (1847–1909, died in LIC)
- Billy Loes (1929–2010), right-handed pitcher who spent eleven seasons in Major League Baseball with the Brooklyn Dodgers, Baltimore Orioles and San Francisco Giants.
- Gus Sandberg (1895–1930, born in LIC)
- Dike Varney (1880–1950, died in LIC)
- Billy Zitzmann (1895–1985, born in LIC)

People raised in the Queensbridge Houses include hip-hop producer Marley Marl, and rappers MC Shan, Mobb Deep, Nas, and Roxanne Shante.

Other notable residents of Long Island City include:

- Mike Baxter (born 1984), outfielder who played for the New York Mets.
- Richard Bellamy (1927–1998), art dealer.
- Jane Bolin (1908–2007), first black woman to serve as a judge in the United States when she was sworn into the bench of the New York City Domestic Relations Court in 1939.
- Sonam Dolma Brauen (born 1953), Swiss-Tibetan sculptor and painter
- Mario J. Cariello (1907–1985), politician who served as Borough President of Queens and as a New York Supreme Court Justice.
- Richard Christy (born 1974), musician and writer on The Howard Stern Show
- John T. Clancy (1903–1985), lawyer, politician and surrogate judge from Queens.
- Julie Dash (born 1952), filmmaker
- Florence Finney (1903–1994), politician and first woman president pro tempore of the Connecticut State Senate; born in Long Island City.
- Vern Fleming (born 1962), former professional basketball player who played in the NBA for the Indiana Pacers and New Jersey Nets
- John J. Flemm (1896–1974), politician, founder and president of Flemm Lead Company
- Roy Gussow (1918–2011), abstract sculptor
- Steve Hofstetter (born 1979), actor and comedian; operates the Laughing Devil Comedy Club in the area
- Zenon Konopka (born 1981), ice hockey forward; lived in Long Island City during the 2010–11 NHL season
- Murray Lerner (1927–2017), documentary and experimental film director and producer.
- Blanche Merrill (1883–1966), songwriter
- Mollie Moon (1912–1990), founder and president of the National Urban League Guild
- Natalia Paruz, musician and director of the annual NYC Musical Saw Festival
- Naomi Rosenblum (1925–2021), photography historian.
- Levy Rozman (born 1995), chess International Master, chess coach and online content creator
- Metta Sandiford-Artest (born 1979), former professional basketball player who played 19 seasons in the NBA
- Joe Santagato (born 1992), comedian and creator of Hasbro board game Speak Out.
- Jessica Valenti (born 1978), feminist writer, founder of the website Feministing and columnist for The Guardian
- Andy Walker (born 1955), retired professional basketball small forward who spent one season in the NBA for the New Orleans Jazz
- Anicka Yi (born 1971), conceptual artist.
