= St. Raphael School =

Coordinates: 40.73966°N 73.92872°W

Saint Raphael School
- New York City (Queens, New York; United States

Information
- Type: Private school, Parochial School
- Motto: We bow before God
- Religious affiliation: Roman Catholic
- Patron saint: St. Raphael
- Established: 1956
- Closed: 2012
- School district: Roman Catholic Diocese of Brooklyn
- Principal: Mrs. Anne Maurer
- Faculty: 22
- Grades: Nursery-8
- Average class size: 15
- Student to teacher ratio: 5:1
- Campus type: Private
- Colors: Columbia Blue and Gold
- Accreditation: Middle States Association of Colleges and Schools
- Affiliation: Religious Sisters of Mercy

St. Raphael's School was a private, coeducational Catholic elementary school in Long Island City, Queens in New York City. St. Raphael's campus encompasses 8 separate buildings situated on private grounds.

Saint Raphael School was founded in 1956, by the Religious Sisters of Mercy upon the urging of Msgr. John McMurray, then pastor of the now defunct St. Raphael Parish. It closed in 2012 after falling enrollment made continued operation untenable.

== Academics ==
Prior to its closing, St. Raphael's boasted the following:

- Student : teacher ratio of 5:1
- An average class size of 15
- Every year 100% of St. Raphael's graduates go on to Catholic high schools
- State-of-the-art science laboratory
- "Smartboard" technology in every classroom.
- Over 100 brand new computers throughout the campus.

The school was Chartered by the State of New York and Accredited by the Middle States Association of Colleges and Schools.
