= Standard Motor Products =

US automotive aftermarket company

Standard Motor Products, Inc.
- Type: Public
- Traded as: NYSE: SMP; S&P 600 component
- Industry: Automobile
- Founded: 1919
- Founder: Elias Fife, Ralph Van Allen
- Headquarters: Long Island City, New York, U.S.
- Area served: Worldwide
- Key people: Eric P. Sills (Chairman, President & CEO); James J. Burke (Director & Chief Operating Officer); Nathan Iles (Chief Financial Officer)
- Revenue: ▲US$1.79 billion (2025)
- Net income: ▲US$41.3 million (2025)
- Number of employees: 6,100 (includes JVs)
- Website: smpcorp.com

Standard Motor Products, Inc. (NYSE: SMP) is a manufacturer and distributor of automotive parts. The company was founded in 1919 as a partnership by Elias Fife and Ralph Van Allen and incorporated by Fife in 1926. It is headquartered in Long Island City, New York, and trades on the New York Stock Exchange. SMP includes four operational segments: Vehicle Control, Temperature Control, Engineered Solutions and Nissens. SMP’s Vehicle Control and Temperature Control divisions supply automotive aftermarket components to retailers and distributors across North America. Engineered Solutions offers custom-designed products to vehicle and equipment manufacturers, including both on-highway and off-highway. Nissens is a European aftermarket supplier of air conditioning, engine cooling, and emission control components, serving on- and off-highway vehicles.

SMP is a supplier to NAPA, AutoZone, O’Reilly, Federated, and others, selling its products to warehouse distributors and auto parts retail chains under its own brand names such as Standard, Blue Streak, Echlin, BWD, and Four Seasons, as well as under private label brands for key customers.

SMP has 21 manufacturing facilities and 15 design and development centers. SMP also has distribution facilities with warehouses across North America and Europe.

== History ==
Standard Motor Products CEO Timeline

Standard Motor Products was founded in Manhattan in 1919 as a partnership between Elias Fife, a Jewish immigrant from Lithuania, and Ralph Van Allen to specialize in ignition and electrical parts. In 1920, Van Allen opened a Standard Motor Products branch in Seattle, and the following year, the company moved to the Long Island City section of Queens. After the partnership dissolved in 1925, the company was incorporated with Fife as the sole proprietor in 1926. Van Allen operated a separate company in Los Angeles under the same name and logo until selling it to Fife in 1936, the same year SMP moved into the Art Deco building where it remains headquartered today.

== Nissens acquisition ==
In November 2024, SMP acquired Nissens Automotive. Nissens was founded in 1921 in Denmark as a workshop that offered radiator repair services to local garages. Over time, Nissens grew to manufacture its own radiators and expanded its product portfolio to include multiple climate control, engine cooling and engine efficiency components.

Nissens operates facilities across Europe, Canada, the United States of America, Mexico and China.

== Manufacturing and distribution ==
SMP has 21 manufacturing facilities and 15 design and development centers. Nearly 70% of SMP’s manufacturing takes place in its North American facilities, including Greenville, South Carolina, Independence, Kansas; Milwaukee, Wisconsin; Mishawaka, Indiana; Reynosa, Mexico; St. Thomas, Ontario and other locations.

SMP has distribution facilities with warehouses in North America and Europe. North American customers are supplied by distribution facilities in Lewisville, Texas, Fort Lauderdale, Florida, Disputanta, Virginia, Mississauga, Ontario; and Shawnee, Kansas. SMP also operates multiple distribution facilities in Europe.

== Operations and products ==
SMP has four operational segments. Vehicle Control brands include Standard, Blue Streak, Echlin, BWD, GP Sorenson, Belden, OEM, and Pollak.

SMP’s Temperature Control Segment manufactures air-conditioning, heating, engine cooling system, windshield washer parts, air-conditioning compressors, and power window accessories. Temperature Control brands include Four Seasons, Hayden Automotive and Everco HD.

SMP’s Engineered Solutions segment provides customized solutions to vehicle manufacturers This product portfolio includes fuel injectors, ignition coils, electronic controls, and AC components such as electrical compressors, multiple sensors, switches and clamps. Engineered Solutions’ customer base includes manufacturers of powersport vehicles, construction and agricultural equipment, and both light and heavy-duty vehicles.

SMP’s fourth and newest operational segment is Nissens Automotive, which offers engineered products for light and heavy-duty vehicle[AS1] s within engine cooling, air conditioning, engine efficiency and emissions. Nissens’ product offering includes AC condensers, compressors, evaporators, radiators, water pumps, EGR coolers, electronic throttle bodies and more. Nissens markets and distributes products under the Nissens, Highway and AVA brands.

== Customer awards ==
SMP received multiple customer awards in 2022, including the Spirit of NAPA Award, O’Reilly Auto Parts Supplier of the Year and Technical Training Awards, AutoZone Extra Miler, Aftermarket Auto Parts Alliance Outstanding Customer Service and People’s Choice Awards, Automotive Parts Services Group Outstanding Vendor of the Year Award and Service Level Excellence Award, Waytek New Product of the Year Award, Parts Authority Operational Performance Award, and NAPA Canada Supplier of the Year Award. Also for 2022, SMP de Mexico’s Reynosa Wire and Cable Manufacturing facility received a Supplier Quality Excellence Award from General Motors.

In 2023, SMP received the Outstanding Shipping Performance, Outstanding Training, and Channel Partner of The Year awards from the Aftermarket Auto Parts Alliance, Inc. SMP also earned the Automotive Parts Services Group (The Group) Vendor of the Year Award, as well as AutoZone’s “What It Takes to Do the Job Right” Award. SMP also earned XL Parts/The Parts House’s Vendor of the Year Award and Parts Warehouse Inc.’s Supplier of the Year – Gold Category award for 2023. Additionally, SMP’s Reynosa, Mexico facility earned General Motors’ Supplier Quality Excellence Award for the fifth consecutive year.

In 2024, SMP received awards from several suppliers. They included NAPA Canada Supplier of the Year Award, AutoZone Mexico Extra Miler, O’Reilly Training and Technical Support Award, The Alliance Technology and Marketing Content Award and Outstanding Shipping Award, Parts Authority Supply Chain Award, APH Outstanding Training Support Award, AutoWares Data and Technology Supplier of Year, NPW Customer Service Vendor of the Year, and 2024 National Automotive Quality Award Mexico.

The Automotive Parts Associates presented SMP with its 2025 Cornerstone Award in March 2025. In April, two SMP locations were granted General Motors’ Customer Care and Aftersales Awards – McAllen, Texas facility received a Gold status award, and the Independence, Kansas facility achieved Platinum status in recognition of outstanding 2024 on-time shipping performance. Also in April, SMP earned Fisher Auto Parts’ Standout Star Award for 2025.

== Awards ==
In 2023, during the AAPEX Show in Las Vegas, SMP was the recipient of the 2023 Company Ally of the Year Award from Women in Auto Care.

== Sales ==
Consolidated net sales for the twelve months ended December 31, 2024, were $1.46 billion, compared to consolidated net sales of $1.36 billion during the comparable period in 2023.
