= United States Post Office (Long Island City, Queens) =

Historic post office in Queens, New York

- US Post Office-Long Island City
- U.S. National Register of Historic Places
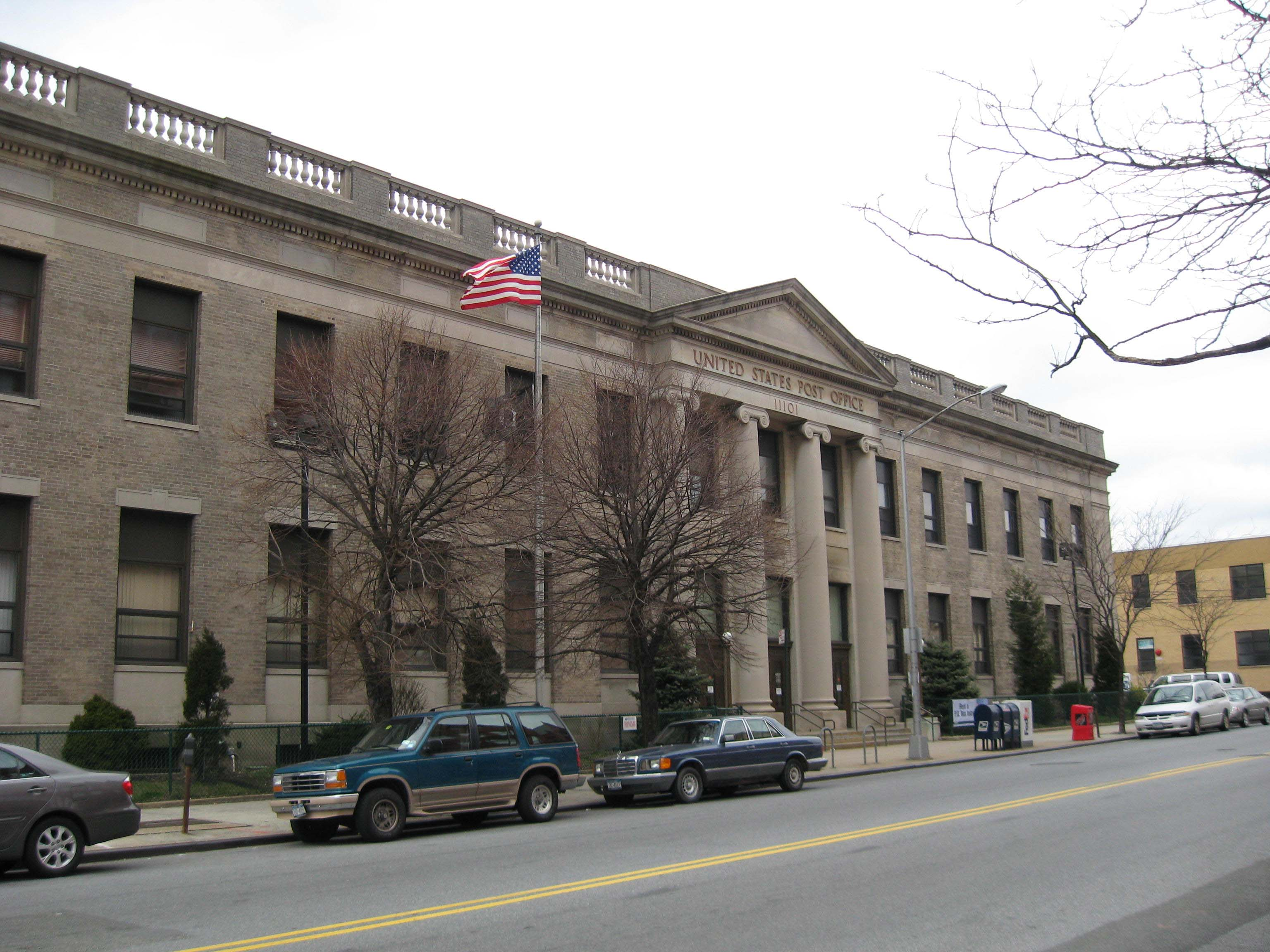
- U.S. Post Office, Long Island City, April 2008

- Location within New York City Location within New York Location within the United States
- Location: 4602 21st St., Long Island City, Queens
- Coordinates: 40°44′44″N 73°56′55″W
- Area: less than one acre
- Built: 1928
- Architect: James A. Wetmore, US Treasury Department
- Architectural style: Colonial Revival
- MPS: US Post Offices in New York State, 1858-1943, TR
- NRHP reference No.: 88002348
- Added to NRHP: May 11, 1989

The Long Island City Post Office is a historic post office building located at Long Island City in Queens County, New York, United States. It was built in 1928, and is one of a number of post offices in New York designed by the Office of the Supervising Architect under director James A. Wetmore. The building is a two-story, symmetrically massed brick building with limestone trim in the Colonial Revival style. It features a frontispiece with four semi-engaged limestone Ionic order columns that support a pedimented entablature.

It was listed on the National Register of Historic Places in 1989.
