= Firehouse, Engine Company 261 and Ladder Company 116 =

Firehouse in Queens, New York

Firehouse, Engine Company 261, Hook & Ladder Company 116
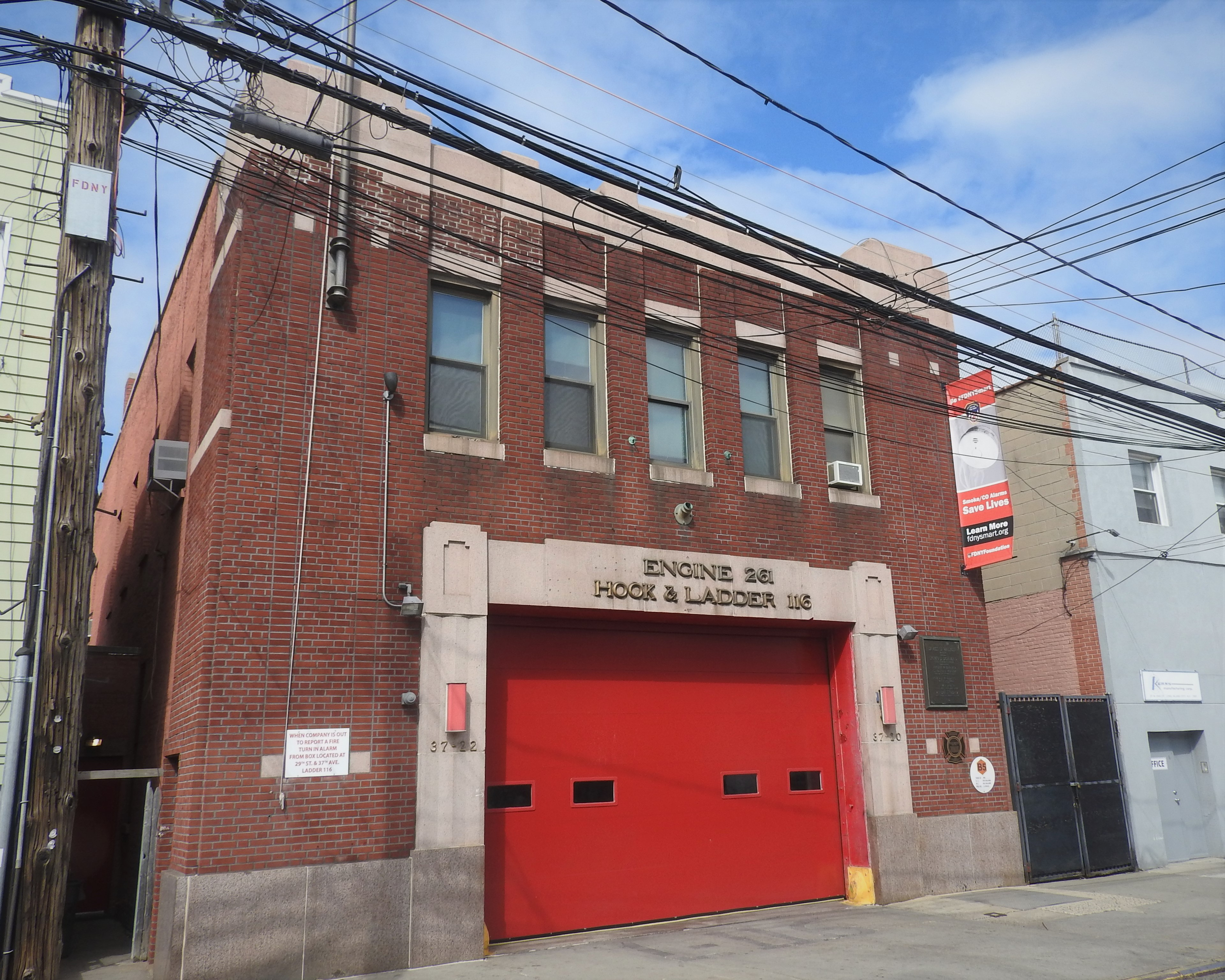
- The firehouse in September 2019

- Location within New York City Location within New York Location within the United States

General information
- Location: 37-20 29th Street, Queens, New York City, New York, United States
- Coordinates: 40°45′19″N 73°56′00″W
- Inaugurated: 1894 (Engine Co. 261)
- Relocated: 1932

Firehouse, Engine Company 261 and Ladder Company 116 is a New York City Fire Department firehouse at 37-20 29th Street in Long Island City, Queens, New York City. The firehouse was purpose-built in 1932 for both firefighter companies.

Engine Company 261 was established in 1894 as Long Island City Fire Department's Engine Company 3, and was renumbered in 1913. Engine Company 261 served both Long Island City and the nearby community of Roosevelt Island until 2003, until it was closed as a cost-saving measure, while Ladder Company 116 still operates out of the firehouse. Fire officials, local residents, and business owners have argued that the engine company should be re-opened.

== Building ==
Construction of the present firehouse at 29th Street started in the 1930s. After the foundation was completed, work was halted by early 1932 because the New York City Comptroller, Charles W. Berry, had failed to allocate funds for construction. Berry approved construction contracts for the firehouse in late March 1932. The building opened in November 1932 and was the first firehouse in Queens with its own water tower. Upon the opening of the 29th Street firehouse, Engine Co. 261 and Ladder Co. 116 vacated their former headquarters at 38-08 28th Street, one block away.

== Engine Company 261 ==
Engine Company 261 was established as Long Island City Fire Department's Engine Company 3 in 1894. It was renumbered after Long Island City was annexed by New York City in 1913.

In 2003, Engine Company 261 was closed as a cost-saving measure. The closure was one of six announced by Michael Bloomberg, on May 26, 2003. At the time of its closure it had served both Long Island City and nearby Roosevelt Island. The New York Times noted how residents who lived near the closed stations expressed various degrees of distress, with some other closures triggering greater distress. There was controversy over the firehouse's closure, as Community Board 8 had not been sufficiently notified in advance. A New York Supreme Court judge subsequently ruled that the closure was illegal.

In June 2017, New York City Council member Jimmy Van Bramer and local residents started to advocate for Engine Company 261's reopening, citing large population growth in Long Island City. Representatives of the Fire Fighter's Association said that the population of the station's service area had grown from 60,000 when it was closed to 200,000 in 2015. Efforts to reopen the engine company increased in late 2018 and early 2019, after Amazon had announced that it had chosen a site near the station to house their massive new headquarters, Amazon HQ2. Assemblywoman Catherine Nolan pointed out that when mayor Bill de Blasio was a city councilman, he had also argued for reopening the station. Other advocates of Engine Company 261's reinstatement included U.S. representative Carolyn Maloney, whose 12th congressional district included Roosevelt Island and Long Island City. However, plans for reopening the engine company were postponed in mid-2019 after the cancellation of the New York City campus of Amazon HQ2.

== Ladder Company 116 ==
Ladder Company 116 still operates within the firehouse. The difference between the two companies is that ladder companies focus on rescuing occupants of buildings on fire and ventilating heat, smoke and gases and do not carry pumps, hose, or water, while engine companies focus on actually extinguishing fire.
