= Anable Basin =

Inlet in Queens, New York

- Eleventh Street Basin
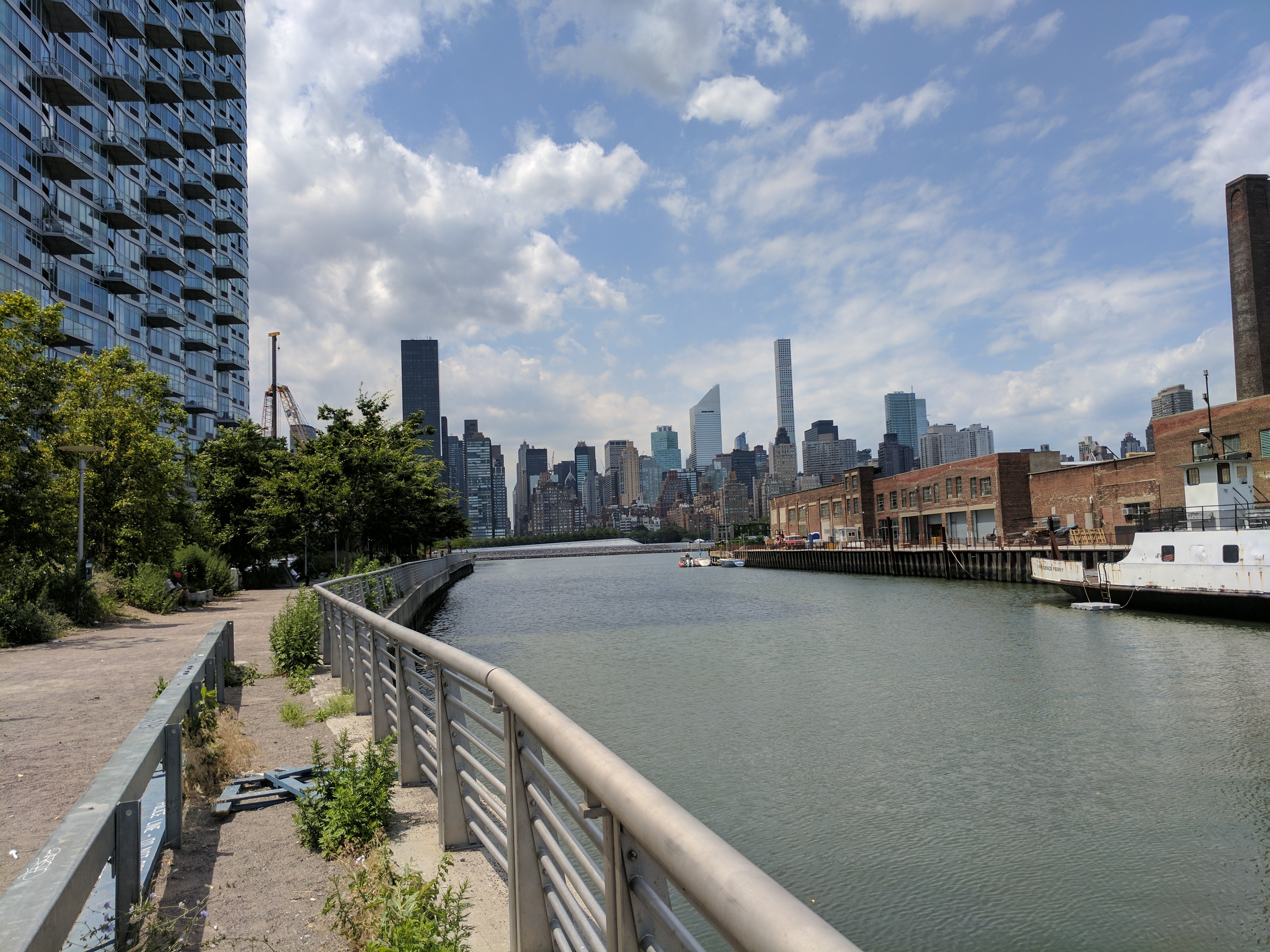
- A view of Manhattan from Anable Basin

- Location within New York City
- Coordinates: 40.74880°N 73.95622°W
- Type: Artificial inlet
- Part of: East River
- Built: 1868
- Max. length: 500 feet (150 m)

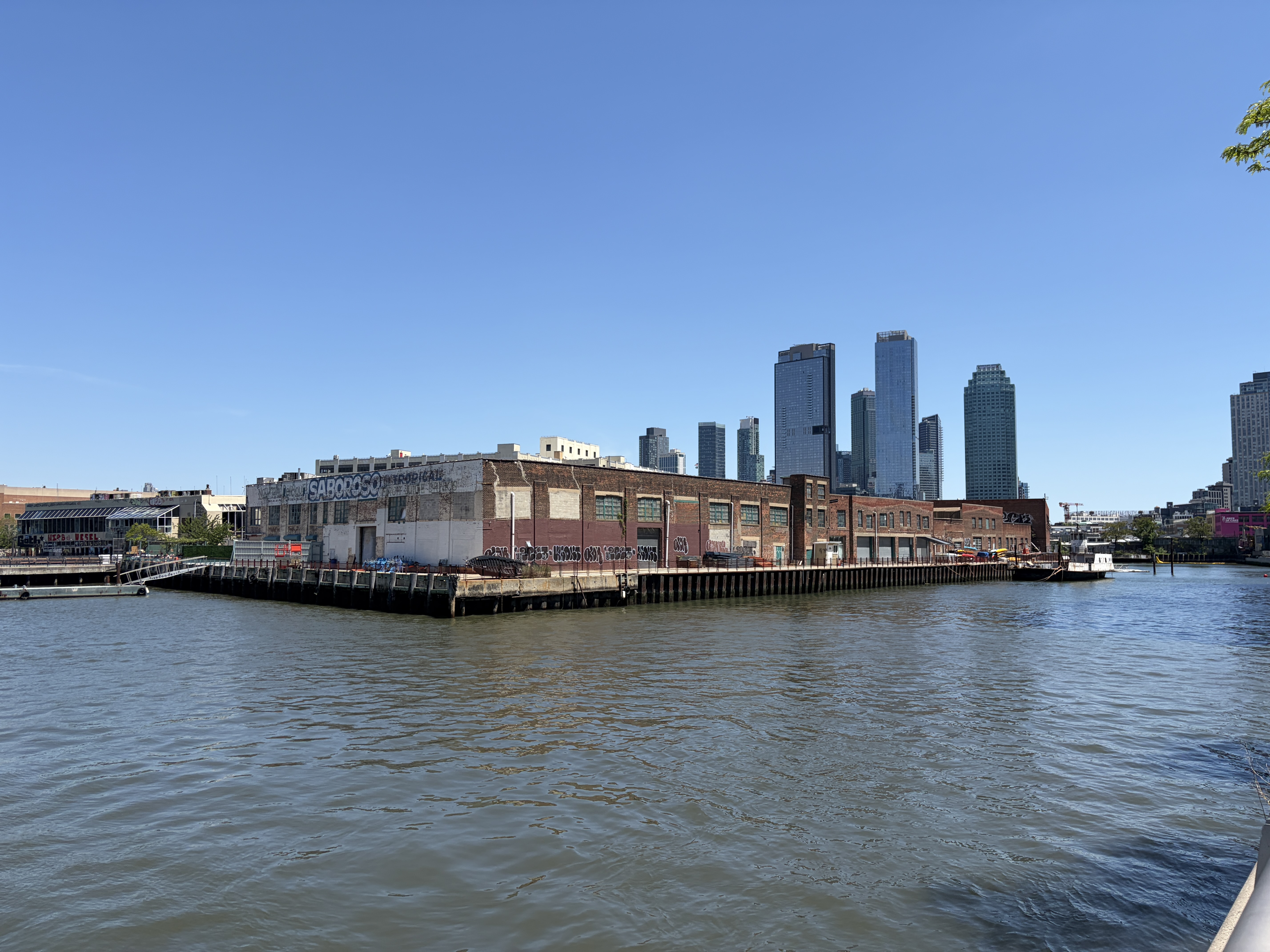
The Anable Basin, 2026

Anable Basin (also known as Eleventh Street Basin) is a 500-foot-long (150 m) artificial inlet of the East River located in the Long Island City neighborhood of Queens, New York City. It was carved in 1868 to serve the large concentrations of industrial firms in the neighborhood.

A public walkway along the southwest side of the basin was constructed as part of the Queens West development in 2012. The basin contains several private vessels, the former Water's Edge restaurant, a former Prudence Island ferry boat, and a floating dock owned by Long Island City Community Boathouse, used for its kayaking programs. In November 2018 it was announced that Amazon would be building its large Amazon HQ2 campus on the land surrounding the basin. However, these plans have since been canceled.

== Etymology ==
The basin's namesake is Henry Sheldon Anable, who was also the basin's financier. Anable was a prominent figure in local business and politics in 1860s, the time of the basin's creation. He was the nephew-in-law of then-president of Union College, Eliphalet Nott, who owned much of the land around Hunter's Point.

Anable's ancestors were among the early Puritan settlers of Massachusetts, arriving in 1623. He is a descendant of Anthony Annable who was a passenger of the Anne, the third ship to arrive in the Plymouth Colony.

== History ==
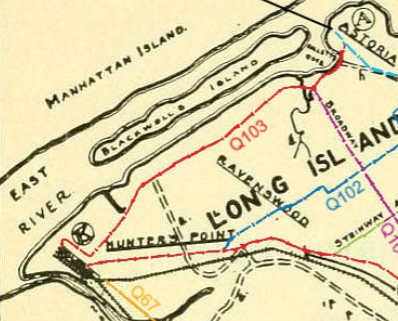
The short channel just south of Roosevelt Island (then Blackwell Island), is the Anable Basin. The larger channel in the corner of this 1912 map is Newtown Creek.

The inlet was carved in 1868 at a time when Long Island City was home to numerous oil refineries and factories. At the time of the canal's creation, a mastodon bone was found on the site of the basin.

For much of the 20th century, the major industrial property on the basin was Pepsi-Cola, which had its bottling plant at the point where Anable Basin meets the East River. In 1937 the prolific advertising firm Artkraft-Strauss Sign Corporation installed the cursive ruby-colored neon-on-metal Pepsi-Cola sign atop the bottling plant and it became an instant point of reference for Manhattan residents and passing ships. When the bottling plant was demolished in 1999, the iconic 120-foot-long sign was dismantled and reassembled at a nearby site by Rockrose Development Corporation. The sign is an official city landmark and part of Gantry Plaza State Park, which lines the shore of East River between Anable Basin and Hunters Point.

In 1980, Water's Edge, a waterfront restaurant specializing in wedding venue, opened on the north side of the basin. It operated for over 30 years, until the then-owner was indicted for bribery and fraud charges. A new eatery, Anable Basin Sailing Bar & Grill, has since opened across the street. The eatery offers mooring for vessels, picnic tables by the waterfront and a mixture of American and ethnic dishes including ćevapi, a Bosnian sausage.

=== Redevelopment ===
In 2017, local real estate firms TF Cornerstone and Plaxall separately submitted proposals to the city to rezone the area around Anable Basin for development. TF Cornerstone's plan for 1,000 apartments and a light manufacturing complex was submitted in July, while Plaxall submitted its plan for a 700-foot (210 m) tower in December. The following year, the northern end of the Basin became part of the planned Amazon HQ2 Long Island City campus. Due to community opposition, Amazon withdrew its plans to build the Amazon HQ2 campus in February 2019.

According to The City, following Amazon's decision to not try to build a second headquarters near Anable Basin, the New York City Council invited three property developers to prepare plans for future development of the neighborhood. The three developers were TF Cornerstone, Simon Baron Development, and L&L Mag. A spokesman for city council explained “One of the main problems we had with Amazon’s proposal was the lack of community engagement. We’re happy that these stakeholders are being proactive, we look forward to being active participants in the process.” The Justice For All Coalition has called for any future development to be solely not-for-profit enterprises, and to restrict future commercial development.

The group Your LIC, which was composed of TF Cornerstone, Plaxall, Simon Baron Development, and L&L Mag, announced in May 2020 that they wanted to develop up to 1,200,000 square feet (110,000 m^{2}) of space on a 28-acre (11 ha) area composed of their individual holdings around Anable Basin. The plan would include up to 15 towers of between 400 and 700 feet (120 and 210 m), as well as 7 acres (2.8 ha) of open space, three schools, and 500,000 square feet (46,000 m^{2}) of arts and culture space; half of the total new development space would be commercially zoned. The plan would require that the property be rezoned, and environmental scoping and land-use review would have to be conducted over the next year.

== Art and culture ==
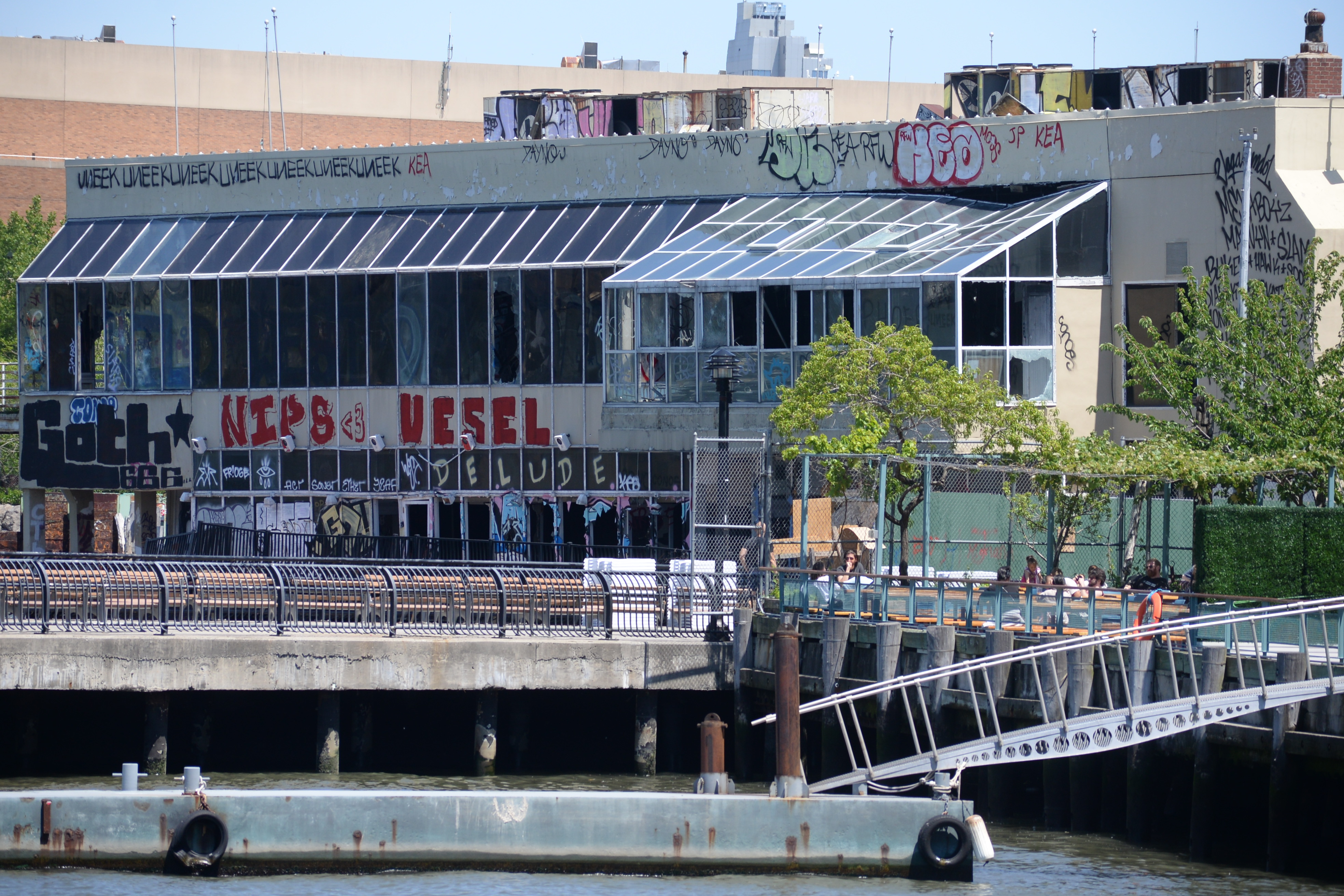
Graffiti and docks near the Anable Basin

In October 2007, artist Chico MacMurtrie introduced the sculpture A Tree for Anable Basin in the basin. The 24-foot-high aluminum tree was set atop a floating island planted with native grass species. MacMurtrie is the founder of the Brooklyn-based workshop Amorphic Robot Works.

In August 2012, to showcase sustainable agriculture, Cooper Union architecture student Karim Ahmed designed a hydroponic garden atop a 20-foot raft that was launched in the Anable Basin. Waterpod, as the project was called, grew sunflowers, kale, corn, and a baby nectarine tree. The project was inspired by the chinampa floating farms used in Aztec society. Ahmed's raft was moored at the northwest corner of the basin where Anable Basin Sailing Bar & Grill is located.

In October 2016, The Plaxall Gallery was opened by LIC Artists Inc., a 12,000-square-foot converted waterfront warehouse donated by Plaxall Inc. and is home to three art galleries, a 90-seat theatre, outdoor event space and is located on the Anable Basin in Long Island City and over the years has become an important institution for the surrounding artistic community. In April 2020 the space was taken over by Culture Lab LIC, a new nonprofit arts and community organization.

In June 2017, local art curator Brandon Stosuy in collaboration with Matthew Barney and a group of other artists installed a Trump countdown clock at the entrance of Anable Basin, visible from Manhattan. The art piece counted down the days and hours remaining in U.S. president Donald Trump's first presidency.

== See also ==
- Queens West
