= Water's Edge (restaurant) =

Restaurant in Queens, New York, 1983–2015

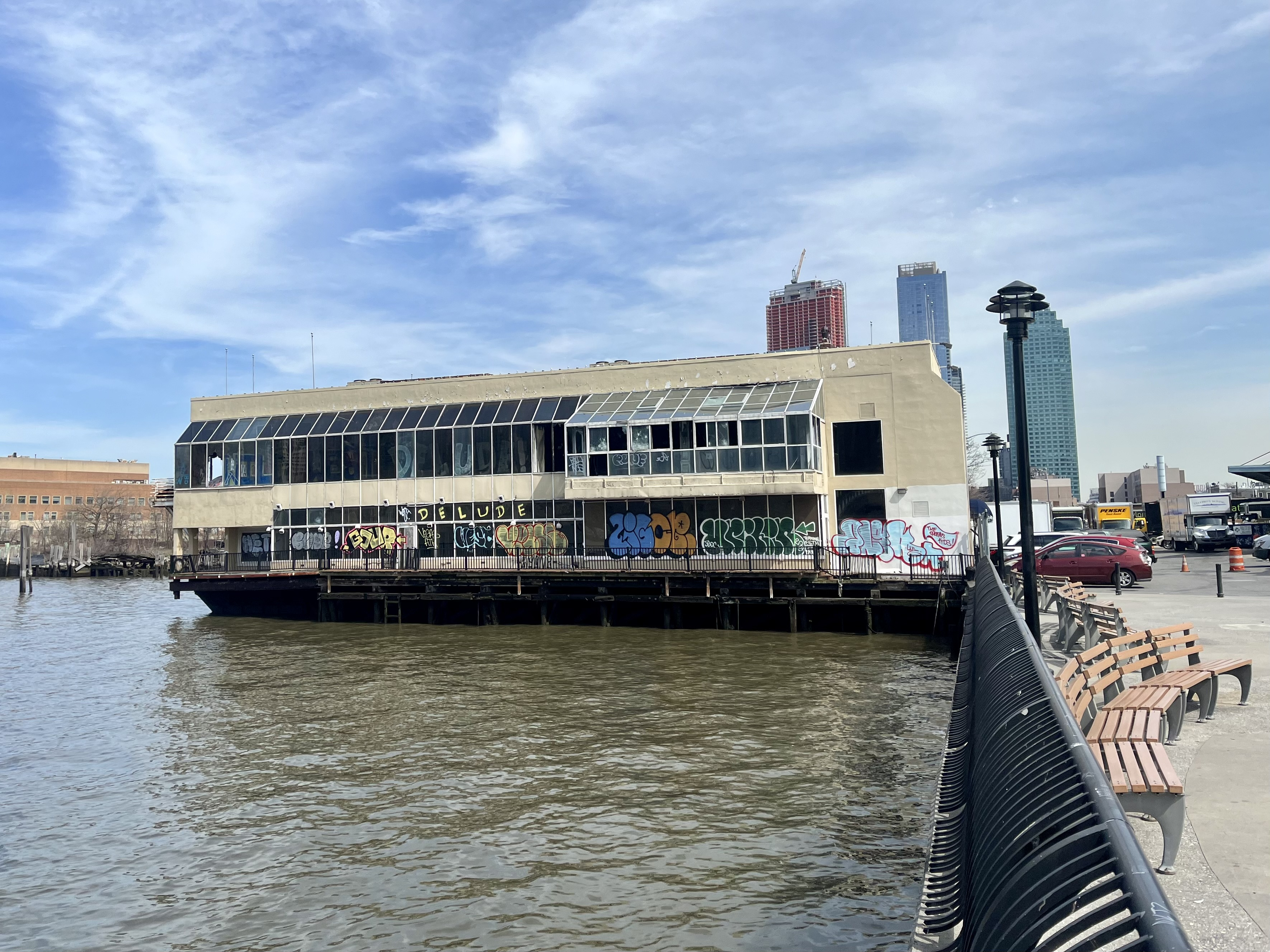
- Former location of the restaurant in 2024
- Interactive map of Water's Edge

Restaurant information
- Established: 1983
- Closed: 2015
- Location: 4-01 44th Drive, Long Island City, New York, 11101, United States
- Coordinates: 40°44′59″N 73°57′19″W

Water's Edge was a restaurant on barges moored in the East River on the Long Island City waterfront in Queens, New York that operated from 1983 to 2015. Located at the foot of 44th Drive between Anable Basin and the Queensboro Bridge, the restaurant had a panoramic view of the Midtown Manhattan skyline and was a popular wedding venue.

== History ==
Water's Edge was the third waterfront restaurant to be built on vacant land under New York City's waterfront development program, following The River Café in Brooklyn and The Water Club in Manhattan. It took three years of planning and negotiations to develop the restaurant, which cost $3 million to build and opened in 1983. Located on the Long Island City waterfront in Queens, the two-level restaurant was constructed on two barges moored to the Nott Avenue Pier at the foot of 44th Drive. The floating venue consisted of a 200-seat dining room on the lower level and a smaller dining room on the upper level for private parties. Water's Edge had an outdoor deck facing the river and included dock space for guests arriving by private yachts.

In conjunction with the development of the restaurant, the adjacent Nott Avenue Pier was refurbished and opened to the public. The restaurant was required to maintain the pier as a public access area as part of its lease agreement with the city. In 1979, the city had previously announced plans to refurbish the Nott Avenue Pier with benches and trees and open up the dock to the public. The pier's name reflected the former name of the street—44th Drive had been previously called Nott Avenue before the Queens Topographical Bureau renamed the borough's streets according to a grid plan in the early part of the twentieth century.

With its waterfront setting and panoramic view of the Midtown Manhattan skyline, Water's Edge was a popular location for weddings. It was the site of the wedding reception for Billy Joel and Christie Brinkley, who were married there in 1985. Although the Nott Avenue Pier was supposed to be accessible to the public from sunrise to sunset, local residents complained that they were being kept off the 40-foot-wide (12 m) by 147-foot-long (45 m) city-owned pier during weddings held at the Water's Edge, particularly during summer weekends. In response, the city installed prohibition signs depicting a bride and groom on the pier in 1990. The signs did not technically ban weddings, but were intended to stop private ceremonies that blocked public access to the pier, which was illegal and subject to a fine of up to $5,000. The signs disappeared by 1993, but the city did not plan to replace them because there had been no weddings or complaints from neighbors.

The restaurant was originally run by the Quinn Restaurant Corporation, headed by Thomas J. Quinn, which entered into a 25-year lease agreement with the city in 1981 to construct, operate and maintain the restaurant, with an option to renew for 10 years. The long-term lease agreement was taken over by Mark Fleischman in 1985 after he sold his interest in Studio 54. During this time, the city threatened to take legal action against the restaurant due to the prior owner's failure to pay back rent and make obligated improvements to the Nott Avenue Pier.

Fleischman only operated the restaurant for an eight-month period, after which it was taken over in September 1985 by Stuart and Marika Somerstein, who also owned a catering firm on Long Island. The couple spent $4 million renovating Water's Edge, which included the addition of a 350-seat ballroom on the second floor for catered events. The new owners also implemented a complimentary water taxi service that provided service to Water's Edge from the Skyport Marina at the foot of East 23rd Street in Manhattan. In subsequent years, the water taxi service operated from the East 34th Street Ferry Landing in Manhattan using a paddle wheel boat. In 1988, the restaurant proposed building a 15-slip marina to attract additional diners that could travel from Connecticut, Long Island, and Westchester to the restaurant in their private boats.

=== Closure and demolition ===
Water's Edge was acquired by Harendra Singh in 2008. The restaurant closed in 2015 after its owner was indicted for bribery and fraud charges. Singh was charged with bribing a Town of Oyster Bay official and filing fraudulent receipts from vendors to inflate the value of Water's Edge to obtain $900,000 in disaster relief funds from the Federal Emergency Management Agency after Hurricane Sandy. During this time, the federal government launched a separate investigation into whether the administration of New York City mayor Bill de Blasio provided favorable treatment to Singh in a lease dispute between the restaurant and the city. Singh had made campaign donations to de Blasio and also hosted fundraisers at the Water's Edge for de Blasio for free in 2011 and 2013, only subsequently generating bills for the events in 2015 following audits made by the city's Campaign Finance Board.

The shuttered restaurant was located on the footprint of the proposed Amazon HQ2 in Long Island City, which was announced in 2018 and then subsequently canceled the following year due to opposition. Before that, in 2017 the New York City Economic Development Corporation had selected a team led by TF Cornerstone to redevelop the site into a 1.5-million-square-foot (140,000 m^{2}) mixed-use development.

The city evicted the restaurant from the site in 2020. It initially put up the barges for auction in 2022, but pulled the listing after determining that they could not be safely moved given their condition. The city instead announced plans to demolish the barges. A fire broke out at the abandoned restaurant in October 2023.
