= Gantry Plaza State Park =

Public park in Queens, New York

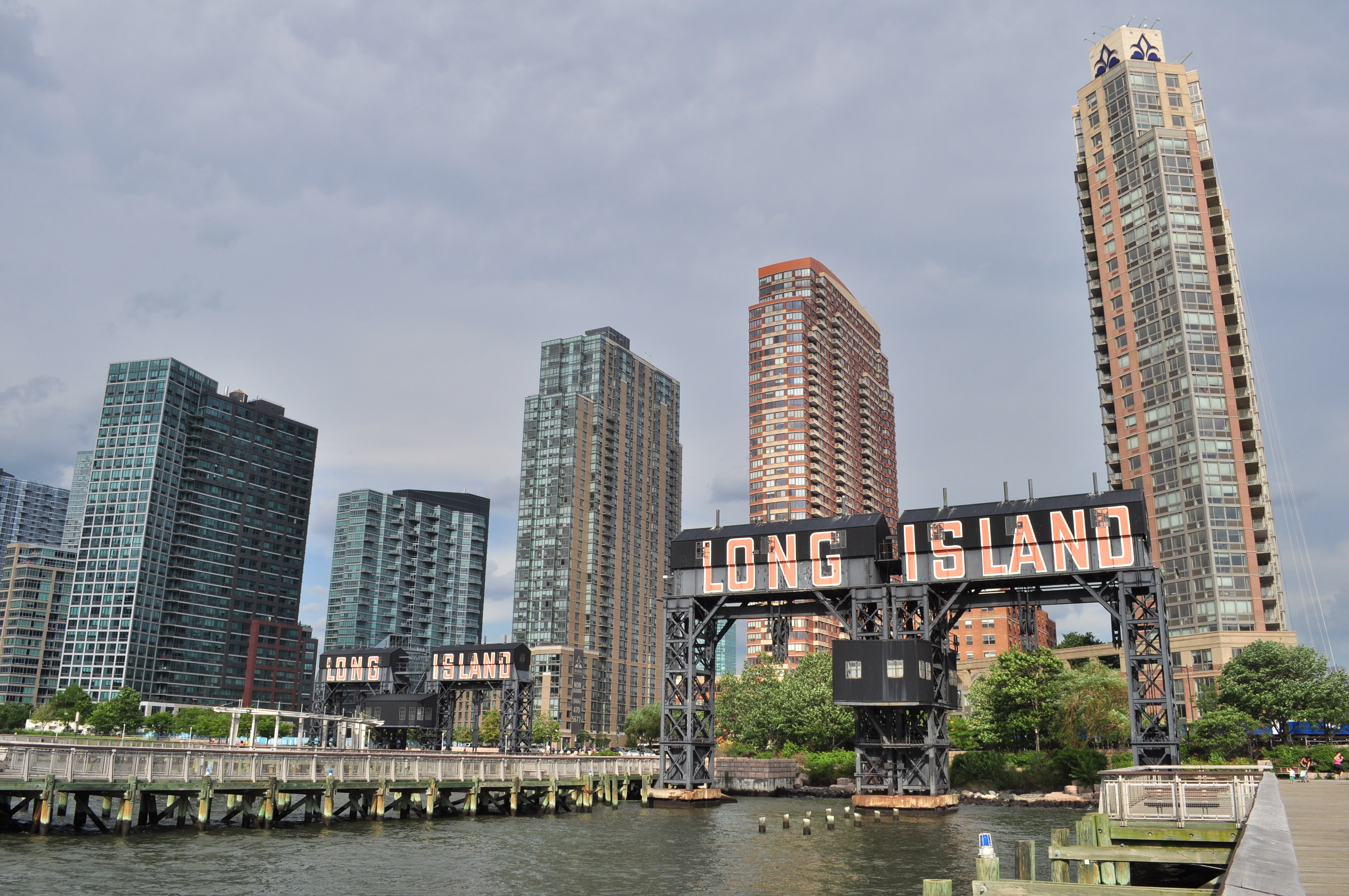

- Location within New York City
- Type: State park
- Location: Hunters Point, Queens, New York City, United States
- Coordinates: 40°44′43″N 73°57′32″W
- Area: 12 acres (4.9 ha)
- Created: May 1998
- Operator: New York State Office of Parks, Recreation and Historic Preservation
- Visitors: 905,450 (in 2014)

Gantry Plaza State Park is a 12-acre (4.9 ha) state park on the East River in the Hunters Point section of Long Island City, in the New York City borough of Queens. The park is located in a former dockyard and manufacturing district, and includes remnants of facilities from the area's past. The most prominent feature of the park is a collection of gantries with car float transfer bridges, which in turn were served by barges that carried freight railcars between Queens and Manhattan.

== History ==
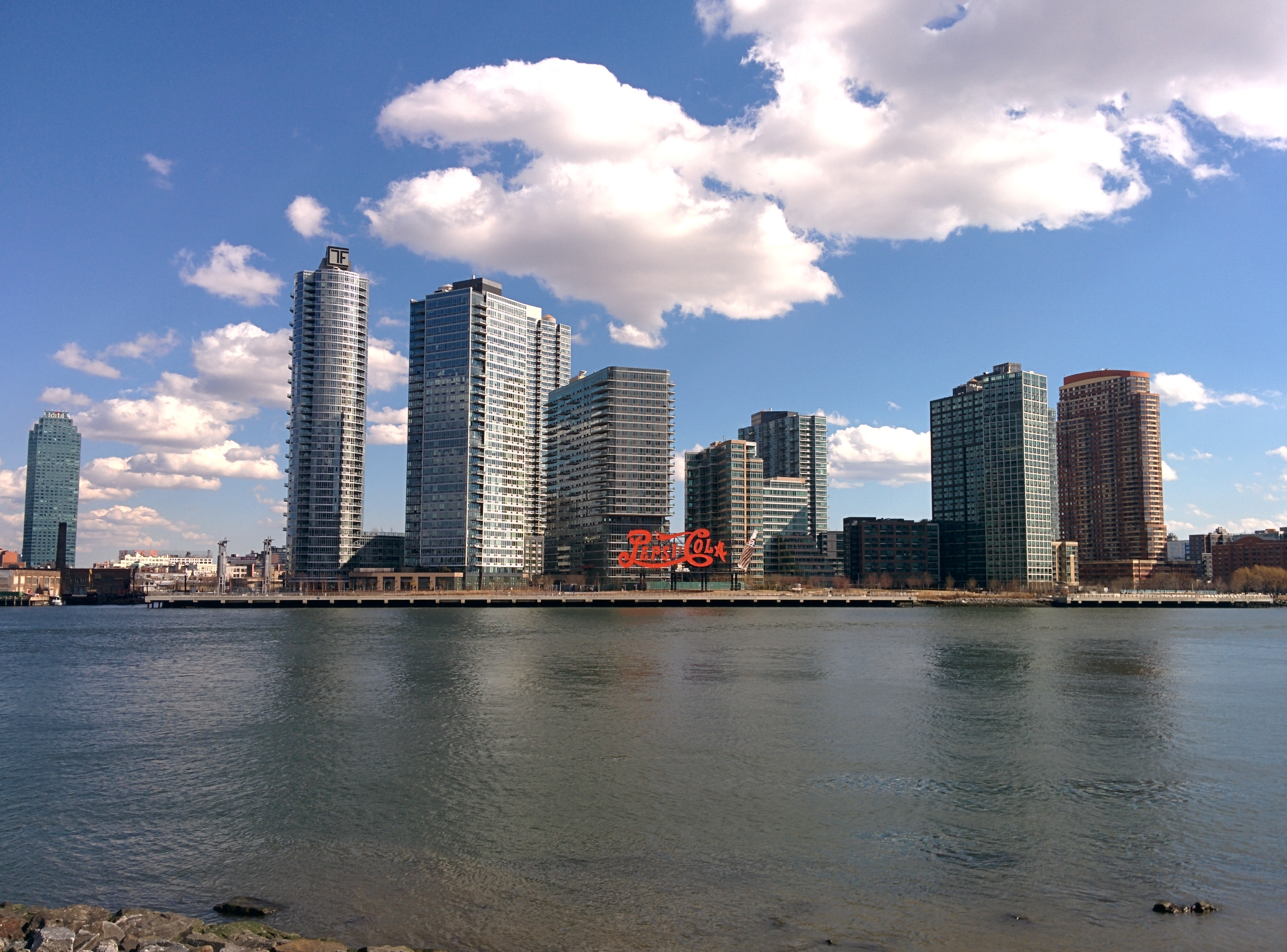
The park as seen from Roosevelt Island

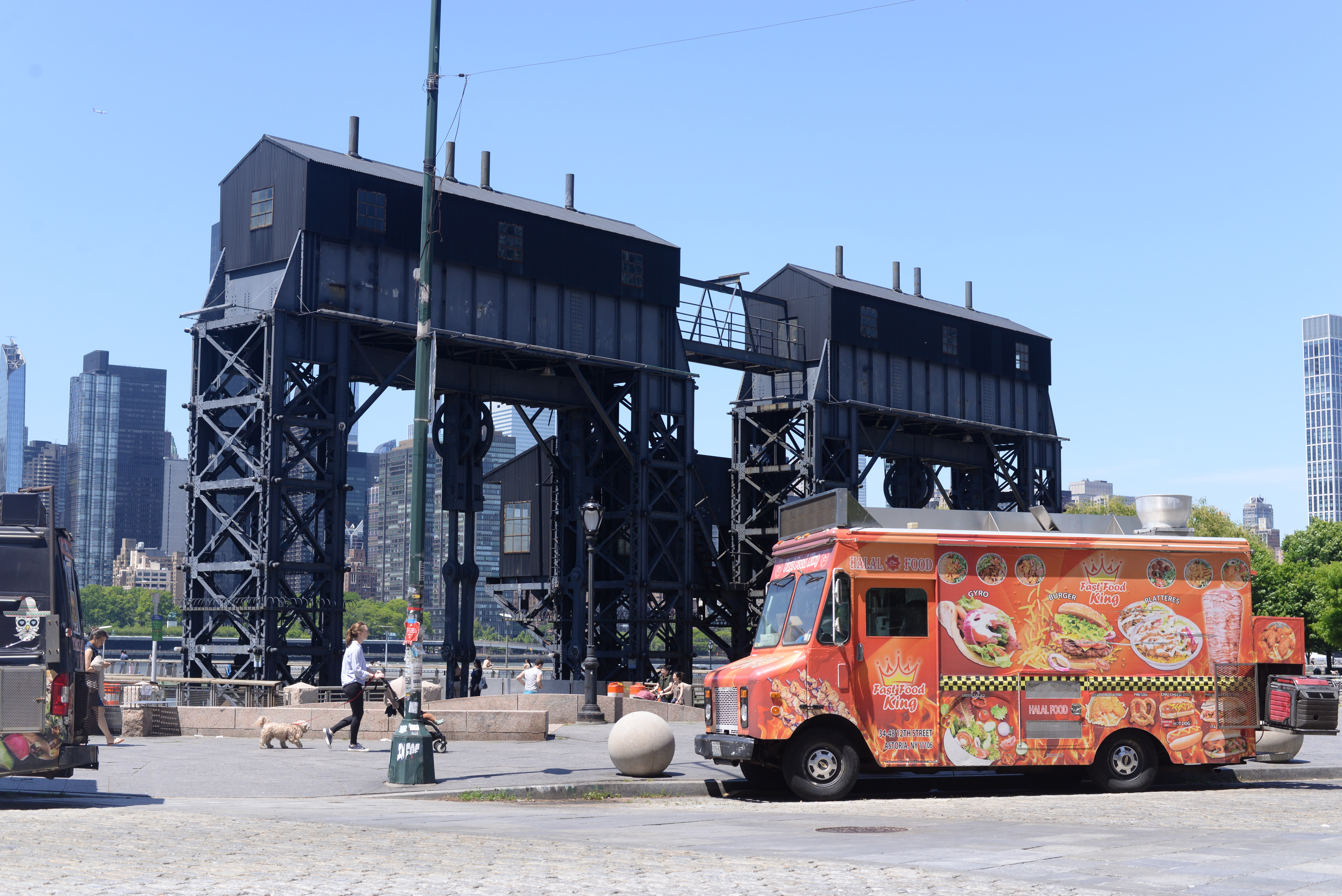
Food trucks, transfer bridges, and support gantries in the park

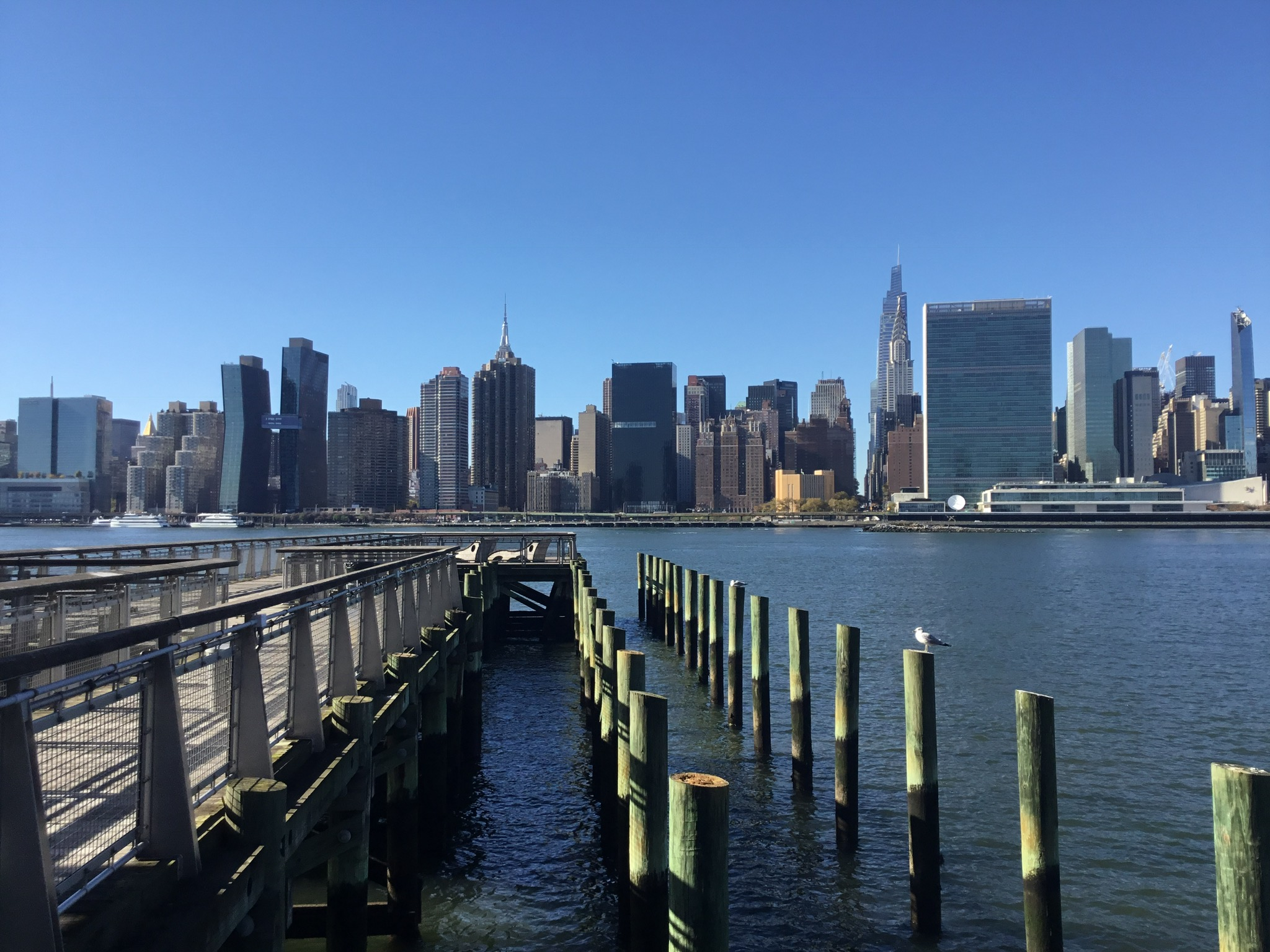
View from Gantry Plaza State Park toward Midtown Manhattan

The southern portion of the park is a former dock facility and includes restored "contained apron" transfer bridges of the James B. French patent. These were built in 1925 to load and unload rail car floats that served industries on Long Island via the Long Island Rail Road's North Shore Freight Branch, which used to run on the south side of 48th Avenue (now part of Hunter's Point Park). The northern portion of Gantry Plaza State Park was part of a former PepsiCo bottling plant that closed in 1999. The freight branch was located below street level, and it was infilled in the early 2000s.

The park contains a 120-foot-long (37 m), 60-foot-high (18 m) cursive, ruby-colored, neon-on-metal Pepsi-Cola sign, manufactured by the General Outdoor Advertising Company in 1939 and rebuilt by Artkraft Strauss in 1993. It was located on top of the bottling plant before it was dismantled and reassembled into a permanent location within the park in 2009. The Pepsi-Cola sign was designated a New York City landmark on April 12, 2016.

The park first opened in May 1998 and was expanded in July 2009. The park was developed in stages by the Queens West Development Corporation. The original section of Gantry Plaza State Park was designed by Thomas Balsley with Lee Weintraub, both New York City landscape architects, and Richard Sullivan, an architect. Stage 2, the new six-acre (2.4 ha) section of the park, was designed by New York City landscape architecture firm Abel Bainnson Butz and the first phase of Stage 2, Hunter's Point South Waterfront Park, opened to the public in 2009. The second phase of Hunter's Point South Waterfront Park, opened in June 2018.

== Facilities ==
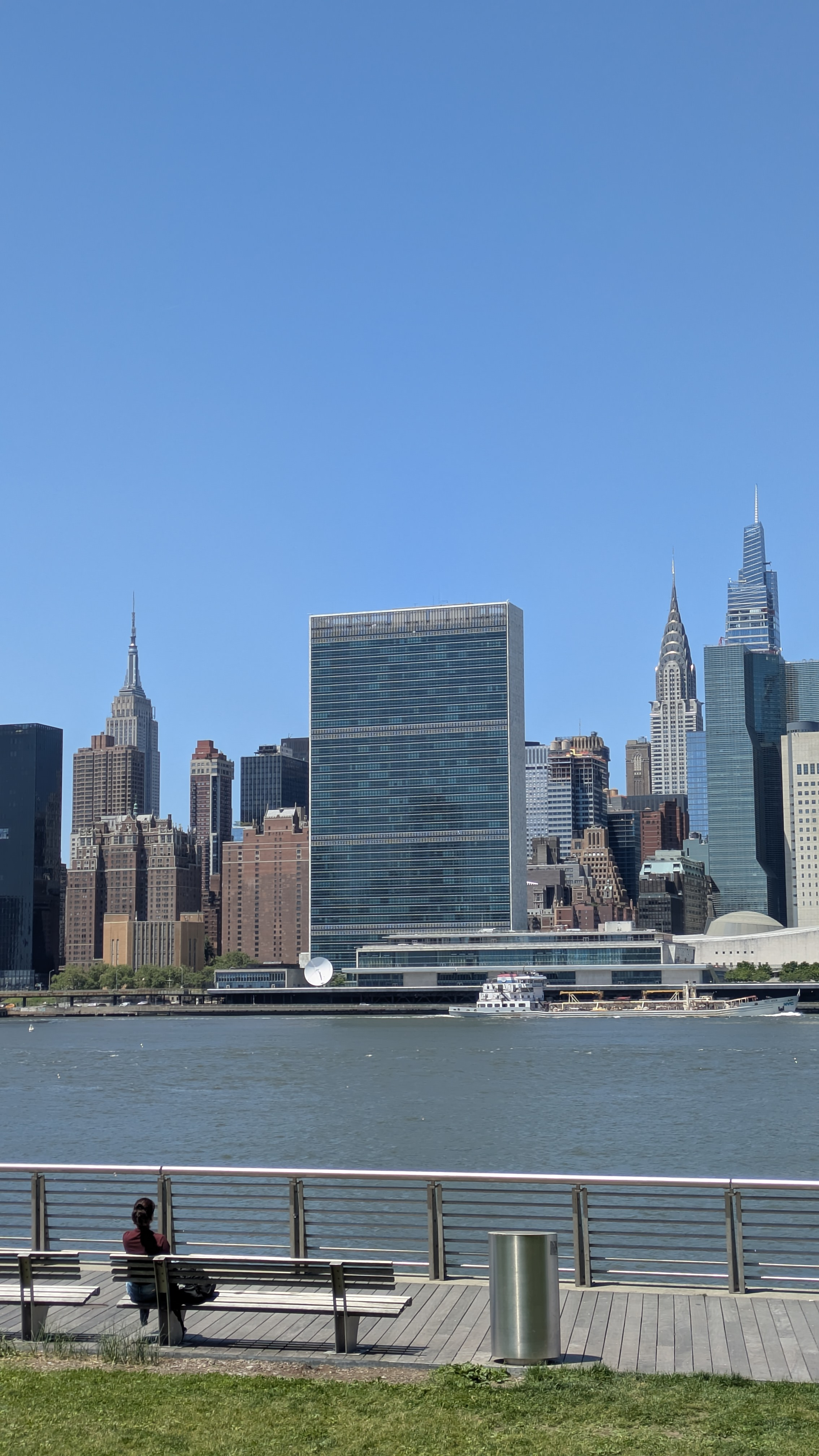
The view of UN headquarters from the park

The park offers picnic tables, a playground, playing fields, and a waterfront promenade facing the headquarters of the United Nations and the Midtown Manhattan skyline. Fishing and crabbing is permitted at pier #4, subject to New York State Department of Environmental Conservation regulations.

The park is served by the "Long Island City" stop on the Astoria Ferry and Rockaway Rocket routes of the NYC Ferry.

== In popular culture ==
- A view of Gantry Plaza State Park is seen one hour and nine seconds into the 1969 Olsen-banden film The Olsen Gang in a Fix.
- The film Munich took advantage of the park in its final scene, shot in 2005. The pier and the Pepsi-Cola sign to its north are visible in this scene.
- The same location was used in The Interpreter, in the final scene where Nicole Kidman's character says goodbye to Sean Penn's character, who is sitting on a fence by Gantry Park. The Pepsi-Cola sign at the former bottling plant is visible in the scene as well.

== See also ==
- James Slip Ferry
- List of New York state parks
