= Henry Sheldon Anable =

American land speculator

- Born: c. 1815
- Died: 1887 (aged 71–72)
- Occupation: land speculator
- Known for: Anable basin, the site of an once-proposed Amazon HQ2 campus, is named after him

Henry Sheldon Anable (c. 1815–1887) was a 19th-century land speculator and developer, in what is now New York City, but was then beyomd the city limits in Queens County, New York. The properties he is known for were on the east side of the East River, on Long Island, prior to the annexation of that region into the greater city. He was responsible for the excavation of the short Anable Basin shipping channel.

In the mid 19th century Anable partnered with Eliphalet Nott, a land speculator and developer. Anable was related to Nott, with some sources describing Nott as Anable's father-in-law, and others, as his uncle.

In 1869 Anable was one of those who argued for the amalgamation of the neighboring Long Island communities of Newtown Creek, Astoria, Hunters Point, Ravenswood, Blissville and Dutch Kills.

Anable's ancestors were among the early Puritan settlers of Massachusetts, arriving in 1623. He is a descendant of Anthony Annable who was a passenger of the Anne, which was the third ship to arrive in the Plymouth Colony.
