= Vera Lutter =

German artist in New York City (born 1960)

- Born: 1960 (age 65–66); Kaiserslautern, West Germany
- Education: Academy of Fine Arts, Munich & School of Visual Arts
- Known for: Photography
- Movement: Contemporary art

Vera Lutter (born in Kaiserslautern, in 1960) is a German artist based in New York City. She works with several forms of digital media, including photography, projections, and video-sound installations. Through a multitude of processes, Lutter's oeuvre focuses on light and its ability to articulate the passing time and movement within a tangible image.

== Biography ==
=== Education ===
In 1991 Lutter received her degree from the Academy of Fine Arts, Munich where she trained as a sculptor. Thereafter, she enrolled in the Photography and Related Media program at the School of Visual Arts in New York, earning her MFA in 1995.

=== Work ===
In the early 1990s, inspired by her move to New York and the city's light and architecture, the artist undertook her first experiments with the medium of pinhole photography. To capture a direct imprint of her environment, Lutter transformed the loft in which she lived into a camera obscura. Rather than using an optically carved lens Lutter found her focus through the aperture of a pinhole, projecting inverted images of the outside world onto mural-sized sheets of photographic paper. By exposing images directly onto photo paper instead of film the artist produces unique negative prints in an effort to maintain the immediacy of her images; a departure from the reproducibility associated with conventional photography.

Lutter's most prominent work utilizes a room-sized camera obscura to capture her large black and white negative images. The subject matter of her work varies greatly from urban centers, industrial landscapes, abandoned factories, and transit sites, such as shipyards, airports, and train stations. The artist's home, New York has stayed a recurring subject in her work from many points of view, including Manhattan, the Pepsi-Cola sign in Long Island City, Queens, Ground Zero in Lower Manhattan, the former Nabisco factory in Beacon, as well as documenting the evolution of a construction site seen from her studio window. Lutter has also worked internationally, making images at the Frankfurt airport, the pyramids of Egypt, the Battersea power station in London, Venice, and the Rheinbraun surface mine in Hambach Germany.

In advancement of her process, Lutter has incorporated her camera obscura images into architectural installation works. The first was Linger On in 2005, for which the artist printed a semi-translucent variant of her 1999 photograph of the Friedrichshafen Zeppelin onto large panels of acrylic. Lutter's work often deals with urban landscapes (Venice Portfolios, 2007). Later with Folding Four in One (2009), Lutter captured views from a clock tower in Brooklyn. Situated at the highest part of the building, the interior space of the clock tower is perfectly square with each of its four sides housing a large clock face. Backed with clear glass, each clock facilitates the entrance of light while demonstrating the steady evolution of time. With a camera obscura, Lutter made exposures of four different vistas of New York onto large sheets of film emulsion. The large-scale negatives were thereafter set between pieces of acrylic and installed in a square formation, suspended between floor and ceiling. Each image depicts one cardinal view seen from the tower, offering the experience of inhabiting an alternate time and space. These installation projects not only underscore the monumentality of Lutter's art, but also serve to reiterate the structural potential of light itself as the works become a literal part of the viewer's environment.

But Lutter hasn't always worked exclusively with the camera obscura. In her project Samar Hussein (2009) the names of the estimated 100,000 civilian deaths caused by the American-led war on Iraq since the invasion on 20 March 2003 were accompanied by both printed and projected color images of the Hibiscus flower's life cycle. Lutter first explored the possibilities of color photography with Jai Brooklyn, a project produced in 2003/2009 memorializing the civilian deaths caused by the Iraq War. The names of those lost are displayed along the bottom of a projection of rotating images of a hibiscus plant in various stages of bloom and decay.

One Day stands as Lutter's first and most recent work in video and sound installation. For this piece, the artist made a twenty-four-hour recording in the Petit Camargue nature preserve just outside the French town of Saint-Louis. Through a fixed frame, Lutter captured a full day's cycle with all its subtle transformations in atmosphere.

Concurrently, Lutter pursued new avenues in digital astronomic photography with the creation of Albescent, an ongoing project chronicling the ebb and flow of the moon. Since 2010, the artist has amassed numerous images of the sun and moon from international vantage points building a travel diary that considers the ubiquitous presence of these celestial bodies.

In 2012 Lutter began photographing works of art. This process began first at The Metropolitan Museum in New York, followed by the National Gallery of Art in Washington, D.C., and more recently with a commission from the Museum of Modern Art in New. The resulting works act as both documentation and interpretation of the familiar in an unfamiliar manner. The time it takes to make such images can run as long as seven months and are exposed directly onto black and white photographic paper, leaving them in their negative format.

In 2017 the Los Angeles County Museum of Art (LACMA) invited Lutter to be their first ever artist in residence in response to the Museum's upcoming campus demolition and subsequent renovation. Using her room-size camera obscura process Lutter has been documenting the campus, galleries, and the museum's collection. The project is taking place since February 2017 and culminating in an exhibition in 2020.

== Exhibitions ==
Lutter's images have been exhibited internationally in both group and solo exhibitions, including this select list of exhibitions:

Solo exhibitions

- (2024) Vera Lutter, MAST, Bologna, Italy.
- (2018) Vera Lutter: Turning Time, Gagosian Gallery, Britannia Street, London.
- (2016) Paestum, Galleria Alfonso Artiaco, Naples, Italy.
- (2016) Vera Lutter, Galerie Xippas, Geneva.
- (2016) Inverted Worlds, New Orleans Museum of Art, New Orleans, LA.
- (2015–2016) Inverted Worlds, The Museum of Fine Arts, Houston, TX.
- (2015) Vera Lutter, Gagosian Gallery, New York.
- (2014) Vera Lutter, Galerie Max Hetzler, Berlin, Germany.
- (2012) Vera Lutter, Carré d’Art – Musée d’art contemporain, Nîmes, France.
- (2011) Egypt, Gagosian Gallery, London, UK.
- (2009) Samar Hussein, Carolina Nitsch Project Room, New York.
- (2009) Vera Lutter, Gagosian Gallery, Los Angeles.
- (2007) Vera Lutter, Gagosian Gallery, New York.
- (2005–2006) Vera Lutter, Modern Art Museum of Fort Worth, Fort Worth, TX.
- (2005) Vera Lutter: Nabisco Factory, Beacon, Dia: Beacon, Beacon, NY.
- (2004) Vera Lutter: Battersea, Gagosian Gallery, London.
- (2004) Inside In, Kunsthaus Graz, Graz, Austria.
- (2002) Museum of Contemporary Photography, Chicago.
- (2001) Kunsthalle Basel, Basel, Switzerland, (with Hanspeter Hofmann)
- (1999–2000) Time Traced: Vera Lutter and Rodney Graham, Dia: Chelsea – Dia Center for the Arts, New York City.
- (1996) On New York, Wooster Gardens, New York.

Group exhibitions

- (2018) Sun Pictures Then and Now: Talbot and his Legacy Today, Photo London, London.
- (2017) Painting on Paper: Vera Lutter’s Old Master Photographs, TEFAF, Park Avenue Armory, New York.
- (2016–2017) Photography Reinvented: The Collection of Robert E. Meyerhoff and Rheda Becker, National Gallery of Art, Washington, DC.
- (2016) Deconstruction Photographique, Topographie de L’Art, Paris.
- (2015) Industry, Now: Contemporary Photographs From the Mast Collection, MAST Foundation, Bologna, Italy.
- (2014) Now You See It: Photography and Concealment, The Metropolitan Museum of Art, New York.
- (2012) Project Pour l’Art Contemporain: 10 Ans d’Acquisitions, Centre Pompidou, Paris.
- (2012) Skyscraper: Art and Architecture Against Gravity, Museum of Contemporary Art Chicago, Chicago.
- (2012) Myths and Realities, School of Visual Arts, New York.
- (2011) Legacy: Photographs from the Emily Fisher Landau Collection, Whitney Museum of American Art, New York.
- (2011) Measuring the World: Heterotopias and Knowledge Spaces in Art, Kunsthaus Graz, Graz, Austria.
- (2010–2011) Still / Moving, The Israel Museum, Jerusalem.
- (2010) Crash, Gagosian Gallery, London.
- (2009–2010) Extended Family: Contemporary Connections, Brooklyn Museum, Brooklyn, NY.
- (2009) elles, Centre Pompidou, Paris
- (2008–2009) Images from Venice, Fondation Beyeler, Basel, Switzerland.
- (2002) 2002 Whitney Biennial, Whitney Museum of American Art, New York
- (2001) What’s New: Recent Acquisitions in Photography, Whitney Museum of American Art, New York
- (1999) The Big Picture: Large Format Photography, Middlebury College Museum of Art, Middlebury, VT.
- (1998) About Painting, Part III, Robert Miller Gallery, New York.
- (1997) CityScapes: A Survey of Urban Landscapes, Marlborough Gallery, New York.

=== Special projects ===
- Painting on Paper: Vera Lutter's Old Master Photographs, Residency, Los Angeles County Museum of Art, Los Angeles. (2017–2018)
- Nowhere Near, 601Artspace, New York. Exhibition curated by the artist. (2009–2010)
- Ariadne Unhinged, Gotham Chamber Opera, New York. Set design by the artist, choreographed by Karole Armitage. (2008)

=== Collections ===
Lutter's photographs are held in many permanent collections worldwide such as Art Institute of Chicago; The Israel Museum, Jerusalem; The Los Angeles County Museum of Art (LACMA), Los Angeles; National Gallery of Art, Washington, D.C.; Neue Nationalgalerie, Berlin; The Metropolitan Museum of Art, New York; The Museum of Modern Art, New York; The Solomon R. Guggenheim Museum, New York; and the Whitney Museum of American Art, New York, among others.

=== Awards and nominations ===
- Pollock-Krasner Foundation Grant. (2002)
- John Simon Guggenheim Memorial Foundation Fellowship. (2001)
- Artist-in-Residence, International Artists Studio Program in Sweden (IASPS). (2001)
- Kulturstiftung der ZF Friedrichshafen Grant. (1999)
- International Center for Advanced Studies Grant, Project on Cities and Urban Knowledge, New York University. (1997)
- Deutscher Akademischer Austausch Dienst (DAAD) Grant. (1993)
