= Pepsi-Cola sign =

Landmarked neon sign in Queens, New York

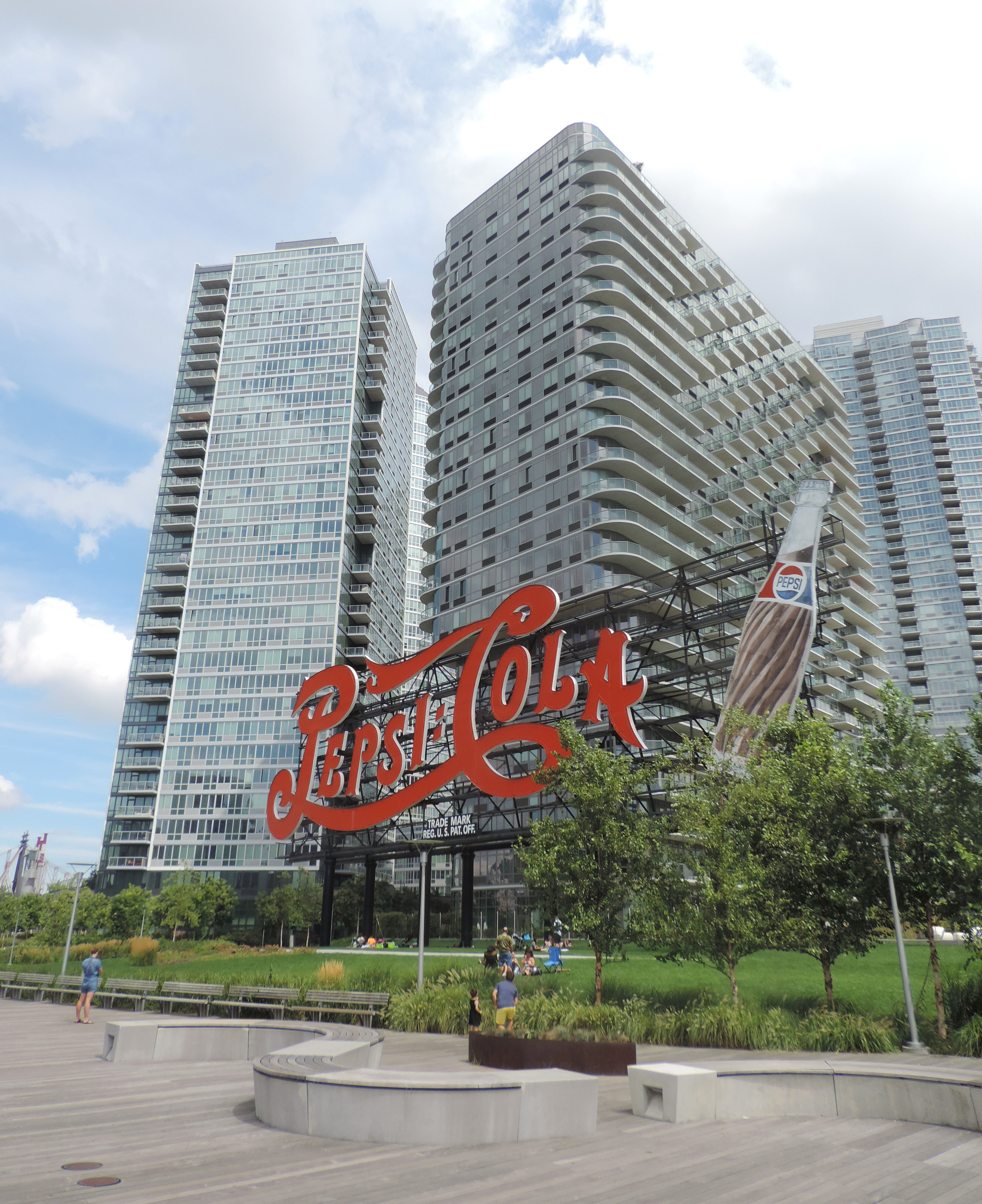
- The sign in 2015

General information
- Location: 4-09 47th Road, Long Island City, New York
- Coordinates: 40°44′51″N 73°57′28″W
- Completed: 1940 (original); 1993 (current)

Design and construction
- Main contractor: General Outdoor Advertising Corporation (original); Artkraft Strauss (current)

New York City Landmark
- Designated: April 12, 2016
- Reference no.: 1653

The Pepsi-Cola sign is a neon sign at Gantry Plaza State Park in the Long Island City neighborhood of Queens in New York City. The sign, visible from Manhattan and the East River, was built in 1940 and originally installed atop PepsiCo (previously Pepsi-Cola)'s bottling factory nearby. It is composed of a 50-foot (15 m) depiction of a Pepsi bottle, as well as lettering that reflected PepsiCo's logo when the sign was commissioned.

The Pepsi-Cola sign was likely manufactured by the General Outdoor Advertising Company and was New York state's longest electric sign when completed. The bottle depiction was replaced in the 1970s, and Artkraft Strauss Sign Corporation rebuilt the rundown sign in 1993. When the Pepsi facility was closed in 2003, the sign was relocated to the park. The New York City Landmarks Preservation Commission began holding hearings on whether to make the sign a city landmark in 1988, though it was not designated as such until 2016.

== Design ==
The original sign was manufactured by the General Outdoor Advertising Corporation and installed atop the Pepsi-Cola plant at 46th Avenue and 5th Street. It faced west toward the headquarters of the United Nations in Manhattan. The sign read Pepsi:Cola 5c, measured 60 by 120 feet (18 by 37 m), and had a 50-foot (15 m) depiction of a Pepsi bottle. The characters "5c" were in blue, with blue neon light tubes, while the other letters were red with red neon, like the current sign. The Pepsi bottle was 5 inches (130 mm) deep, and illuminated by a pair of 400-watt (0.54 hp) lamps. At the time of the original sign's erection in 1940, Pepsi-Cola had changed its logo the previous year, with a blue outline around the letters of the logo. The removal of the blue outline in 1940 may have influenced the Pepsi-Cola sign's use of red neon tubing.

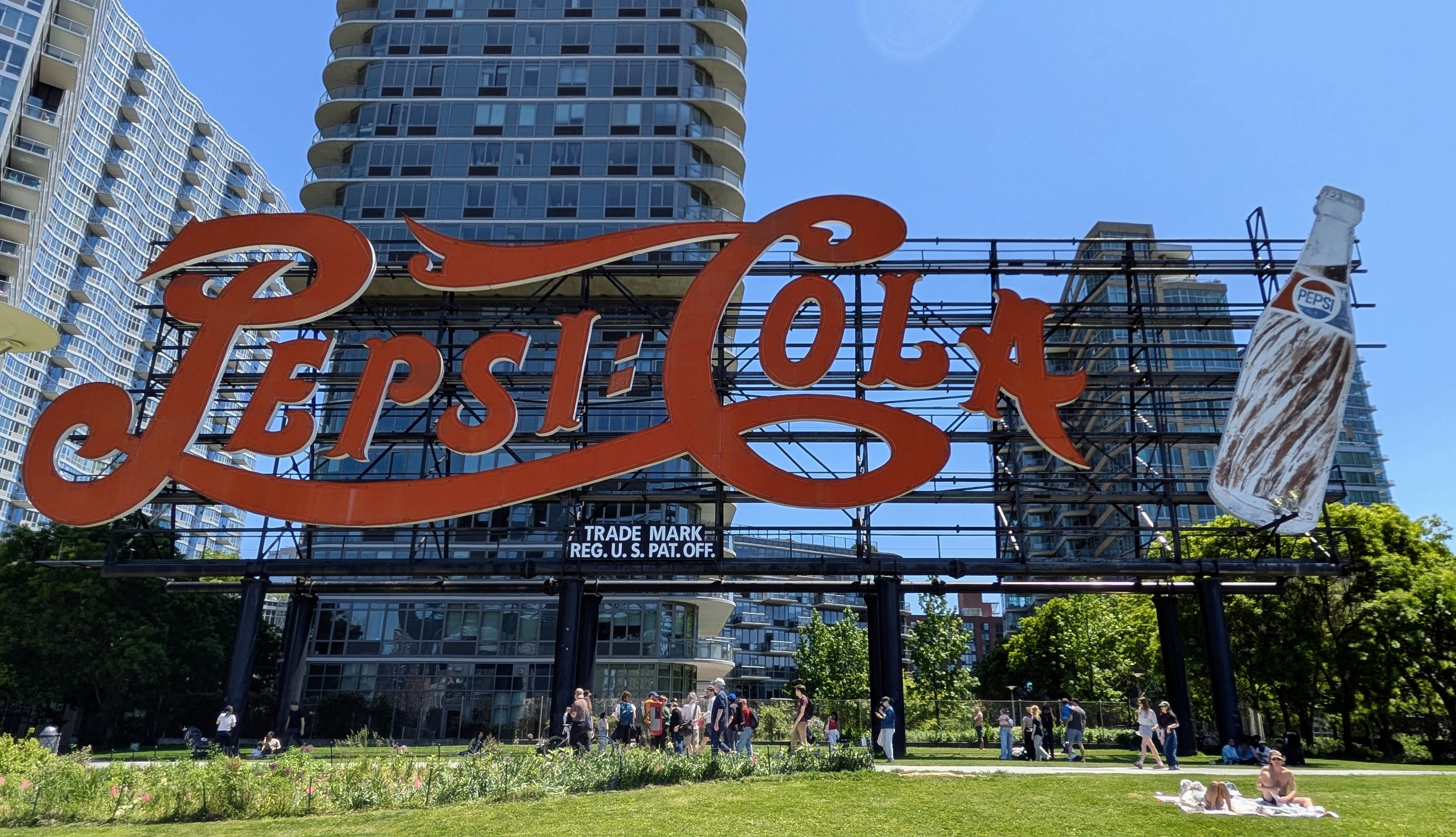
A close up of the Pepsi-Cola sign

The Artkraft Strauss Sign Corporation created the current 1994 sign, which faces west toward the United Nations in Manhattan. It is mounted on a steel grid measuring 49 feet (15 m) tall and 150 feet (46 m) wide. The logo consists of the letters Pepsi:Cola, which are mounted at least 20 feet (6.1 m) above grade and reaching nearly 70 feet (21 m) high. The letters are painted red and aluminum, with 15-millimeter (0.59 in) neon light tubes at the letters' edges. The "P" and "C" are the tallest letters, being 44 feet (13 m) high. A painted aluminum Pepsi bottle is to the right of the letters, with neon light tubes at its edge, and is 50 feet (15 m) tall. It is painted in the style of a Pepsi bottle from the 1970s. The only major difference is the Pepsi bottle depiction, which is 9.5 inches (240 mm) deep because it accommodates an electrical cabinet. The sign's foundations are made of 40 pilings sunken into the layer of underlying bedrock, each of which has four 5-foot-tall (1.5 m) concrete pile caps.

== History ==
Long Island City was developed as a commercial and industrial center in the late 19th and early 20th centuries because it was close to Manhattan and on the East River. Pepsi-Cola was one of the firms that developed factories within Long Island City. In 1937, it purchased three land lots on the East River from Socony-Mobil to expand its Queens operations. It had previously occupied a plant further inland at 47-51 33rd Street.

=== Original sign ===
The sign was placed atop Pepsi-Cola's Long Island City plant by August 30, 1940, as part of an expansion of its plant. At the time, it was advertised as New York state's longest electrical sign. Documents show that the New York City Department of Buildings approved a permit for the sign in May 1940. The sign's construction came at a time when industrial concerns in Long Island City installed large signs atop their buildings, which would be highly visible from Manhattan, the Queensboro Bridge, the Long Island Rail Road, or elevated New York City Subway lines. The city's regulations of the time, including the 1916 Zoning Resolution, banned commercial signs from residential districts, and later limited their surface area to 500 square feet (46 m^{2}) and their height to 40 feet (12 m) above curb level. These regulations strongly affected the placement of such signs.

The characters "5c" were removed when the price of Pepsi-Cola was raised in the mid-1940s. The bottle design was changed to a contemporary design around the 1970s. By the late 20th century, many of the industrial concerns on Long Island City's waterfront had started to move elsewhere. The area was slated for redevelopment as part of the Queens West development project.

The New York City Landmarks Preservation Commission (LPC) first considered the sign for city-landmark status in April 1988. At the time, a PepsiCo spokesman said that since the sign was "almost an icon", the company had chosen to not update the sign to reflect its modern logo. Claire Shulman, the borough president of Queens, proposed moving the sign elsewhere because it would interfere with the Queens West development. PepsiCo objected to this, saying that the company alone controlled the sign's status. At a public hearing held for the sign, two speakers including the Queens borough president's office spoke in opposition to the designation. The LPC did not vote on the designation due to a lack of interest from board members. At the time, and up through the late 1990s, the LPC had never designated a solitary sign as an individual city landmark.

=== Restoration and landmark status ===
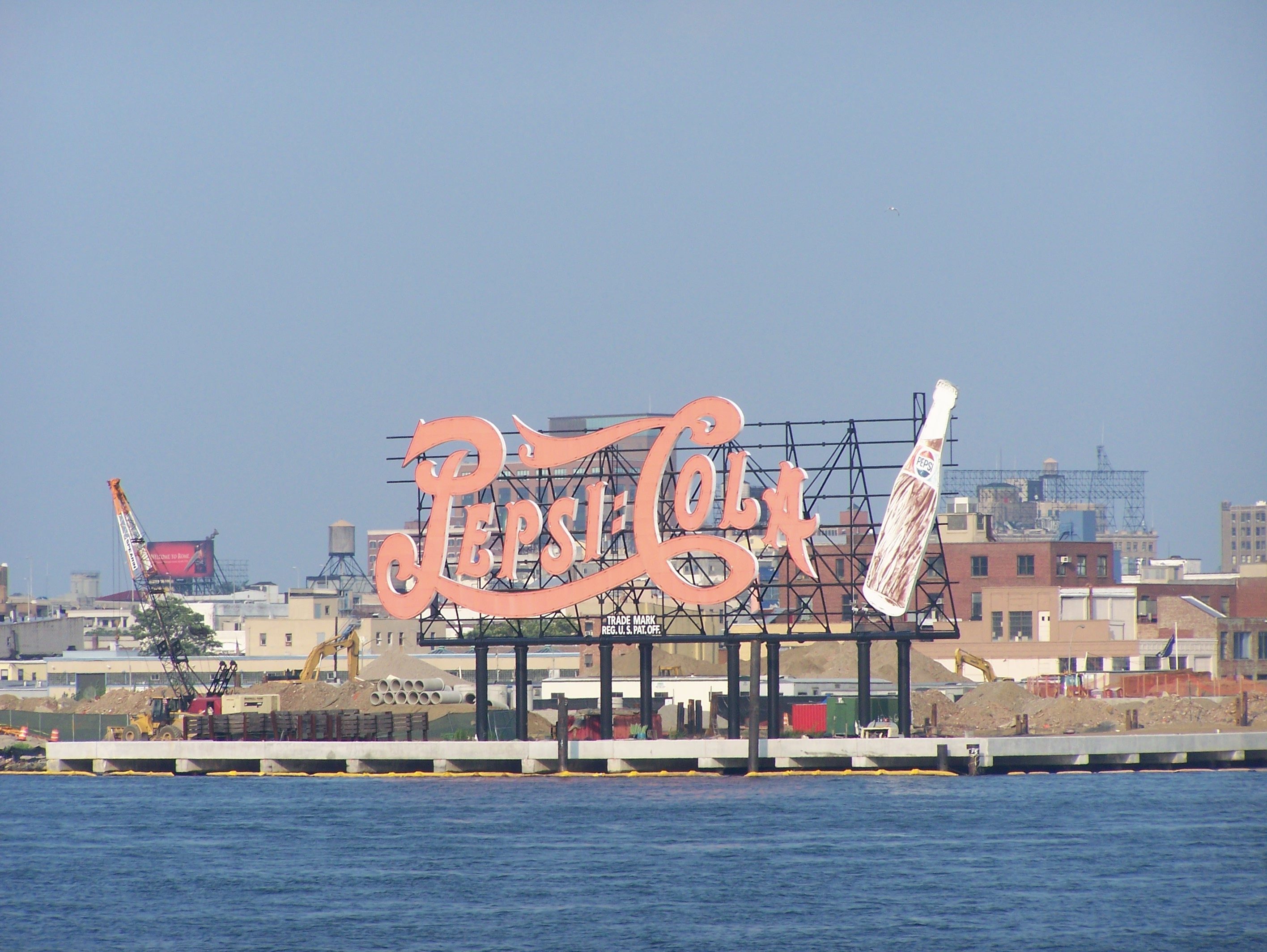
Seen in a temporary location in 2006

The original sign was nearly destroyed in the December 1992 nor'easter, and by the end of 1993, the entire sign had been removed. Artkraft Strauss rebuilt the sign in its Manhattan plant, with lettering resembling the original sign. A city spokesperson was quoted as saying, "To change that sign would mean losing a little bit of the texture of New York". Because the LPC had still "calendared" the sign for designation, it was still considering the sign as a landmark, and so aspects of the reconstruction had to be approved by the LPC. By 2000, PepsiCo announced plans to vacate its bottling facility. PepsiCo, Queens West, and the LPC all advocated for the Pepsi-Cola sign to be preserved, with the LPC holding another hearing on whether to preserve the sign. PepsiCo moved all its Queens operations to College Point, and the PepsiCo plant's site was subsequently to become part of the northern portion of Gantry Plaza State Park.

PepsiCo sold its bottling plant in 2003. However, the company stipulated that the sign should remain part of Long Island City's waterfront, and retained ownership of the sign. PepsiCo also kept ownership of a tract of land near its facility, measuring 200 by 60 feet (61 by 18 m), for the sign. In 2004, the PepsiCo sign was relocated 300 feet (91 m) to the south, next to Gantry Plaza State Park, and a new base was constructed. The temporary relocation was necessitated because of the demolition of the plant and subsequent construction of Gantry Plaza State Park. The process of removal and deconstruction was documented by photographer Vera Lutter. The sign was then relocated to its original position again in 2008, and was dismantled by late 2008 in preparation for the reinstallation in its permanent position. In early 2009, the sign was reassembled in its permanent location in Gantry Plaza State Park. PepsiCo continued to maintain the sign. The nearby 46-10 Center Boulevard development, within Hunter's Point South immediately east of the park, recessed its lowest eight stories by 12 feet (3.7 m) so that the facade would be 45 feet (14 m) behind the sign.

In late 2015, the LPC hosted a public hearing on whether to designate the Pepsi-Cola sign as a city landmark; most comments supported the designation, but some parties including the sign's owner opposed it. This was part of a review of 95 listings that had been calendared by the LPC for several decades but never approved as city landmarks. The Pepsi-Cola sign was designated a New York City landmark in June 2016. Under LPC regulations, landmarks typically had to be 30 years old, although the reconstructed sign' as its design was historically accurate at the time that the latter was destroyed. A JetBlue logo was temporarily installed under the Pepsi-Cola sign between August and October 2019 as part of a promotion approved by the LPC. The presence of the JetBlue sign was criticized by residents as well as online commentators. In 2024, the sign was featured in the Sony Pictures and Marvel Studios movie Madame Web.

== See also ==
- List of New York City Designated Landmarks in Queens
