= Artkraft Strauss =

American Company

- Industry: Signage
- Founded: 1897
- Founder: Benjamin Strauss
- Headquarters: Manhattan, New York
- Website: www.artkraft.com

Artkraft Strauss is a sign design and consulting company headquartered in Manhattan, New York. Throughout the 20th century, the company was the preeminent designer and creator of Times Square's iconic signs and displays. These included the “smoking” Camel sign, which wafted giant smoke rings over the Square; the Bond Clothing Stores display, a block-long extravaganza with a perpetual waterfall; and the high-neon north-Square “spectaculars” created for Canadian Club and Admiral Television. For almost a century, Artkraft Strauss was also responsible for the annual midnight ball drop that signaled the new year’s arrival.

== History ==
Artkraft Strauss began as Strauss Signs. Founded in 1897 by artisan Benjamin Strauss, the company furnished New York’s retailers with posters and painted show cards. By the 1910s and 20s, Strauss signs, applying the innovative methods of a Ukrainian immigrant named Jacob Starr, had become the Square’s principal builder of theater marquees and entertainment displays, including the original marquee for the New Amsterdam Theatre. In the 1920s Starr left Strauss to start his own engineering firm in association with the Artkraft Company of Lima, Ohio, a leading maker of neon lighting, a newly minted technology. Starr formed Artkraft-New York, and in 1931 merged with his old employer, Strauss, creating Artkraft Strauss. The company occupied its block-wide manufacturing facility at 57th Street and the West Side Highway for 75 years, until 2001, when it moved its operations to Queens. By the 1950s, Artkraft Strauss had dominated the outdoor advertising market in Times Square, and was known worldwide.

Artkraft Strauss maintained its singular presence in Times Square after neon had been eclipsed by electronic technologies, a process that began in the 1980s, and was thus involved in the area’s rebirth after years of deterioration. Chief among its work from this period are the block-long news and stock tickers on the Morgan Stanley Building, and the 1992 Coca-Cola sign in the northern part of Times Square, which featured state-of-the-art digital technology. It also rebuilt the Pepsi-Cola sign in Long Island City, Queens, in 1993. After divesting itself of its manufacturing facilities and the majority of its outdoor advertising locations in 2006, Artkraft Strauss became a design and project management consultant. It also established an archive of its photos and other memorabilia, a collection spanning over a century of New York City commercial and esthetic history. Today, the company maintains a small number of billboards, and provides a variety of sign designer and consulting services to architects, historians, designers, and other outdoor advertising companies.

The works of Artkraft Strauss are not limited to just New York City. It fabricated the 120-by-70-foot (36.58-by-21.34-meter) neon sign for the Domino Sugars plant in Baltimore's Inner Harbor which was first illuminated on April 25, 1951. The neon tubing was replaced by LED lighting when the sign was modernized in 2021.

== Bibliography ==
- McKendry Joe, "One Times Square: A Century of Change at the Crossroads of the World," David R. Godine, 2012
- Darcy Tell, Times Square Spectacular, Smithsonian Books, 2007
- Lynne B. Sagalyn, Times Square Roulette, The MIT Press, 2001
- Tama Starr and Edward Hayman, Signs and Wonders, Currency Doubleday, 1998
- Kenneth T. Jacobson, The Encyclopedia Of New York, Yale University Press, 1995
- William R. Trevor, Inventing Times Square, Russel Sage Foundation, 1991
