= De la Canal =

De la Canal is a Spanish surname. Notable people with the surname include:

- Agustín de la Canal (born 1980), Argentine football player
- José de la Canal (1768–1845), Spanish ecclesiastical historian
- Ramón Alva de la Canal (1892–1985), Mexican painter

== See also ==
- Canal
- Canal (surname)
- Canals (surname)
