= Kanal =

In several European languages, kanal means canal or television channel. Kanal may also refer to:

== Places ==
- Kanal, Zagreb, a city neighbourhood in Croatia
- Kanal, Iran, a village in Sistan and Baluchestan Province, Iran
- Municipality of Kanal ob Soči, in western Slovenia
- Kanal, Kanal, or Kanal ob Soči, a settlement in Slovenia

== Films ==
- Kanał, a 1956 Polish film directed by Andrzej Wajda
- Kanal (1979 film), a 1979 Turkish film
- Kanal (2015 film), a 2015 Indian Malayalam-language film starring Mohanlal

== People ==
- Kanal Kannan, Indian actor
- Paulo Cardoso (born 2006), Cape Verdean footballer nicknamed Kanal

== Other ==
- Kanal (unit), a unit of area equivalent to one-eighth of an acre, used in northern India and Pakistan
- Kanal (museum), a contemporary art museum in Brussels
- Kanal Architecture, a cultural institution in Brussels

== See also ==
- Kanal (surname)
- Canal (disambiguation)
