= Canal Street =

Canal Street may refer to:

== Places ==
=== United Kingdom ===
- Canal Street, Manchester, Greater Manchester, England
- Canal Street, Oxford, Jericho, Oxfordshire, England

=== United States ===
- Canal Street (Buffalo), a street and district at the western terminus of the Erie Canal in Buffalo, New York
- Canal Street, New Orleans, New Orleans, Louisiana
- Canal Street (Manhattan), New York City
  - Canal Street station (New York City Subway), a station complex in the Chinatown neighborhood of Manhattan, consisting of:
    - Canal Street station (IRT Lexington Avenue Line), serving the 4, 6, and <6> trains
    - Canal Street station (BMT Nassau Street Line), serving the J and Z trains
    - Canal Street station (BMT Broadway Line), serving the N, R, and W trains
    - Canal Street station (BMT Manhattan Bridge Line), serving the N and Q trains
  - Canal Street station (IND Eighth Avenue Line), a station at Sixth Avenue in Manhattan; serving the A, C, and E trains
  - Canal Street station (IRT Broadway–Seventh Avenue Line), a station at Varick Street in Manhattan; serving the 1 and 2 trains
  - Canal Street station (IRT Second Avenue Line), a former elevated station in Manhattan serving the IRT Second Avenue Line
  - Canal Street station (IRT Third Avenue Line), a former elevated station in Manhattan serving the IRT Third Avenue Line
- Canal Street station (LIRR), a former Long Island Rail Road station in Queens serving the Main Line and Montauk Branch

== Film ==
- Canal Street (film)

== Music ==
- Canal Street (Arendal, Norway), jazz and blues festival in southern Norway
- "Canal St.", 2015 song by A$AP Rocky from the album AT.LONG.LAST.A$AP.
- "Canal Street", 2025 song by Sombr from I Barely Know Her.

== Sports ==
- Canal Street (Runcorn), defunct football and rugby ground in Runcorn, England

== See also ==
- Canal Road (disambiguation)
- Canal (disambiguation)
- Street (disambiguation)
