= Canals (surname) =

Canals is a Spanish surname. Notable people with the surname include:

- B. de Canals, 14th-century Spanish author of a Latin chronicle
- José Canals (1914–1937), Spanish cross-country skier
- José Maria Canals (1898–1951), Spanish doctor and footballer
- Maria Canals, several people
- Ricard Canals (1876–1931), Spanish Impressionist painter, illustrator, and engraver
- Steven Canals (born 1980), American screenwriter and producer

== See also ==
- Canal
- Canal (surname)
