= Canal Road =

Canal Road is a street name in various locations, including the following:

- Canal Bank Road, Lahore, Punjab, Pakistan
- Canal Bank Road, Faisalabad, Punjab, Pakistan.
- Canal Road, Bradford West Gwillimbury in Bradford West Gwillimbury, Ontario, Canada
- Canal Road (Washington, D.C.), U.S.A.
- Canal Road, Hong Kong
- Canal Road (Pune)
- Canal Road (Jammu District, Jammu & Kashmir), India
- Open Canal Road, Cavite, Philippines

== Entertainment ==
- Canal Road (TV series), an Australian television drama series on the Nine Network

== Politics ==
- Canal Road (constituency), a constituency of Wan Chai District

== See also ==
- Canal Street (disambiguation)
