= Canal (disambiguation) =

A canal is a human-made channel for water.

Canal or Canals may also refer to:

== People ==
- Canal (surname)
- Canals (surname)

== Places ==
- Canal Flats, British Columbia, a village in British Columbia, Canada
- Canal Fulton, Ohio, United States
- Canal Street (disambiguation), name of numerous roads and neighborhoods
- Canal Township, Venango County, Pennsylvania, United States
- Canal Winchester, Ohio, United States
- Canals, Tarn-et-Garonne, a commune in the Tarn-et-Garonne department, France
- Canals, Valencia, a municipality in the province of Valencia, Valencian Community, Spain
- Petit-Canal, a commune in the department of Guadeloupe, France
- Canal San Bovo, municipality in Trentino in the northern Italian Region Trentino-Alto Adige/Südtirol
- Canal station (CTA Metropolitan Main Line)
- Canal station, a Lake Street Elevated station

=== Fjords ===
- Behm Canal, U.S. state of Alaska
- Gardner Canal, British Columbia, Canada
- Hood Canal, U.S. state of Washington
- Lynn Canal, U.S. state of Alaska
- Pearse Canal, part of the Canada-United States border at Alaska
- Portland Canal, British Columbia, Canada

== Arts, entertainment, and media ==
=== Films ===
- The Canal (1979 film), a 1979 Turkish film
- The Canal (2014 film), a 2014 Irish film

=== Television ===
- Canal 13 (disambiguation), several television stations in the Americas
- Canal Digital, a pay TV and Internet service provider in Norway and Sweden
- Canal+ (Spanish satellite broadcasting company), a satellite television broadcasting company in Spain
- Canal+, a French premium pay television channel
- Canal+ 1, a Spanish commercial television channel
- Canal+ Group, a French film and television studio
- Canal+ Poland, a television network in Poland
- Canal Channel, an Egyptian regional television channel

=== Music ===
- "Canal", a song by Bright from their self-titled album
- "Canals", a song by All Time Low from Don't Panic

== Biology and healthcare ==
- Canal (anatomy), numerous structures that connect parts of the human body
- Ear canal, a tube running from the outer ear to the middle ear
- Knallgas, sometimes misspelt as "canal gas" or "canalgas," a term used in microbial metabolism
- Siphonal canal, an extension of the aperture in gastropod molluscs
- Root canal, a term in dentistry

== Other uses ==
- Canal (garden history) shorter canals in formal gardens, mostly of the 16-18th centuries
- Martian canals, a 19th and early 20th century belief that canals exist on Mars

== See also ==
- Calanque, a steep-walled inlet, cove, or bay
- Channel (disambiguation)
- El Cañal (disambiguation)
- Kanal (disambiguation)
- Lists of canals
