= City Hall station (BMT Broadway Line) =

New York City Subway station in Manhattan

City Hall
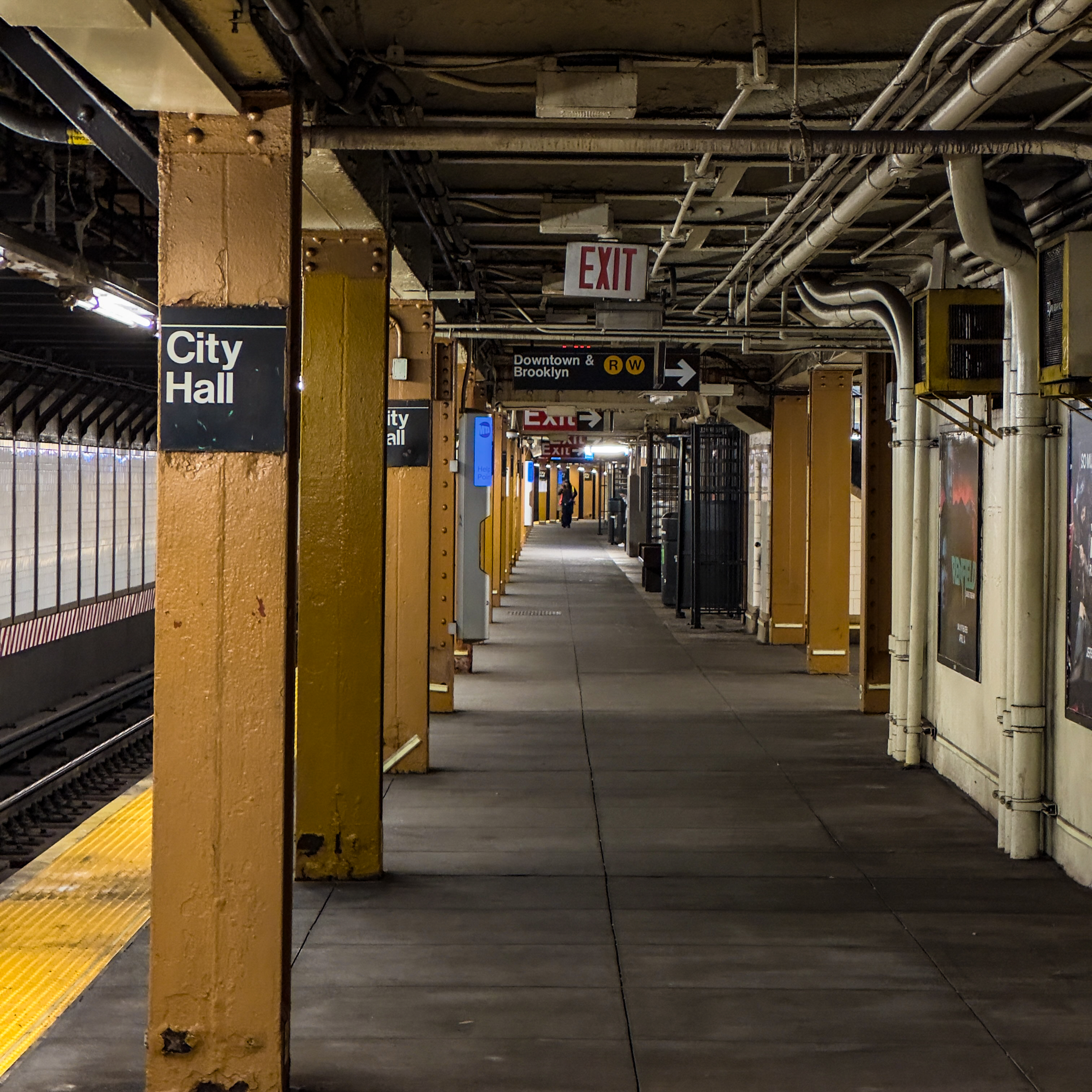
- View from the northbound side of the platform towards the south end.

Station statistics
- Address: Murray Street & Broadway; New York, New York
- Borough: Manhattan
- Locale: Civic Center, Tribeca
- Coordinates: 40.71324°N 74.007082°W
- Division: B (BMT)
- Line: BMT Broadway Line
- Services: N (late nights); R (all except late nights); W (weekdays only)
- Transit: NYCT Bus: M9, M22, M55, M103, X27, X28, SIM2; MTA Bus: BxM18
- Structure: Underground
- Levels: 2 (lower level not for passenger service)
- Platforms: 2 island platforms (1 on upper level, 1 on lower level)
- Tracks: 5 (2 on upper level, 3 on lower level)

Other information
- Opened: January 5, 1918; 108 years ago

Traffic
- 2025: 1,165,756 ▼1.8%
- Rank: 283 out of 423
Services
Preceding station	New York City Subway	Following station
Canal Street N R W via Lexington Avenue–59th Street	R (New York City Subway service) W (New York City Subway service)	Cortlandt Street N R W via Whitehall Street–South Ferry
Location
Location within New York City Subway
Location within New York City
Location within New York
Track layout
Street map
Station service legend
Symbol	Description
Stops all times except late nights	Stops all times except late nights
Stops weekdays during the day	Stops weekdays during the day
Stops late nights only	Stops late nights only

The City Hall station is a local station on the BMT Broadway Line of the New York City Subway in Tribeca and Civic Center, Manhattan. It is served by the W train on weekdays, and by the R train at all times except late nights, when the N train takes over service.

== History ==
The Brooklyn Rapid Transit Company's, later Brooklyn–Manhattan Transit Corporation (BMT)'s, Broadway Line was built as four tracks south to City Hall, where the local tracks were to terminate on the upper level, and the express tracks were to use the lower level, curving through Vesey Street into Church Street. However, the final plan had the express tracks splitting at Canal Street and passing under the northbound local track to the Manhattan Bridge. The tracks via Canal Street and the Manhattan Bridge were supposed to be a crosstown line continuing further west, but the Broadway Line connection allowed through operation from the BMT Fourth Avenue Line in Brooklyn to go into operation more than a year earlier than would otherwise have been possible. As such, the express tracks north of Canal Street were connected to the Manhattan Bridge instead. The tunnel south of City Hall was rebuilt to bring the upper local tracks down to the lower level north of Vesey Street, and the lower level at City Hall was never used for passenger service, instead being used for train storage.

The Broadway Line, initially comprising a short section north of Canal Street, was extended south to Rector Street on January 5, 1918, including the City Hall station. Local service henceforth ran between Times Square and Rector Street. The station's platforms originally could only fit six 67-foot-long (20 m) cars. In 1926, the New York City Board of Transportation received bids for the lengthening of platforms at nine stations on the Broadway Line, including the City Hall station, to accommodate eight-car trains. Edwards & Flood submitted a low bid of $101,775 for the project. The platform-lengthening project was completed in 1927, bringing the length of the platforms to 535 feet (163 m). The city government took over the BMT's operations on June 1, 1940.

== Station layout ==
=== Upper level ===
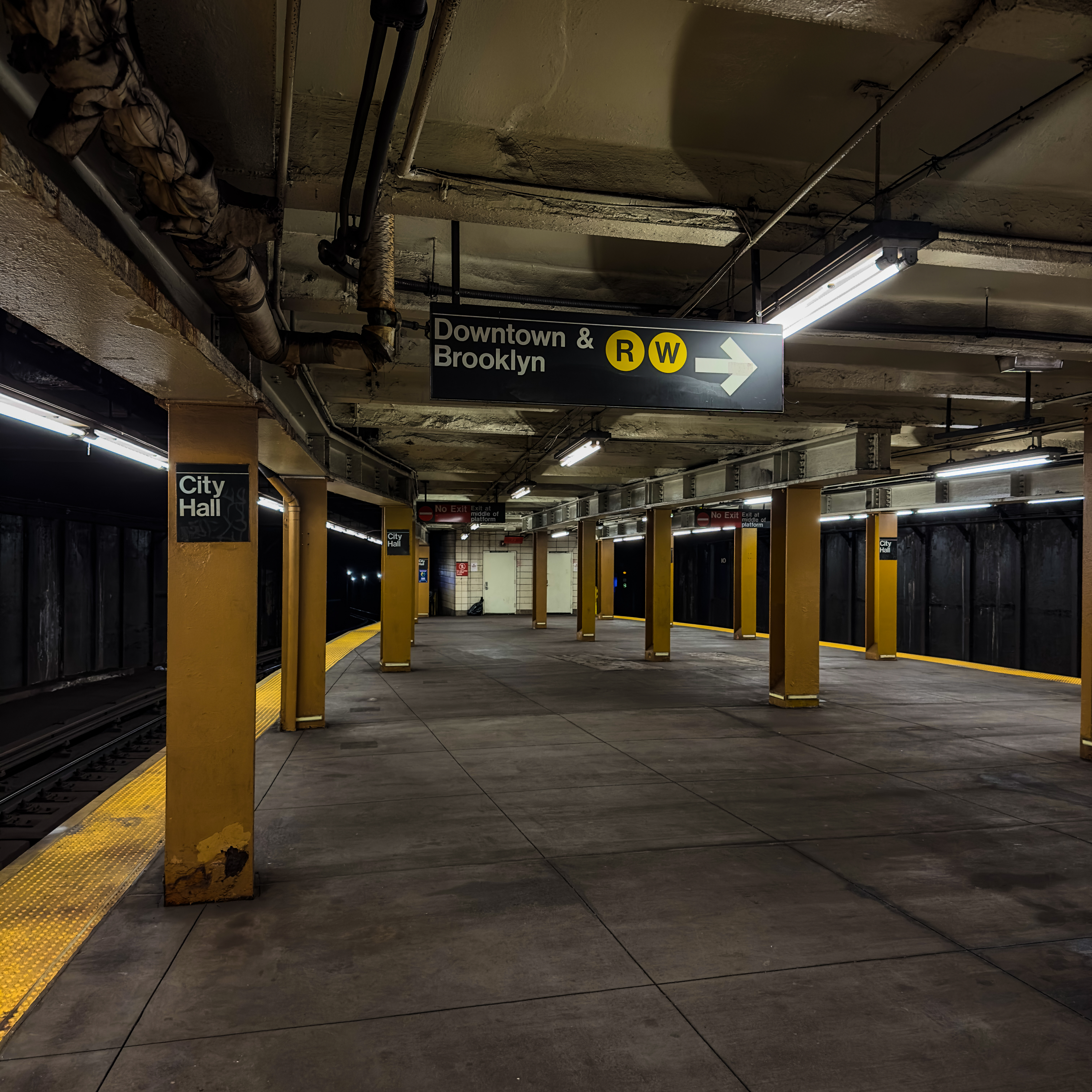
The south end of the platform

There are two tracks and a very wide island platform. The northbound track is located under City Hall Park, while the southbound track is under the east side of Broadway.

There is an active tower at the north end, with a window that lets any waiting passengers observe Transit Authority goings-on. The platform tapers off toward the southern end, where the northbound and southbound portions join. The station's configuration, and the wide-open staircases to the sky above, is responsible for another distinguishing feature: the number of birds that fly into and around the station.

This station was overhauled in the late 1970s, changing the station's structure and overall appearance. It replaced the original wall tiles, old signs, and incandescent lighting with more modern wall tiles, signs and fluorescent lights, as well as fixing staircases and platform edges.

Before the new City Hall master tower was built, there was a provision at the north end of the upper level for a diamond crossover (which has existed since the construction of this station, when the upper level platform was to be a terminal) which is now occupied by a relay room. At the south end of the station, the uptown track curves away from the wall; this dates from the original construction when the upper level was converted from a terminal, with presumably a straight line, to a through station with a single two-track tunnel.

South of this station, the line utilizes a sharp reverse curve, first turning west under Vesey Street, then turning south under Church Street toward Cortlandt Street.

==== Exits ====
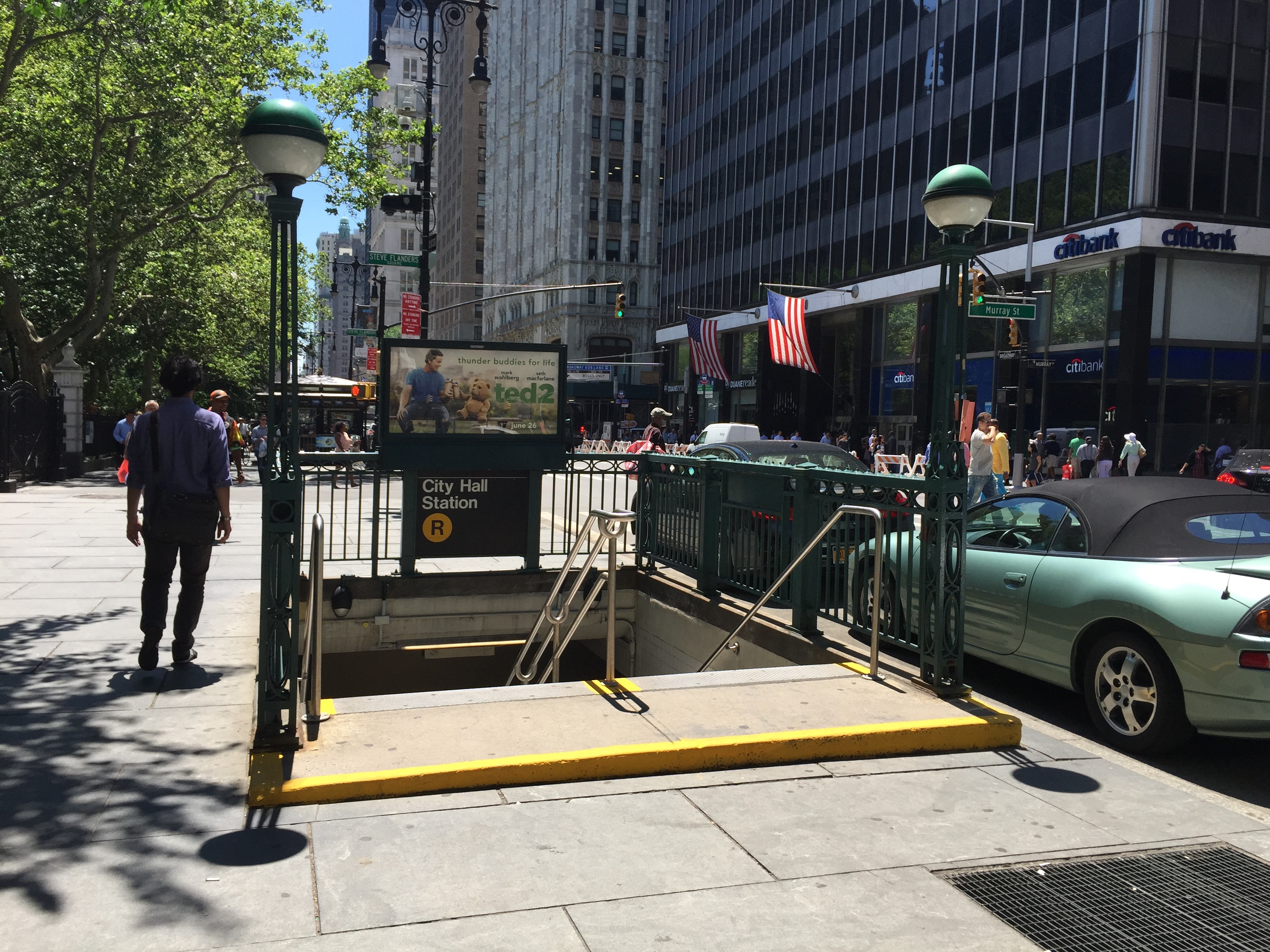
The entrance at Murray Street

The fare control area is located in the center of the platform and fenced off from the rest of the platform area, has exits on either end. At the north end, two exits lead to the east side of Broadway at Warren Street, and at the south end, one exit leads to the east side of Broadway at Murray Street. Passengers enter from the sidewalk adjacent to City Hall Park directly onto the wide island platform on the upper level.

An exit at the south end of the platform led to the Woolworth Building, but this was closed in 1982 due to concerns over crime.

=== Lower level ===
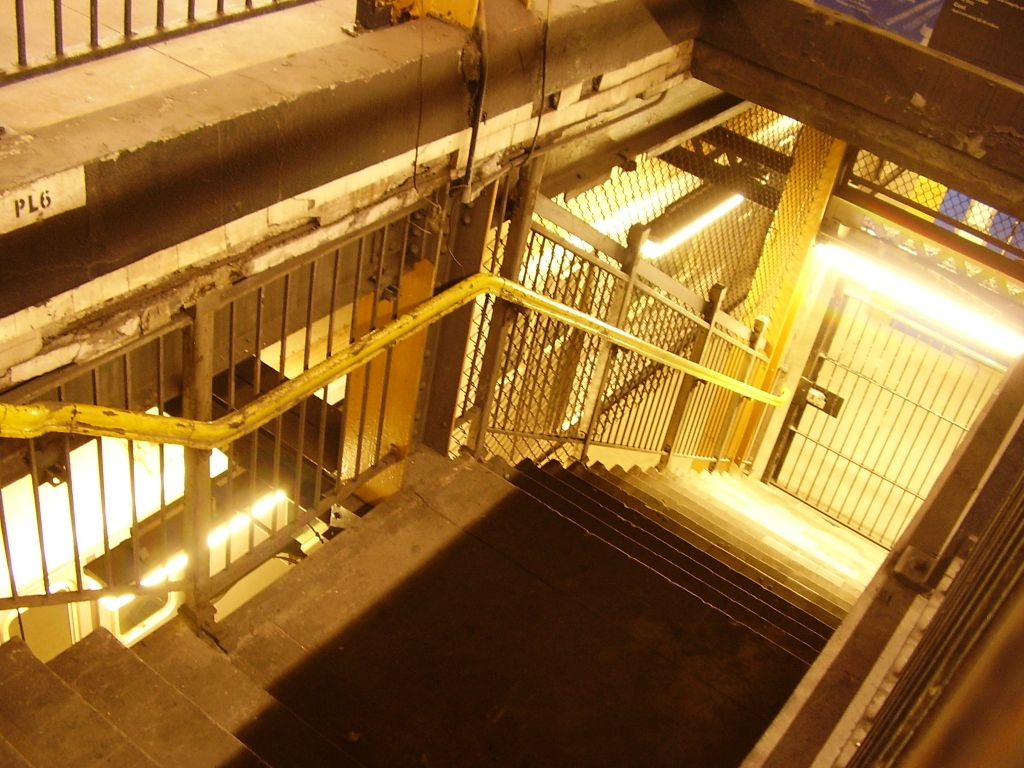
Staircase leading to the lower level platform

The City Hall station is a bi-level station, with an unused two-island platform, three-track lower level reachable from a single staircase from about the center of the in-use upper platform. The staircase leads to the western platform; the eastern platform was never finished and does not have a usable stairway. The middle track in the lower level station was to be used for short turns from either direction depending on the service pattern, with a layout much like that at Whitehall Street–South Ferry station further south.

It was initially intended that the local trains were to terminate on the upper level, while the express trains using the lower level would continue on through lower Manhattan and then through the Montague Street Tunnel. However, plans were changed before construction ended. As a result, the lower level of the station is unused (except for non-rush hour storage of trains), as are the stub-end center express tracks at Canal Street on its upper level (the connections to which were instead "temporarily" rerouted to the Manhattan Bridge for service across that bridge). Another effect of this change is that the southern end of the upper level station slopes downward. This is a result of platform lengthening and rerouting the upper level downward toward the south, rather than letting the lower level stay at the same elevation and continue south through lower Manhattan. The lower level floor continues south of the station until it disappears under the increasingly low ceiling under the ramps carrying the upper level downgrade. The lower level was never used for passenger service or even finished with tiles and signage. Only the western platform was fully completed; the shorter eastern platform was never finished.

The lower level is only long enough to store 480-foot-long (150 m) 8-car trains, with cars of 60 feet (18 m) lengths, like the platforms in the BMT Eastern Division. Only two of the three tracks are usable: the westernmost and the center tracks, which are used to store trains. The easternmost track on the lower level is unusable as it has no third rail; it was removed at an unknown date.

== In popular culture ==
In Chuck Hogan and Guillermo del Toro's novel The Strain, it is by trekking through the disused City Hall station's lower levels that Dr. Goodweather, Setrakian and Fet find their way towards the Master's lair. Though not mentioned by name, the station also appears in episode 11 of the TV series' first season.

In the Fantastic Beasts and Where to Find Them film one of the final scenes is located in the 1920s subway station.
