= Prince Street station =

New York City Subway station in Manhattan

Prince Street
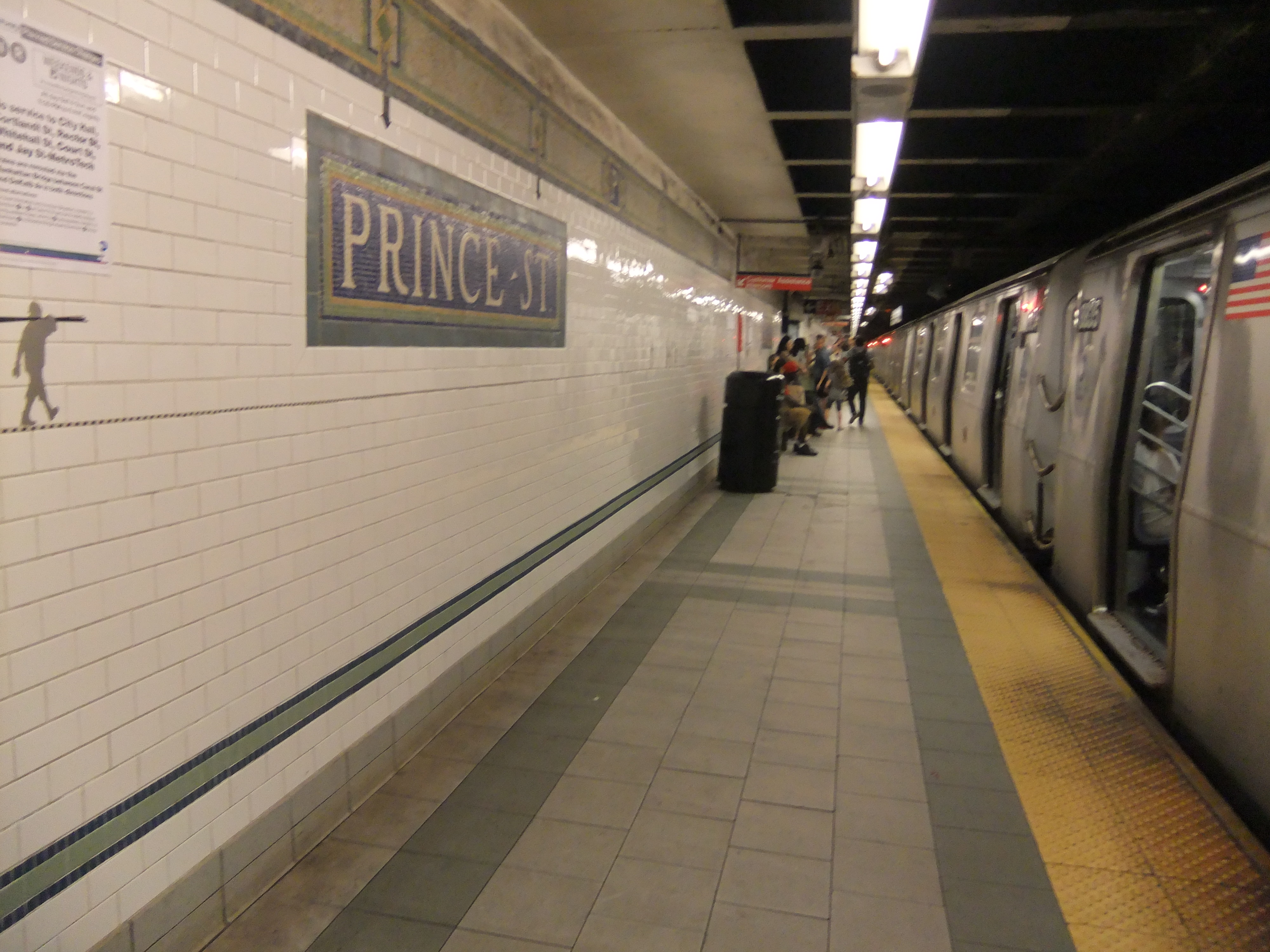
- View of the Downtown platform

Station statistics
- Address: Prince Street & Broadway; New York, New York
- Borough: Manhattan
- Locale: SoHo
- Coordinates: 40.724202°N 73.997812°W
- Division: B (BMT)
- Line: BMT Broadway Line
- Services: N (weekends and late nights); Q (late nights only); R (all except late nights); W (weekdays only)
- Transit: NYCT Bus: M1, M55, X27, X28, SIM1, SIM1C, SIM3C, SIM4C, SIM33C, SIM34
- Structure: Underground
- Platforms: 2 side platforms
- Tracks: 4

Other information
- Opened: September 4, 1917; 109 years ago

Traffic
- 2025: 3,616,693 ▲12.8%
- Rank: 99 out of 423
Services
Preceding station	New York City Subway	Following station
Eighth Street–New York University N Q R W via Lexington Avenue–59th Street	R (New York City Subway service) W (New York City Subway service)	Canal Street N R W via Whitehall Street–South Ferry
Eighth Street–New York University N Q R W via Lexington Avenue–59th Street	R (New York City Subway service) W (New York City Subway service)	Canal Street N Q via bridge
Location
Location within New York City Subway
Location within New York City
Location within New York
Track layout
Street map
Station service legend
Symbol	Description
Stops all times except late nights	Stops all times except late nights
Stops weekdays during the day	Stops weekdays during the day
Stops weekends during the day	Stops weekends during the day
Stops late nights and weekends	Stops late nights and weekends
Stops late nights only	Stops late nights only

The Prince Street station is a local station on the BMT Broadway Line of the New York City Subway. Located at Prince Street in SoHo, Manhattan, it is served by the R train at all times except late nights, the W train on weekdays, the N train during late nights and weekends, and the Q train during late nights.

The station opened in 1917, had its platforms extended in the late 1960s, and was renovated in the late 1970s and in 2001.

== History ==
Prince Street opened on September 4, 1917, as part of the first section of the BMT Broadway Line from Canal Street to 14th Street–Union Square. The station's platforms originally could only fit six 67-foot-long (20 m) cars. In 1926, the New York City Board of Transportation received bids for the lengthening of platforms at nine stations on the Broadway Line, including the Prince Street station, to accommodate eight-car trains. Edwards & Flood submitted a low bid of $101,775 for the project. The platform-lengthening project was completed in 1927, bringing the length of the platforms to 535 feet (163 m).

The city government took over the BMT's operations on June 1, 1940. In the late 1960s, New York City Transit extended the platforms for 10 car trains, and fixed the station's structure and the overall appearance. The station was overhauled in the late 1970s. The original trim lines were replaced with white cinderblock tiles, except for small recesses in the walls, which contained yellow-painted cinderblock tiles. The staircases were repaired and new platform edges were installed. The yellow cinderblock field contained the station-name signs and black text pointing to the exits. The renovation also replaced incandescent lighting with fluorescent lighting.

In 2001, the station received a major overhaul. This project included restoration of the station's original tiling as well as upgrades such as platform widening.

== Station layout ==
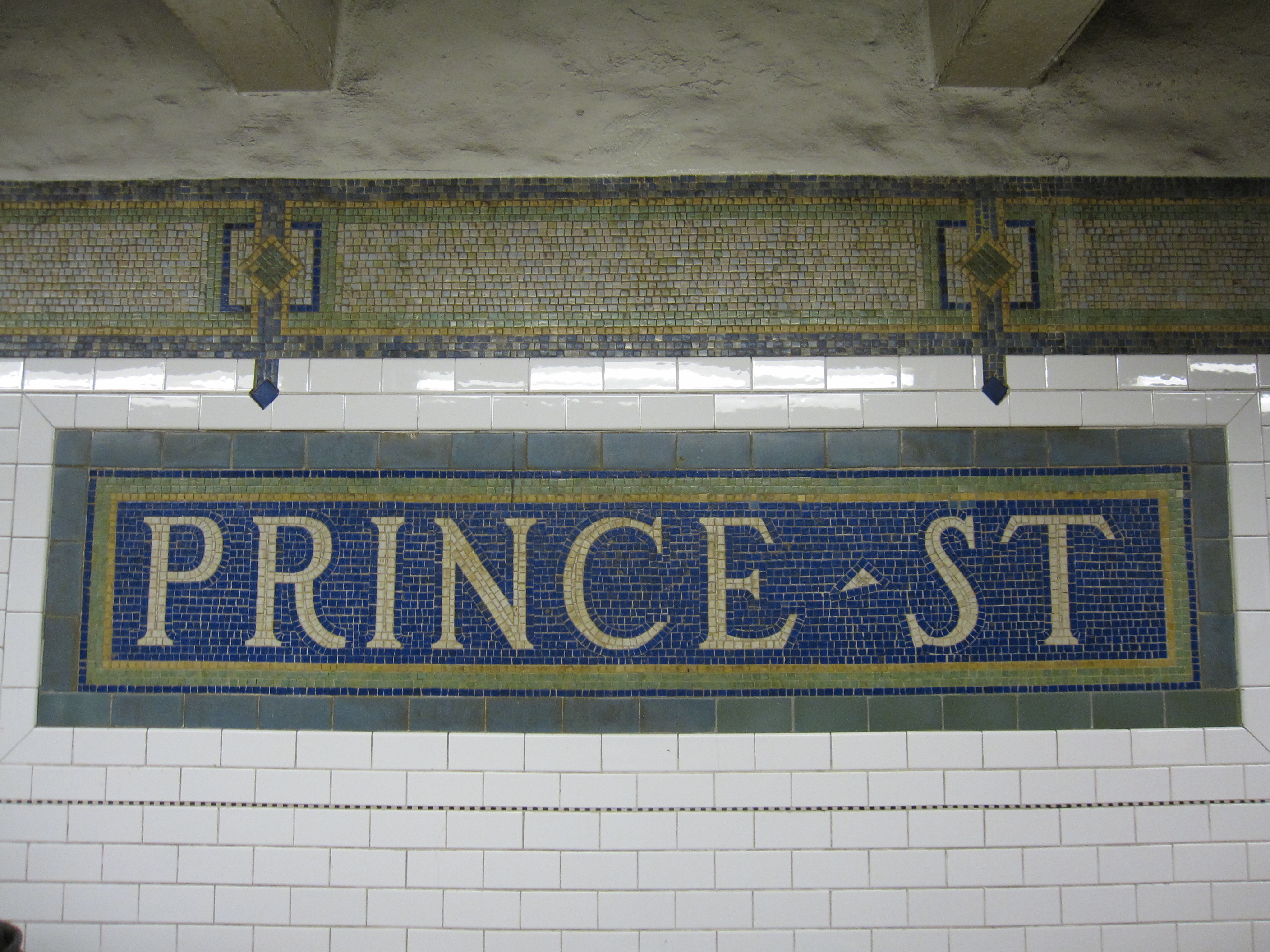
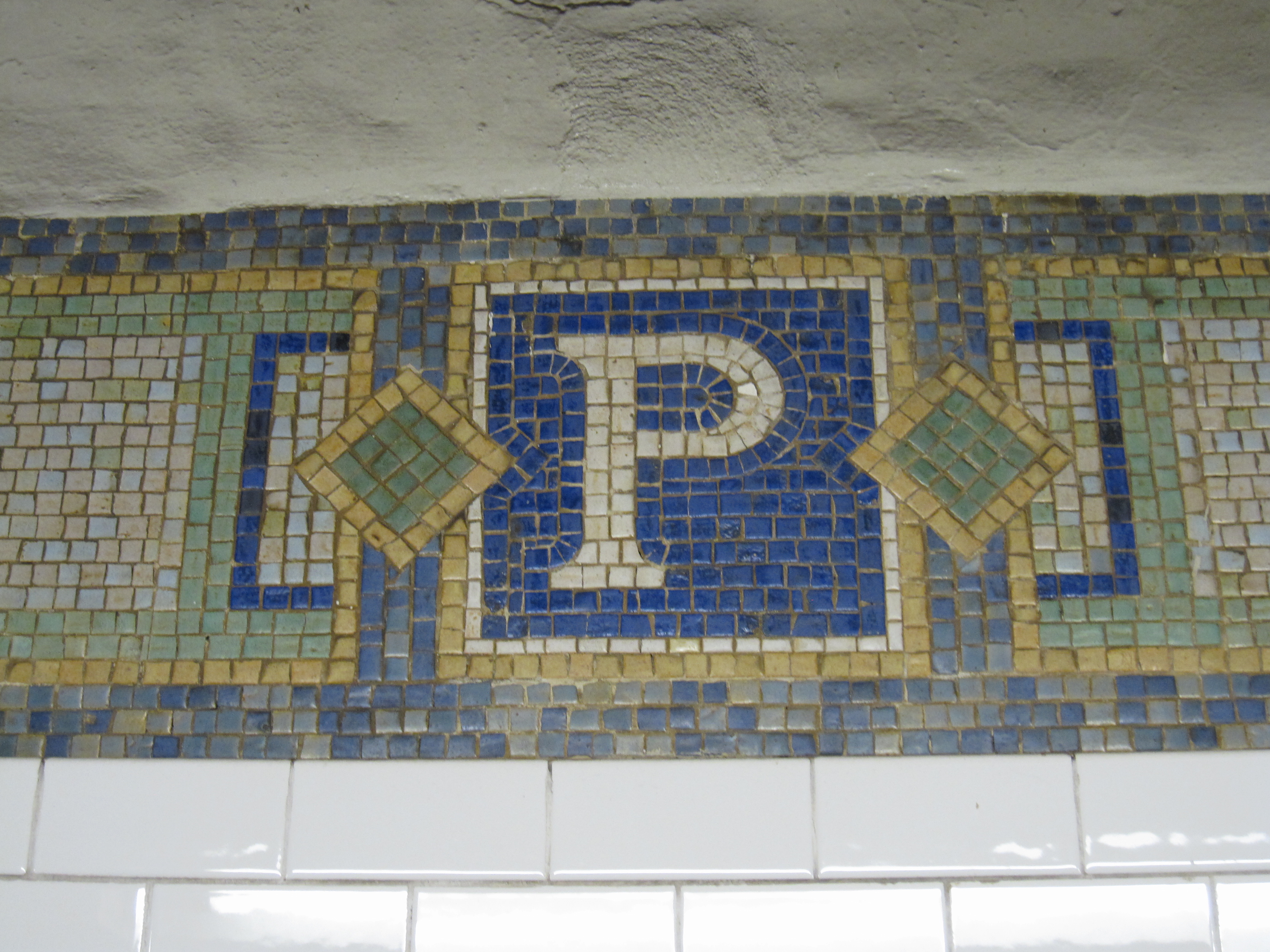
Mosaic and frieze

This underground station has two side platforms and four tracks, the inner two of which are express tracks that do not serve the station. South of Prince Street, there are diamond crossovers between both directional pairs of local and express tracks. A punch box is located at the south end of the southbound platform to allow weekend N and late-night Q trains to cross the Manhattan Bridge.

The 2004 artwork, Carrying On, is by Janet Zweig. It uses water jet-cut steel, marble, and slate to create a mural along the entire length (totaling 1,200 feet) of both platforms. The 194 different frames in this frieze detail contain images of New Yorkers from all walks of life. As the title suggests, almost all of the images involve carrying something.

=== Exits ===
Fare control for each platform is at platform level. There is no free transfer between directions. Outside of fare control, the northbound platform has one street stair to either eastern corner of Broadway and Prince Street, while the southbound platform has one street stair to either western corner of that intersection.
