= Canal (surname) =

Canal is a Spanish surname. Notable people with the surname include:

- David Canal (born 1978), Spanish sprinter
- Esteban Canal (1896–1981), Peruvian chess player
- Giovanni Antonio Canal (1697–1768), Venetian painter, better known as Canaletto
- Marguerite Canal (1890-1978), French conductor, music educator and composer
- Richard Canal (born 1953), French science fiction writer

== See also ==
- Canal
- De la Canal
- Canals (surname)
