= Kanal (surname) =

Kanal is a surname. Notable people with the surname include:

- Izrael Kanal (died (Note: presumed) 1943), Jewish resistance soldier in the Warsaw Ghetto
- Sameer Kanal (fl. 2025), American politician
- Tony Kanal (born 1970), British-American musician, songwriter and record producer
