= Maria Canals =

Maria Canals may refer to:

- Maria Canals-Barrera née Canals (born 1966), American actress
- Maria Antònia Canals (1930–2022), Catalan teacher
- Maria Canals (pianist) (1914–2010), Catalan pianist
