= José de la Canal =

Spanish ecclesiastical historian

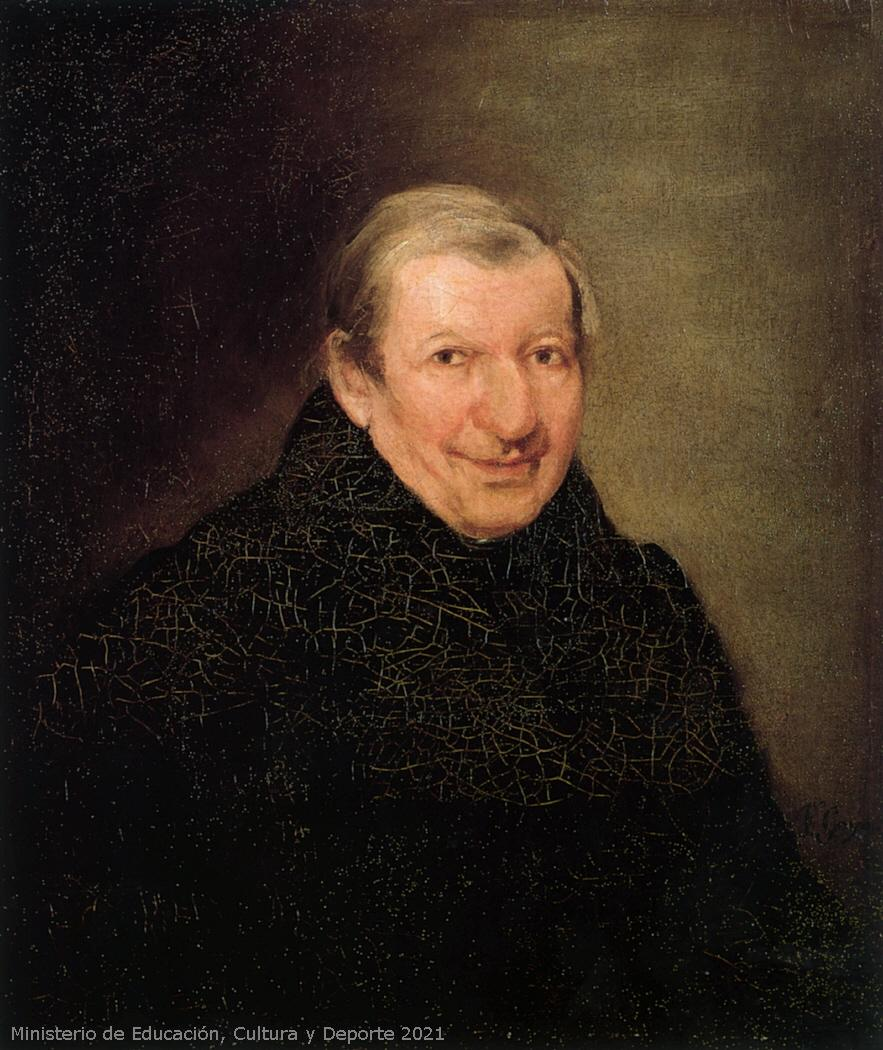
José de la Canal (c.1826), by Francisco de Goya (Museo Lázaro Galdiano, Madrid).

José de la Canal (11 January 1768 – 17 April 1845) was a Spanish ecclesiastical historian.

== Biography ==
He was born to poor parents, in Ucieda, Ruente, a village in Cantabria, Spain. Under the care of an uncle, an Augustinian friar, he studied in the Dominican and Augustinian convents of Burgos; at Burgos, in 1785, he was formally received into the Augustinian Order. Subsequently, he became professor of philosophy, first at the convent of his order at Salamanca, and then at Burgos.

Returning from the latter place to Salamanca, he was librarian of the university, from 1789 to 1800. After spending four years in Toledo, he came to Madrid, where he taught philosophy in the College of San Isidro. On account of certain articles in a paper of liberal tendencies called El Universal, he was, on the return to Spain of King Ferdinand VII, confined for one year in a convent near Ávila. At the end of this period, he returned to Madrid and with his brother Augustinian, Antolin Merino, was appointed by the King to continue the monumental España Sagrada (Holy Spain), begun in 1743 by the Augustinians Henrique Flórez and Manuel Risco. This valuable collection of documents and researches relating to Spanish ecclesiastical history had already reached its forty-second volume. The work embraces an account of the foundation and vicissitudes of all Spanish dioceses, the succession of the Spanish hierarchy, the most important monasteries, and other matters of interest to the Spanish Church studied in their original sources. From the time of his appointment de la Canal devoted himself to his task.

In order to collect material for the publication, he undertook two journeys into Catalonia, making his headquarters at Barcelona and Girona, and working in the archives of these cities. In conjunction with Merino he published vols. XLIII-XLIV of the "España Sagrada" in Madrid in 1819; vols. XLV-XLVI (Madrid, 1826–32) were due to de la Canal alone. These volumes deal with the churches and monasteries of the diocese of Girona, and contain many hitherto unpublished documents and critical investigations. To his collaborator, de la Canal dedicated a biographical study in his Ensayo histórico de la vida literaria del Maestro Fr. Antolin Merino (Madrid, 1830); he also published a second edition, greatly enlarged by himself, of the Clave historial (Key to History) by Flórez (Madrid, 1817) and a Manual del Santo Sacrificio de la Misa (Madrid, 1817, 1819). He translated from the French various theological and historical works, and was successively corresponding member, treasurer, censor, and director of the Royal Academy of History. He belonged to the Academy of Natural Science of Madrid, to the Academy of Belles-Lettres of Barcelona, and to the Antiquarian Society of Normandy.

De la Canal was reportedly noted for charity to the poor. He refused the See of Girona in 1836, notwithstanding the entreaties of Queen Isabella II, excusing himself on the count of age and ill health, and declaring he believed he could better serve God and his country if he continued to devote the remainder of his life to historical research. He died in Madrid in 1845.
