= B. de Canals =

Spanish historian

B. de Canals was a 14th-century Spanish author of a Latin chronicle. The initial B. may possibly stand for Bernat.

== Literature ==
- David Garrido Valls (2010). "B. de canals". In Dunphy, Graeme (ed.). Encyclopedia of the Medieval Chronicle. Leiden: Brill. p. 139. ISBN 90-04-18464-3.
