= Agustín de la Canal =

Argentine footballer (born 1980)

Personal information
- Full name: Agustín de la Canal
- Date of birth: November 10, 1980 (age 45)
- Place of birth: Azul, Argentina
- Height: 1.76 m (5 ft 9 in)
- Positions: Defender; midfielder

Senior career*
Years	Team	Apps	(Gls)
1999–2003	Ferro Carril Oeste	0	(0)
2003–2004	Sportivo Italiano	0	(0)
2004–2005	Deportivo Morón	0	(0)
2005–2007	Ferro Carril Oeste	0	(1 [E.C])
2007	Olympiakos Nicosia	0	(0)
2008	Nueva Chicago	0	(0)
2008–2009	Almirante Brown	0	(0)
2009–2011	Club Comunicaciones		
2011–	Club Atlético Douglas Haig		
- * Club domestic league appearances and goals as of 29 August 2007

Agustín de la Canal (born 10 November 1980) is a retired Argentine football player. He started his career with Argentine football club Ferro Carril Oeste some of his former clubs also include Olympiakos Nicosia and Club Deportivo Morón.
