= El Cañal =

El Cañal may refer to a pair of villages in Cuba:

- El Cañal, Pinar del Río Province, (Latitude (DMS): 22° 28' 60 N Longitude (DMS): 83° 22' 60 W)
- El Cañal, Holguín Province, (Latitude (DMS): 20° 41' 60 N Longitude (DMS): 75° 17' 60 W)
