= Canal Street station (New York City Subway) =

New York City Subway station in Manhattan

Canal Street
- New York City Subway station complex
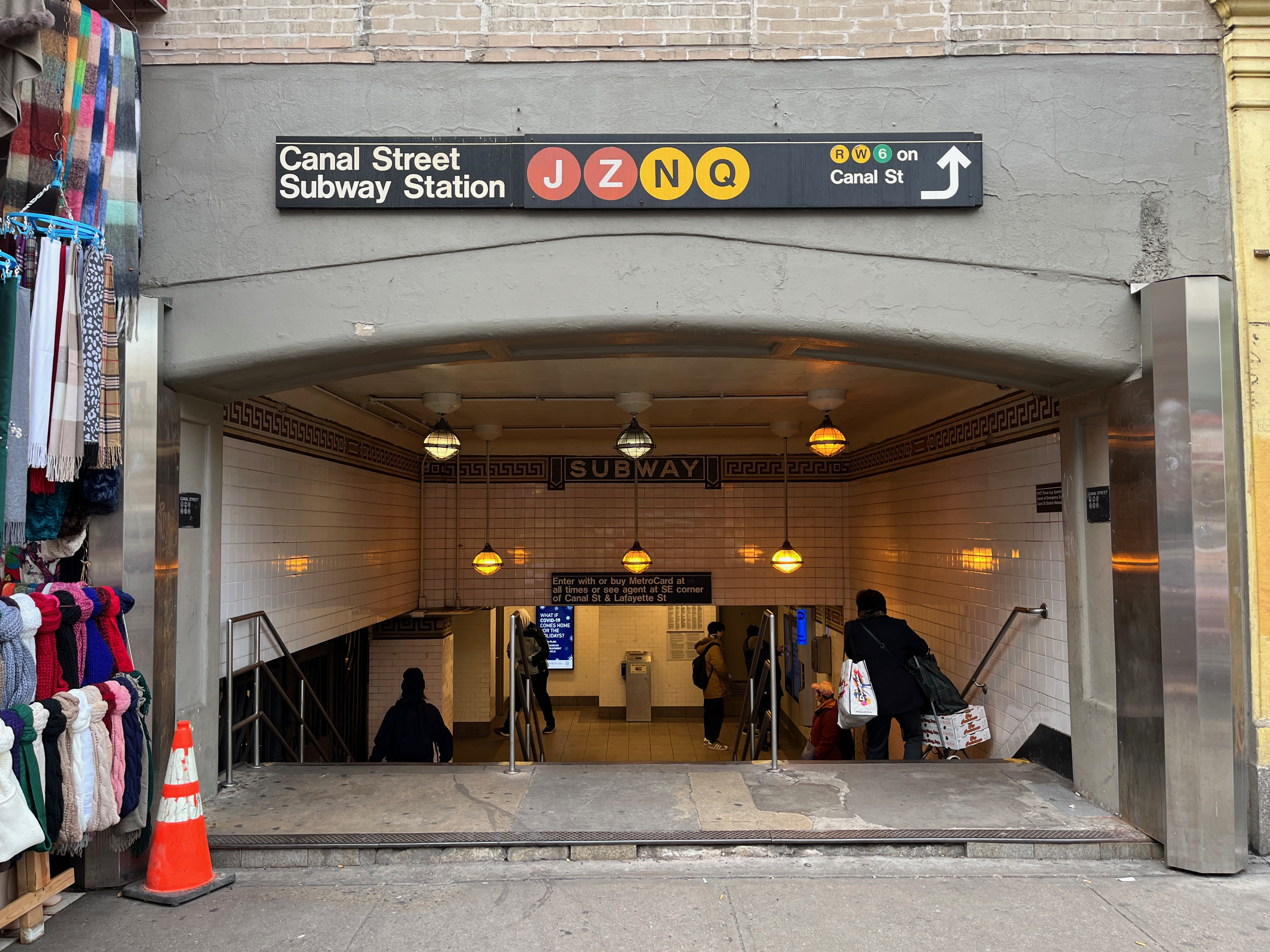
- Entrance on Centre Street

Station statistics
- Address: Canal Street between Broadway & Centre Street; New York, New York
- Borough: Manhattan
- Locale: Chinatown, Little Italy, SoHo
- Coordinates: 40°43′5″N 74°0′0″W
- Division: A (IRT), B (BMT)
- Line: BMT Broadway Line; IRT Lexington Avenue Line; BMT Nassau Street Line
- Services: 4 (late nights); 6 (all times) <6> (weekdays until 8:45 p.m., peak direction); J (all times); N (all times); Q (all times); R (all except late nights); W (weekdays only); Z (rush hours, peak direction)
- Transit: NYCT Bus: M55, X27, X28; MTA Bus: BxM18
- Structure: Underground
- Levels: 2 (Manhattan Bridge platforms cross at an angle and under the other three lines)

Other information
- Opened: September 4, 1917; 109 years ago (connection between BMT Manhattan Bridge & Nassau St Lines); January 16, 1978; 48 years ago (connection to IRT)
- Accessible: Partially; full access planned (IRT Lexington Avenue Line platforms only)

Traffic
- 2025: 12,103,129 ▲10%
- Rank: 14 out of 423
Location
Location within New York City Subway
Location within New York City
Location within New York
Street map
Station service legend
Symbol	Description
Stops all times	Stops all times
Stops all times except late nights	Stops all times except late nights
Stops late nights only	Stops late nights only
Stops rush hours in the peak direction only	Stops rush hours in the peak direction only

The Canal Street station is a New York City Subway station complex. It is located in the neighborhoods of Chinatown and SoHo in Manhattan and is shared by the BMT Broadway Line, the IRT Lexington Avenue Line, and the BMT Nassau Street Line. It is served by the 6, J, N, and Q trains at all times; the R train at all times except late nights; the W train during weekdays; the <6> train during weekdays in the peak direction; the Z train during rush hours in the peak direction; and the 4 train during late nights.

The complex comprises four stations, all named Canal Street; the Broadway Line's local and express tracks stop at separate sets of platforms. The Lexington Avenue Line platforms were built for the Interborough Rapid Transit Company (IRT), and was a local station on the city's first subway line. That station opened on October 27, 1904, as one of the original 28 stations of the New York City Subway. The other three stations were built for the Brooklyn Rapid Transit Company (BRT; later the Brooklyn–Manhattan Transit Corporation, or BMT) as part of the Dual Contracts. The Nassau Street Line station opened on August 4, 1913; the Broadway Line express station opened on September 4, 1917; and the Broadway Line local station opened on January 5, 1918. The IRT and BMT stations were connected in 1978. Several modifications have been made over the years, including a full renovation between 1999 and 2004.

The Lexington Avenue Line station, under Lafayette Street, has two side platforms and four tracks; express trains use the inner two tracks to bypass the station. The Nassau Street Line station, under Centre Street, has two island platforms and three tracks, but only one platform and two tracks are in use. The Broadway local station, under Broadway, has two side platforms and four tracks, the inner two of which are not in use. The Broadway express station, under Canal Street, has two side platforms and two tracks, running at a lower level than the other three sets of platforms. The Lexington Avenue Line platforms contain elevators from the street, which make it compliant with the Americans with Disabilities Act of 1990, but the other platforms are not wheelchair-accessible. Accessibility to the rest of the station complex has been proposed under the MTA's 2025–2029 Capital Program.

== History ==
=== First subway ===
Planning for a subway line in New York City dates to 1864. However, development of what would become the city's first subway line did not start until 1894, when the New York State Legislature passed the Rapid Transit Act. The subway plans were drawn up by a team of engineers led by William Barclay Parsons, the Rapid Transit Commission's chief engineer. It called for a subway line from New York City Hall in lower Manhattan to the Upper West Side, where two branches would lead north into the Bronx. A plan was formally adopted in 1897, and all legal conflicts over the route alignment were resolved near the end of 1899. The Rapid Transit Construction Company, organized by John B. McDonald and funded by August Belmont Jr., signed the initial Contract 1 with the Rapid Transit Commission in February 1900, in which it would construct the subway and maintain a 50-year operating lease from the opening of the line. In 1901, the firm of Heins & LaFarge was hired to design the underground stations. Belmont incorporated the Interborough Rapid Transit Company (IRT) in April 1902 to operate the subway.

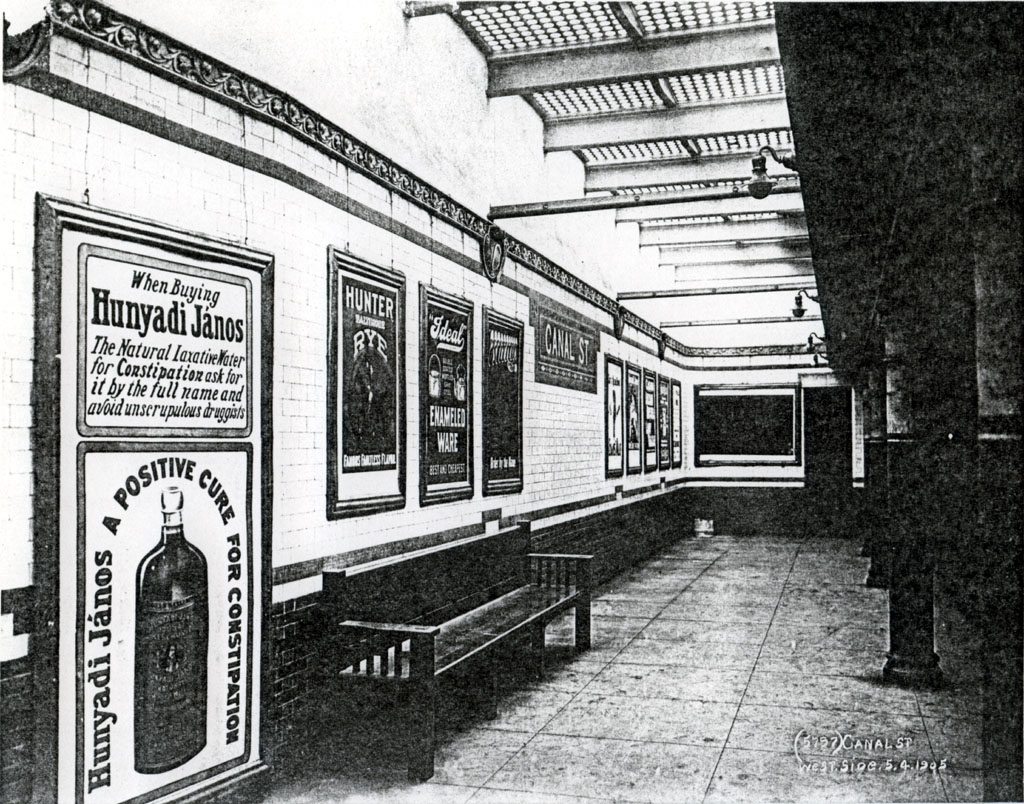
1905 photo of the IRT station with the skylights that were once present in the station

The Canal Street station was constructed as part of the route segment from Chambers Street to Great Jones Street. Construction on this section of the line began on July 10, 1900, and was awarded to Degnon-McLean Contracting Company. Near Canal Street the subway passed through a drainage sewer (the namesake of Canal Street), which had drained the old Collect Pond and continued west to the Hudson River. Because engineers had expected to find quicksand near the pond's site, contractors waited to construct the section between Pearl and Canal Streets; work on this segment had not even begun by early 1902. Workers found that the ground was sturdier than expected, consisting of "good, coarse gravel", and they discovered tree trunks and human bones, as well as artifacts such as coins, silverware, keys, and steel tools. In addition, the ground was still muddy enough that workers had to pump out water. With the IRT's construction, the sewer was redirected east into the East River. The new brick sewer was circular and measured 5.5 ft (1.7 m) across, expanding to 6.5 ft (2.0 m) at Chatham Square. Pumps were used to keep the excavation clear of water while the work proceeded. By late 1903, the street surface above the station had been restored and repaved. The subway was nearly complete, but the IRT Powerhouse and the system's electrical substations were still under construction, delaying the system's opening.

The Canal Street station opened on October 27, 1904, as one of the original 28 stations of the New York City Subway from City Hall to 145th Street on the Broadway–Seventh Avenue Line. After the first subway line was completed in 1908, the station was served by local trains along both the West Side (now the Broadway–Seventh Avenue Line to Van Cortlandt Park–242nd Street) and East Side (now the Lenox Avenue Line). West Side local trains had their southern terminus at City Hall during rush hours and South Ferry at other times, and had their northern terminus at 242nd Street. East Side local trains ran from City Hall to Lenox Avenue (145th Street).

To address overcrowding, in 1909, the New York Public Service Commission proposed lengthening the platforms at stations along the original IRT subway. As part of a modification to the IRT's construction contracts made on January 18, 1910, the company was to lengthen station platforms to accommodate ten-car express and six-car local trains. In addition to $1.5 million (equivalent to $51.8 million in 2025) spent on platform lengthening, $500,000 (equivalent to $17.3 million in 2025) was spent on building additional entrances and exits. It was anticipated that these improvements would increase capacity by 25 percent. Platforms at local stations, such as the Canal Street station, were lengthened by between 20 and 30 feet (6.1 and 9.1 m). Both platforms were extended to the north and south. Six-car local trains began operating in October 1910.

=== BRT and Dual Contracts ===
After the original IRT opened, the city began planning new lines. A proposed Tri-borough system was adopted in early 1908, combining the Broadway–Lexington Avenue and Nassau Street lines; a Canal Street subway from the Fourth Avenue Subway in Brooklyn via the Manhattan Bridge to the Hudson River; and several other lines in Brooklyn. The lines were assigned to the Brooklyn Rapid Transit Company (BRT; after 1923, the Brooklyn–Manhattan Transit Corporation or BMT) in the Dual Contracts, adopted on March 4, 1913. The BRT was authorized to construct a line under Broadway with a station at Canal Street, as well as a line under Canal Street with a station at Broadway. The development of the BRT stations resulted in increased real-estate values in the area.

Also as part of the Dual Contracts, the Lexington Avenue Line opened north of Grand Central–42nd Street in 1918, and the original line was divided into an H-shaped system. All local trains were sent via the Lexington Avenue Line, running along the Pelham Line in the Bronx.

==== Centre Street Loop ====
As early as 1902, Parsons had devised plans for a subway line under Centre Street in Lower Manhattan. The line would have had four tracks from the Brooklyn Bridge north to Canal Street; from there, two tracks would split eastward to the Manhattan Bridge, and two tracks would continue north and east to the Williamsburg Bridge. By 1904, the route had been widened to four tracks from the Brooklyn Bridge to the Williamsburg Bridge. The Centre Street Loop (later the Nassau Street Line) was approved on January 25, 1907, as a four-track line. The route was to connect the Brooklyn Bridge, Manhattan Bridge, and Williamsburg Bridge via Centre Street, Canal Street, and Delancey Street, with a spur under Canal Street. Unlike previous subway contracts that the city government had issued, the BRT was responsible only for constructing the Centre Street Loop and installing equipment, not for operating the loop.

The work was split into five sections; the Canal Street station was built as part of the two sections of the line that ran under Centre Street. The city began receiving bids for these sections in March 1907. The Degnon Construction Company was hired to build section 9-0-2, from Canal Street north to Broome Street, while the Cranford Company was hired to build section 9-0-3, from Canal Street south to Pearl Street. The line had to be built through the former site of Collect Pond, which still had high amounts of groundwater. Contractors drained the groundwater, causing a huge crack in a nearby courthouse building.

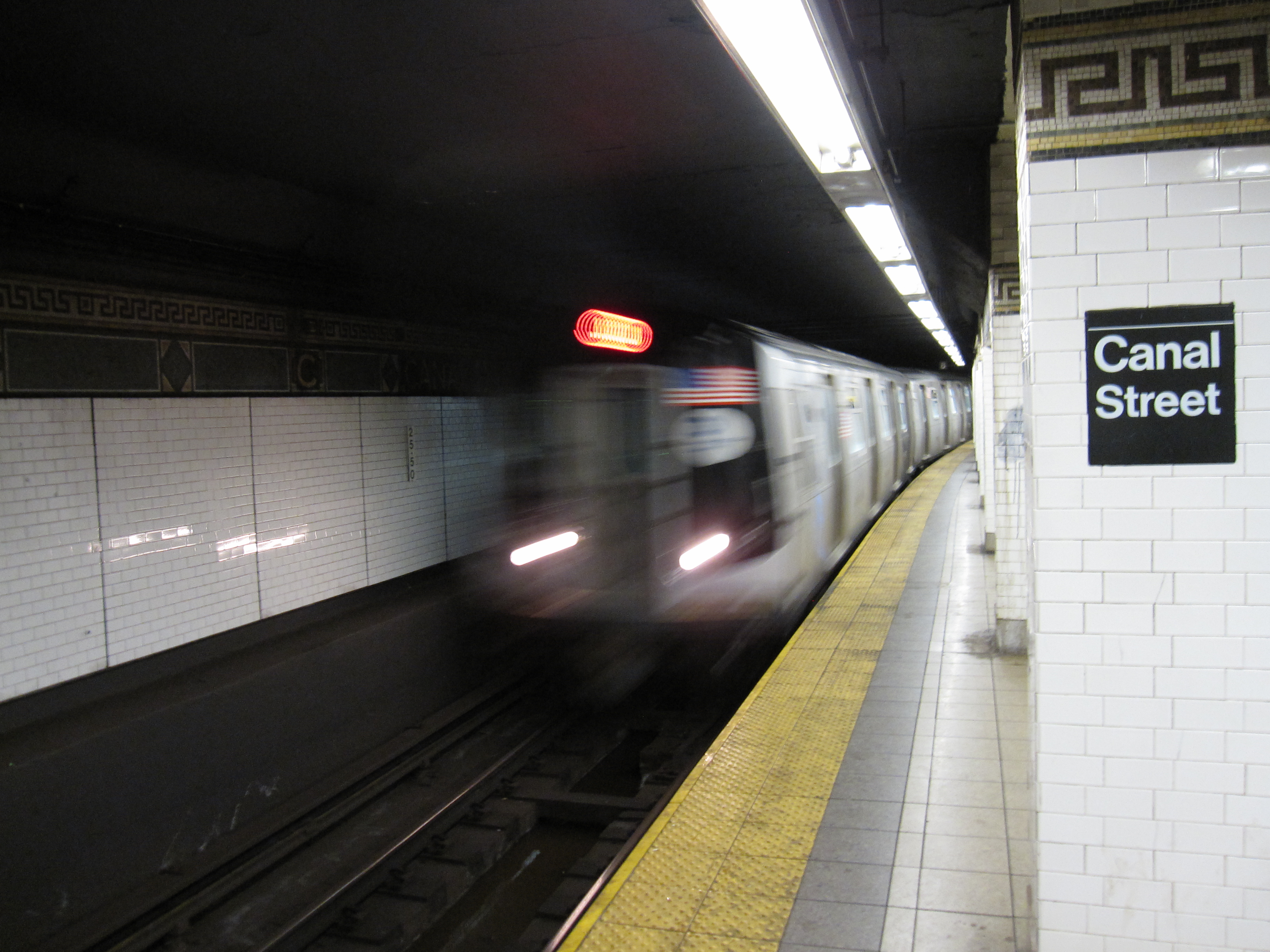
The Centre Street Loop station was completed at the end of 1909 but did not open until 1913.

The Centre Street Loop station, including a bridge over a planned line on Canal Street, was completed at the end of 1909. The station remained closed because the Chambers Street station, the terminal for the Centre Street Loop, was not complete. The BRT tunnel under Centre Street was completed by 1910, except for the section under the Manhattan Municipal Building, which contained the incomplete Chambers Street station. The tunnel remained unused for several years. In March 1913, the Public Service Commission authorized the BRT to lay tracks, install signals, and operate the loop. The Nassau Street Line platforms opened on August 4, 1913, providing service to northern Brooklyn via the Williamsburg Bridge.

==== Manhattan Bridge line ====
The IRT unsuccessfully proposed constructing a two-track subway line along Canal Street in 1908, which would have crossed the Manhattan Bridge and connected with what is now the Eastern Parkway Line in Brooklyn. The BRT proposed the next year to construct a line across Canal Street and the Manhattan Bridge to connect with the Brighton Beach Line. The BRT submitted a proposal to the Commission, dated March 2, 1911, to operate the Tri-borough system (but under Church Street instead of Greenwich Street), as well as a branch along Broadway, Seventh Avenue, and 59th Street from Ninth Street north and east to the Queensboro Bridge. The Canal Street subway was to merge with the Broadway Line instead of continuing to the Hudson River. The Canal Street tunnel was originally supposed to be a separate line passing under the Broadway Line station and extend further westward. At the time, the Public Service Commission did not plan to build a track connection between the Canal Street and Broadway lines, saying that such a connection would cause severe train congestion. The BRT wanted to connect the lines, citing the fact that it would be difficult for passengers to transfer at the Canal Street station or to reroute trains in case of emergency.

By the time the Dual Contracts were signed, the plans had been modified so the Manhattan Bridge line connected to the Broadway Line; this connection was estimated to cost an additional $1 million. In October 1913, the Public Service Commission ordered the BRT's parent company, the New York Municipal Corporation, to pay the Underpinning and Foundation Company about $12,000 for work related to the construction of the connection between the Canal Street and Broadway lines. At the time, the Underpinning and Foundation Company was constructing the section of the Broadway Line from Howard Street north to Bleecker Street; the New York Municipal Corporation ultimately had to pay the contractor an additional $412,000 for the connection. The commission was soliciting bids for a tunnel that diverged from the Broadway mainline, extending east under Canal Street to the Manhattan Bridge, by February 1914. Due to the swampy character of the area, caused by the presence of the former Collect Pond, the commission considered building the line using either the cut-and-cover method or using deep-bore tunneling. The Underpinning and Foundation Company submitted a low bid of $1.822 million for a cut-and-cover tunnel in May 1914, and the company was selected to build the station two months later.

Work on the Manhattan Bridge line proceeded slowly, in part because of the high water table of the area, which required the contractor to pump out millions of gallons of groundwater every day. Although the old canal along Canal Street had been infilled, the ground still contained significant amounts of water; the Manhattan Bridge line was to be built within the bottom of the old Collect Pond, about 35 feet (11 m) below the water level of the former pond. The Sun wrote that "the solution of the problem is in a way as great as those" that the builders of the Panama Canal had faced. About 6,000 to 7,000 U.S. gallons (23,000 to 26,000 L) of water had to be pumped out every minute of the day at all times, equating to about 10 million U.S. gallons (38,000,000 L; 8,300,000 imp gal) every twenty-four hours. Workers then excavated sand and gravel from the site. In addition, the IRT station settled about 2.5 inches (64 mm) when the Manhattan Bridge line station was excavated. Only a third of the project had been finished by mid-1915. The Manhattan Bridge line was less than half completed by January 1916, and it was 80 percent finished by that October. The Manhattan Bridge line platforms opened on September 4, 1917, as part of the first section of the Broadway Line from Canal Street to 14th Street–Union Square.

==== Broadway mainline ====
The New York Public Service Commission also adopted plans for what was known as the Broadway–Lexington Avenue route (later the Broadway mainline) on December 31, 1907. A list of stations on the Broadway–Lexington Avenue line were announced in 1909; the plans tentatively called for an express station at Canal Street in Lower Manhattan. Two segments of the Broadway Line around Canal Street were placed under contract early in 1912. The contract for Section 2, between Murray Street and Canal Street, was awarded to the Degnon Contracting Company that January. Two months later, the contract for Section 2A, which stretched between Canal and Howard Streets and included the Canal Street station, was awarded to the O'Rourke Engineering Construction Company. Section 2A was twelve percent completed by early 1913. Work on section 2 was further advanced, being 60 percent done by June of that year.

The design of the Broadway mainline's station was changed midway through construction when the track connection to the Manhattan Bridge line was added. In the original plan for the station, the mainline's center tracks were to have continued up Broadway, fed by traffic from Brooklyn and the Montague Street Tunnel. Local service was to have terminated at the upper level of the Broadway Line's City Hall station, with express service using City Hall's upper level. The new plan favored local service via City Hall's upper level and express service via the Manhattan Bridge; the center tracks of the mainline station were abandoned, as they would feed into the unused lower-level platforms at City Hall.

The Broadway Line south of 14th Street was substantially complete by February 1916. The same month, the Public Service Commission began accepting bids for the installation of finishes at seven stations on the Broadway Line from Rector Street to 14th Street, including Canal Street. D. C. Gerber submitted a $346,000 low bid for the finishes and was 35 percent completed with the finishes by October 1916. The mainline platforms opened on January 5, 1918, when the Broadway Line was extended north to Times Square–42nd Street and south to Rector Street. From the outset, the mainline station served local trains, while the Manhattan Bridge line station began serving express trains.

=== 1910s to 1930s ===
==== Leaks and platform extensions ====
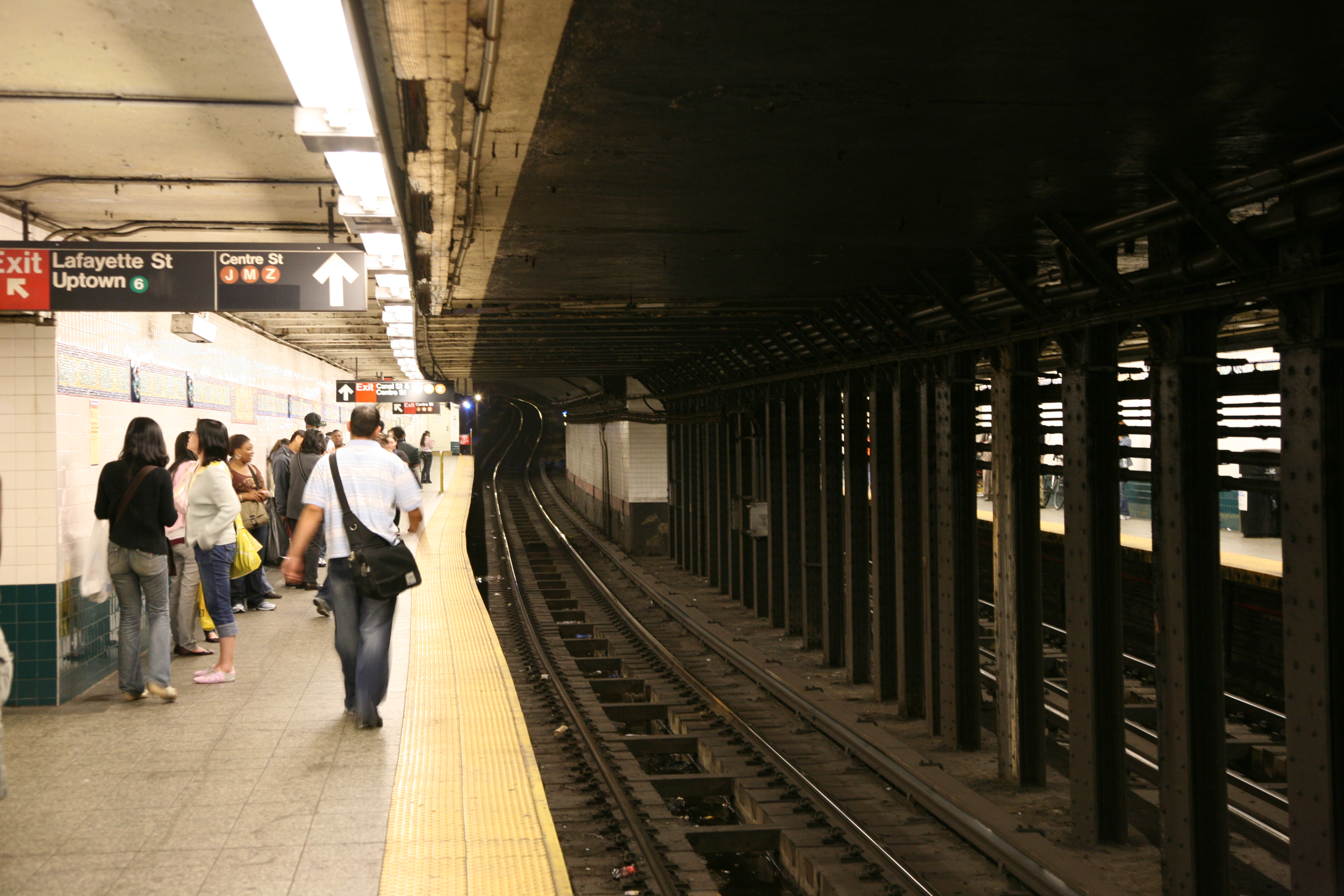
The Manhattan Bridge line station had to be modified between 1918 and 1919 after developing leaks.

The Manhattan Bridge line station had begun to leak noticeably by April 1918, in large part because of the high amount of groundwater in the area. Although the station had been built with a waterproof asphalt-and-brick membrane, there were still large amounts of groundwater in the area, and pressure from the groundwater had caused the membrane to crack. The leaks became so severe that up to 150 U.S. gallons (570 L; 120 imp gal) per minute leaked into the station. In late 1918, the Underpinning and Foundation Company was hired to grout the station for $20,000 to stop the leaks. To allow workers to repair the station, the BRT operated a shuttle service from Canal Street to Pacific Street on a single track during late nights. The work was completed by April 1919, after which the leaks almost completely stopped. As a side effect of the grouting work, the settlement of the IRT station was corrected.

In 1922, the Rapid Transit Commission awarded a contract to the Wagner Engineering Company for the installation of navigational signs at the Canal Street station and several other major subway stations. The IRT platforms received blue-and-white signs, while the BMT platforms received red-white-and-green navigational signs. That December, the commission approved a $3 million project to lengthen platforms at 14 local stations along the original IRT line, including Canal Street and seven other stations on the Lexington Avenue Line. Platform lengths at these stations would be increased from 225 to 436 feet (69 to 133 m). The commission postponed the platform-lengthening project in September 1923, at which point the cost had risen to $5.6 million. The mainline Broadway Line station's platforms originally could only fit six 67-foot-long (20 m) cars. In 1926, the New York City Board of Transportation received bids for the lengthening of platforms at nine stations on the Broadway Line, including the mainline station at Canal Street, to accommodate eight-car trains. Edwards & Flood submitted a low bid of $101,775 for the project. The BMT platform-lengthening project was completed in 1927, bringing the length of the platforms to 535 feet (163 m). The commission ordered the BMT to install additional signs at the Canal Street BMT stations in mid-1930.

Meanwhile, the commission again considered lengthening the IRT platforms at Canal Street in December 1927. The platforms would be extended southward, in the direction of the Worth Street station, where the platforms would not be lengthened. At the end of the month, the Transit Commission requested that the IRT create plans to lengthen the platforms at Canal Street and three other Lexington Avenue Line stations to 480 feet (150 m). The New York City Board of Transportation drew up plans for the project, but the federal government placed an injunction against the commission's platform-lengthening decree, which remained in place for over a year. The commission approved the plans in mid-1929; the Canal Street station's platforms were to be extended 256 feet (78 m) to the south. The IRT refused, claiming that the city government was responsible for the work, and obtained a federal injunction to prevent the commission from forcing the IRT to lengthen the platforms. In late 1930, the commission requested that the New York Supreme Court force the IRT to lengthen platforms at the Canal Street and Spring Street stations.

==== Overcrowding issues ====
After the BRT stations at Canal Street opened, the complex became a major transfer hub for the BRT lines, but the different platforms were only connected via a narrow passageway. Overcrowding was exacerbated by the fact that the station was the only place where Centre Street Line passengers could transfer to a BRT train to Midtown Manhattan; the convoluted layout of staircases and passageways; and the lack of directional signs. By 1918, local civic groups were advocating for the opening of the BRT's Canarsie Line (which had a transfer to the Broadway Line at Union Square) to alleviate congestion at Canal Street; the Public Service Commission was obligated to open that line as part of the Dual Contracts. The Broadway Board of Trade called the station "a menace to life and limb". In response, in February 1918, the Public Service Commission announced in February 1918 that it would build two exit stairways and have some Centre Street Loop trains skip the Canal Street station. The BRT also employed staff members on the platforms at all times to direct traffic.

In June 1920, the BRT began requiring passengers to exit the station if they wished to transfer between the Nassau Street and Broadway lines during rush hours. Passengers were issued transfer tickets from the Nassau Street Line to the Broadway Line in the morning and vice versa in the afternoon. To further alleviate crowding, the Transit Commission requested in mid-1922 that plans be drawn up for a new entrance at the southwest corner of Centre and Walker Streets. In addition, the Broadway Association asked that a station be built on the Broadway Line between Canal Street and City Hall due to the unusually long distance between the two stops. By 1924, BMT officials said that, if anyone were to be killed because of congestion at Canal Street, mayor John Francis Hylan would be to blame. The next year, the BMT agreed to complete the Canarsie Line to reduce overcrowding at Canal Street. Canarsie Line trains finally began running directly to Brooklyn in 1928, by which the BMT was issuing 38,000 transfers per day at Canal Street during rush hours. The addition of direct Brooklyn service on the Canarsie Line reduced overcrowding at the Canal Street station, and the passageway at Canal Street was reopened in August 1928.

=== 1940s to 1980s ===
The city government took over the BMT's operations on June 1, 1940, and the IRT's operations on June 12, 1940. The New York City Board of Transportation issued a $1.992 million contract in April 1947 to extend the southbound IRT platforms at Canal Street and Worth Street to fit ten-car trains. The work was finished the next year. In late 1959, contracts were awarded to extend the platforms at Bowling Green, Wall Street, Fulton Street, Canal Street, Spring Street, Bleecker Street, Astor Place, Grand Central–42nd Street, 86th Street, and 125th Street on the IRT Lexington Avenue Line to 525 feet (160 m). The next April, work began on a $3,509,000 project (equivalent to $38.2 million in 2025) to lengthen platforms at seven of these stations to accommodate ten-car trains. The northbound platforms at Canal Street, Spring Street, Bleecker Street, and Astor Place were lengthened from 225 to 525 feet (69 to 160 m); the platform extensions at these stations opened on February 19, 1962.

In the late 1960s, New York City Transit extended both sets of Broadway Line platforms to accommodate ten-car trains. The NYCTA also covered the elaborate mosaic tile walls with 8-by-16-inch (20 by 41 cm) white cinderblock tiles at 16 local stations on the Broadway and Fourth Avenue lines, including both the Broadway mainline and Manhattan Bridge line platforms at Canal Street.

The station agents' booths at Canal Street and Centre Street, and at Canal Street and Broadway, were closed in 1976 to save money. These booths were reopened part-time in 1978. On January 16, 1978, the transfer between the Lexington Avenue Line and the BMT platforms was placed inside fare control. The free transfer was intended to encourage increased ridership. Previously, the BMT stations were all connected with each other, but people transferring between the BMT and IRT had to pay a second fare.

=== 1990s to present ===
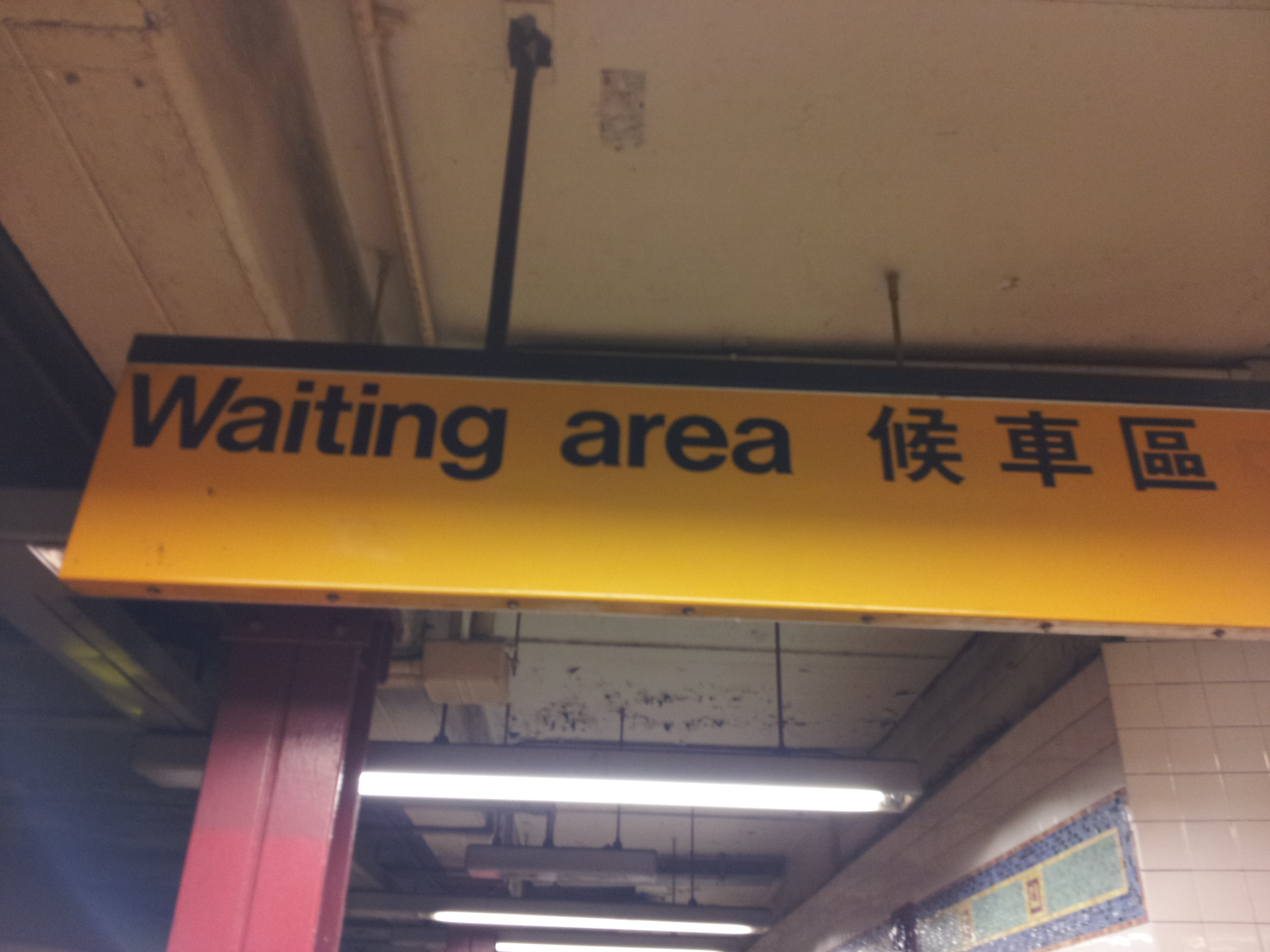
Bilingual signage

With the exception of three months in 1990, train service to the Manhattan Bridge line's platforms was suspended from 1988 to 2001 while the Manhattan Bridge's southern pair of subway tracks was rebuilt. The platforms remained open for passengers transferring between the other routes, since they were the only connections between the other platforms in the complex. Service between Manhattan and Brooklyn was redirected to the mainline platforms and used the Montague Street Tunnel. The three-month period was supposed to have allowed train service while work on the bridge was not being done, but on December 27, 1990, the discovery of missing steel plates and corrosion that threatened the bridge's integrity halted this service. During the 1990s, garbage accumulated on the unused spur tracks, and the ceiling and tiles developed water damage. In 1997, a temporary art exhibit known as the Canal Street Canal by Alexander Brodsky was installed on the northbound track, after Brodsky won an MTA Arts for Transit design competition. It consisted of a large waterproof tub filled with water, with Venetian canal boats floating inside.

In April 1993, the New York State Legislature agreed to give the MTA $9.6 billion for capital improvements. Some of the funds would be used to renovate nearly one hundred New York City Subway stations, including the entire Canal Street complex. Work on the renovation began in May 1994, at which point it was supposed to cost $44 million. To minimize disruption to the surrounding neighborhood, workers only conducted excavations at night. The work included modifications to staircases, re-tiling for the walls, new tiling on the floors, upgrading the station's lights and the public address system, installing new lighting, and installing two elevators. The elevators made the Lexington Avenue Line platforms compliant with the Americans with Disabilities Act of 1990 (ADA).

The project was originally supposed to be complete in December 1997. The MTA hosted tours of the station during the renovation, selling tickets to members of the public who wished to see the work in detail. During the renovation, in October 1995, workers accidentally drilled into the foundation of a neighboring building named Fu Long Plaza, causing that building to tilt. Water main breaks also delayed the project. By mid-1999, the completion of the station's renovation had been postponed nearly three years, to November 2000. In advance of the reopening of the Manhattan Bridge's southern tracks, the Manhattan Bridge line platforms were also renovated with new lighting, tiles, and third rails. The Manhattan Bridge line platforms reopened on July 22, 2001.

In 2026, Morris Adjmi Architects presented designs by a 21-story building at 277 Canal Street (at the northeast corner with Broadway). In exchange for a zoning bonus allowing the building to include additional space, the developer, United American Land, proposed enlarging the existing subway entrance at that corner and adding elevators to the Broadway Line platforms.

== Station layout ==
The complex consists of four originally separate stations joined by underground passageways. Three of the four run in a north–south direction, crossing at Broadway (Broadway mainline), Lafayette Street (Lexington Avenue Line), and Centre Street (Nassau Street Line). The Manhattan Bridge line platforms are directly underneath Canal Street itself, extending west–east. The Bridge line platforms serve as transfer passageways between all other lines.

The station serves multiple neighborhoods, including Chinatown, Little Italy, SoHo, and Tribeca. Some relative depths of the stations in the Canal Street complex are as follows:

- IRT Lexington Avenue Line, 20 feet (6.1 m) below street
- BMT Broadway Line, mainline, 20 feet (6.1 m)
- BMT Nassau Street Line, 40 feet (12 m)
- BMT Broadway Line, Manhattan Bridge branch, 55 feet (17 m)

=== Exits ===
The complex has a total of 13 staircase entrances and two separate elevator entrances for the Lexington Avenue Line's platforms. From the Broadway mainline platforms, there are two staircases to each of the northwestern, southeastern, and southwestern corners. There is also a staircase to the northeastern corner of Broadway and Canal Street. There is a staircase from the Nassau Street Line to the southwestern corner of Centre Street and Canal Street. The Manhattan Bridge branch platforms' exits are also used by the Lexington Avenue Line platforms. Three staircases from the northbound Lexington Avenue Line platform lead to the eastern corners of Lafayette Street and Canal Street, with one to the northeast corner and two to the southeast corner. From the southbound Lexington Avenue Line platform there are staircases to the western corners of Lafayette Street and Canal Street.

Two elevators at the intersection of Canal and Lafayette Streets make the Lexington Avenue Line station accessible as part of the Americans with Disabilities Act of 1990 (ADA). The northbound platform's elevator is at the northeastern corner, while the southbound platform's elevator is at the northwestern corner. None of the other platforms in the complex are ADA-accessible, but accessibility to those platforms has been proposed under the MTA's 2025–2029 Capital Program.

There are a number of closed exits in the Canal Street complex. One such exit led to a building at the northeastern corner of Canal Street and Centre Street; during the 1996 renovation, this became an emergency exit. Two stairs at the southeastern corner of the same intersection (serving only the northbound platform) are shown in a 1995 neighborhood map, but they had been removed by 1999. At the intersection of Canal and Lafayette Streets, there were additional staircases at the northeastern corner, the northwestern corner, and the southwestern corner.

== IRT Lexington Avenue Line platforms ==
Canal Street
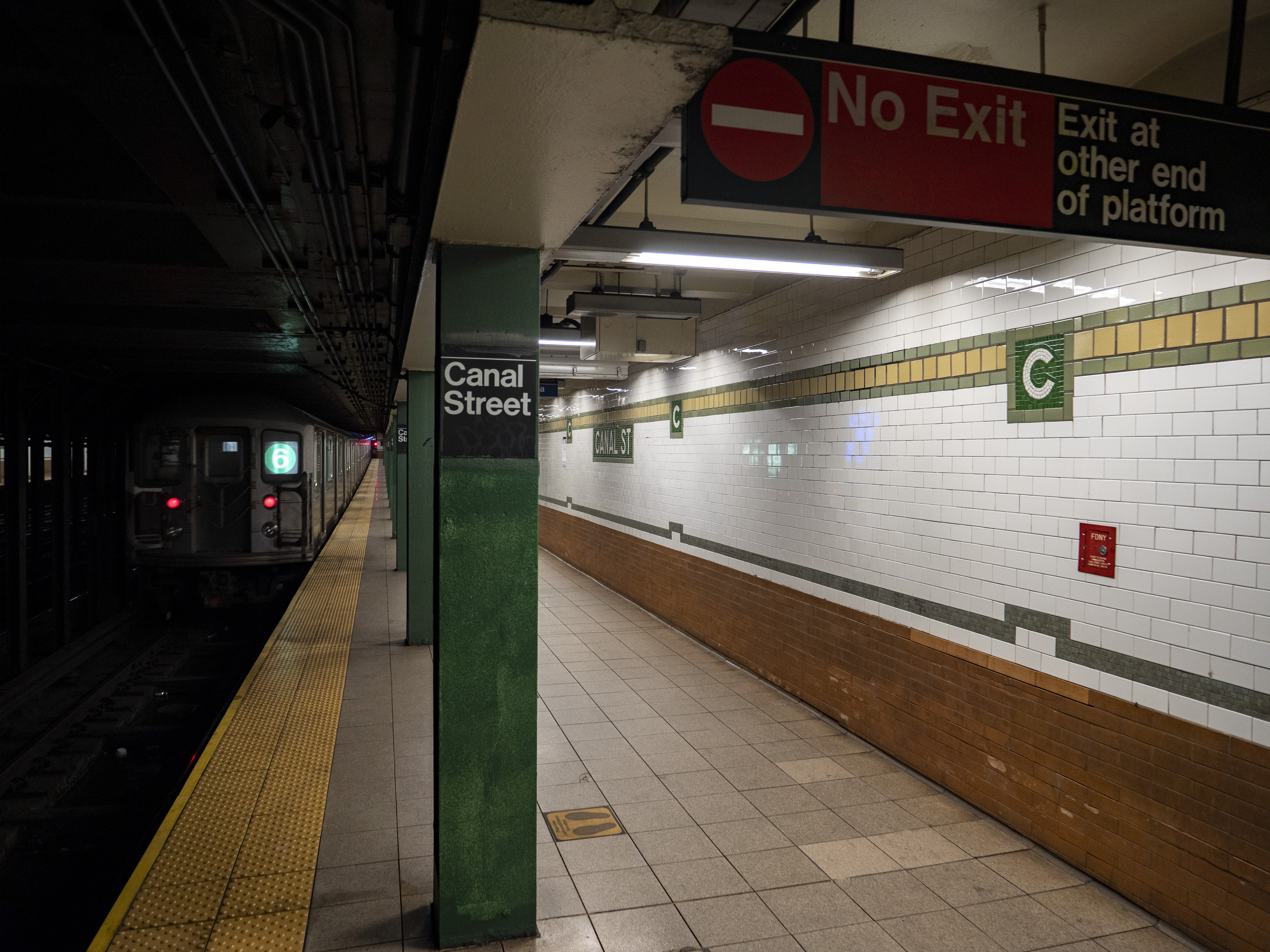
- R62A 6 train departing from the northbound platform

Station statistics
- Division: A (IRT)
- Line: IRT Lexington Avenue Line
- Services: 4 (late nights); 6 (all times) <6> (weekdays until 8:45 p.m., peak direction)
- Structure: Underground
- Platforms: 2 side platforms
- Tracks: 4

Other information
- Opened: October 27, 1904; 122 years ago
- Accessible: Yes (transfers to other routes are not accessible; there is also no accessible transfer between northbound and southbound platforms)
Services
Preceding station	New York City Subway	Following station
Spring Street 4 6 <6> toward Pelham Bay Park	Local	Brooklyn Bridge–City Hall 4 6 <6> Terminus
does not stop here
Non-revenue services and lines
Preceding station	New York City Subway	Following station
	no service	Worth Street closed
Track layout
Station service legend
Symbol	Description
Stops all times	Stops all times
Stops late nights only	Stops late nights only
Stops rush hours in the peak direction only	Stops rush hours in the peak direction only

The Canal Street station on the IRT Lexington Avenue Line is a local station that has four tracks and two side platforms. The 6 stops here at all times, rush-hour and midday <6> trains stop here in the peak direction; and the 4 stops here during late nights. The two express tracks are used by the 4 and 5 trains during daytime hours. The station is between Spring Street to the north and Brooklyn Bridge–City Hall to the south. When the subway opened, the next local stop to the south was Worth Street; that station closed in 1962. The platforms were originally 200 feet (61 m) long, like at other local stations on the original IRT, but, as a result of the 1959 platform extensions, became 525 feet (160 m) long. The platform extensions are at the north ends of the original platforms.

As with other stations built as part of the original IRT, the station was constructed using a cut-and-cover method. The tunnel is covered by a U-shaped trough that contains utility pipes and wires. This trough contains a foundation of concrete no less than 4 inches (100 mm) thick. Each platform consists of 3-inch-thick (7.6 cm) concrete slabs, beneath which are drainage basins. The platforms contain columns with white glazed tiles, spaced every 15 feet (4.6 m). Additional columns between the tracks, spaced every 5 feet (1.5 m), support the jack-arched concrete station roofs. There is a 1-inch (25 mm) gap between the trough wall and the platform walls, which are made of 4-inch (100 mm)-thick brick covered over by a tiled finish. During the late 1910s, contractors waterproofed the station, placing a 5 in-thick (13 cm) layer of brick and a 6 in-thick (15 cm) layer of concrete under the trackbeds. Retaining walls of brick and asphalt concrete were built on either side of the Bridge Line platforms, underneath the Lexington Avenue Line station, and new roof girders were built to carry the Lexington Avenue Line above the Bridge Line.

The original decorative scheme consisted of blue/green tile station-name tablets, green tile bands, a buff terracotta cornice, and green terracotta plaques. The mosaic tiles at all original IRT stations were manufactured by the American Encaustic Tile Company, which subcontracted the installations at each station. The terracotta plaques depict a small house next to a bridge above a creek. The decorative work was performed by tile contractor Manhattan Glass Tile Company and terracotta contractor Atlantic Terra Cotta Company. The ceilings of the original platforms and fare control areas contain plaster molding. The newer portion has 1950s green tile at the end of the platforms. There are also Independent Subway System (IND)-type "To Canal Street" signs. New lights were installed. Non-original name tables and small "C" mosaics exist.

There are two fare control areas adjacent to each of the platforms. From each fare control area, exit stairways ascend to the corners of Lafayette and Canal streets; the northern fare-control area also lead to a single elevator that ascends to street level. The southbound platform's exits are on the western corners of that intersection, while the northbound platform's exits are on the eastern corners. In addition, a passageway leads from each of the two platforms (between the two fare-control areas), where they descend to a cross-passage above the BMT Bridge Line platforms. From each cross-passage, a stair leads down to either BMT Bridge Line platform.

=== Image gallery ===
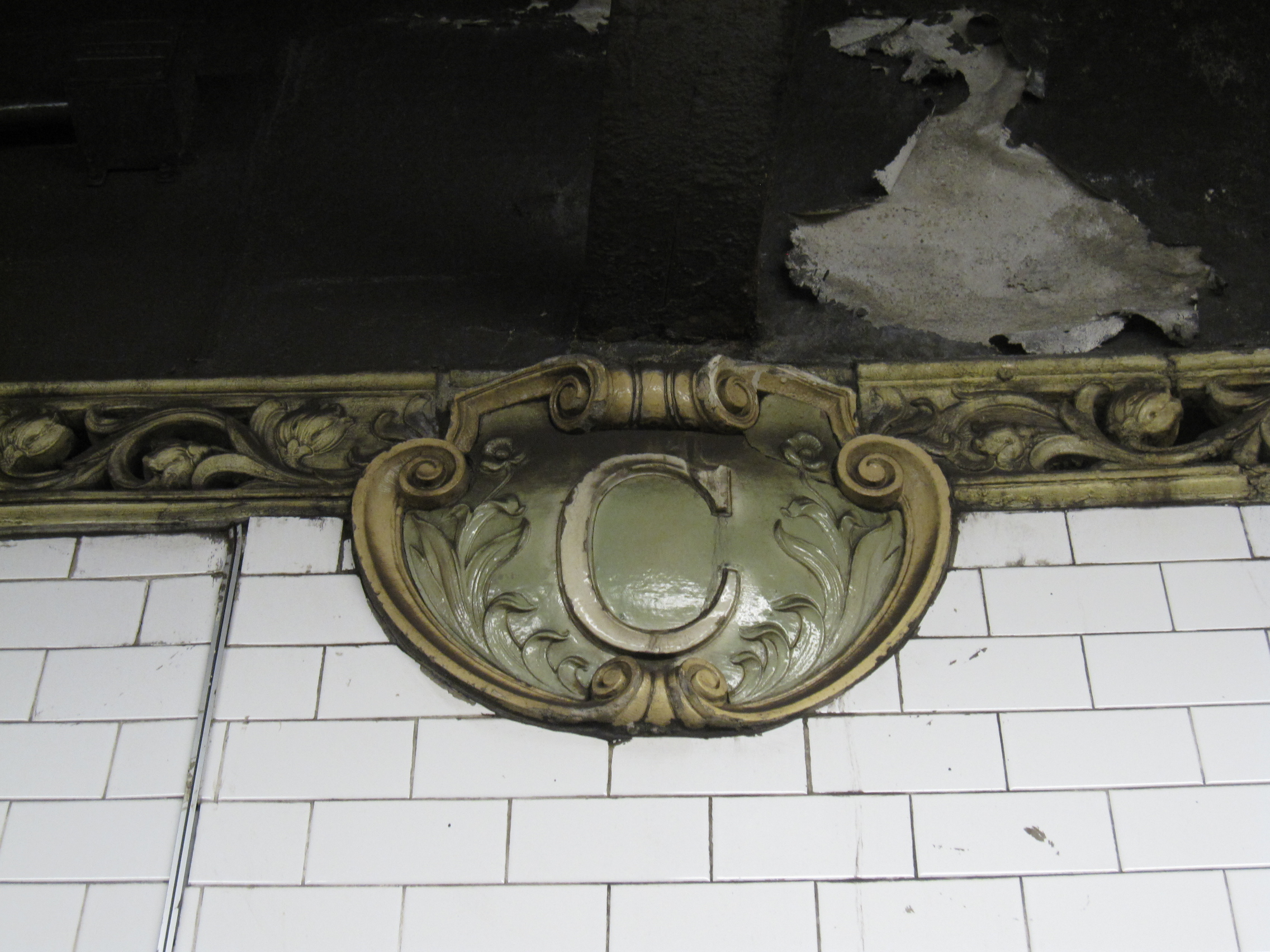
Terra-cotta plaque by Heins & LaFarge / Atlantic Terra Cotta Company, 1904

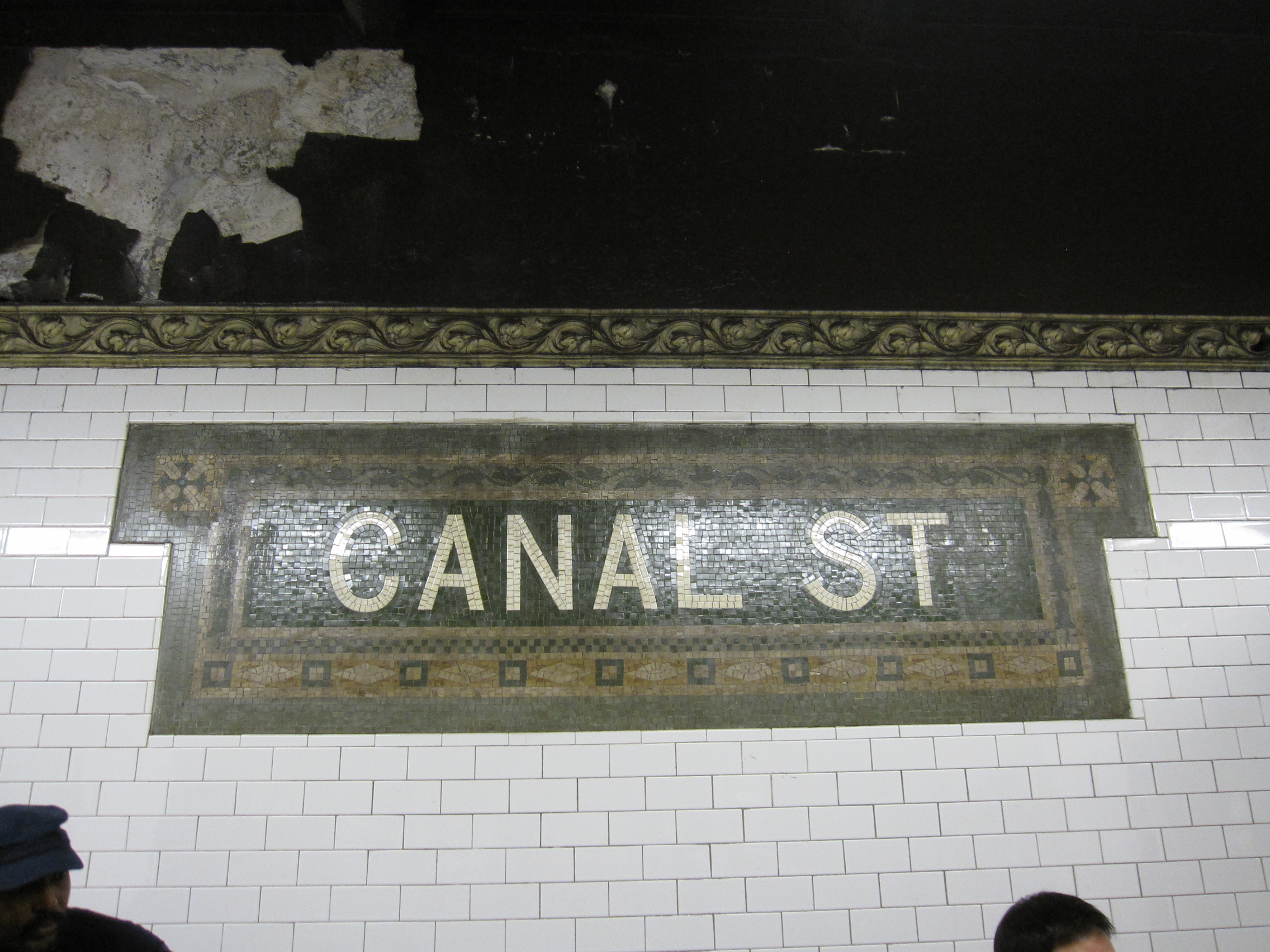
Name tablet by Heins & LaFarge / Manhattan Glass Tile Company, 1904

== BMT Nassau Street Line platforms ==
Canal Street
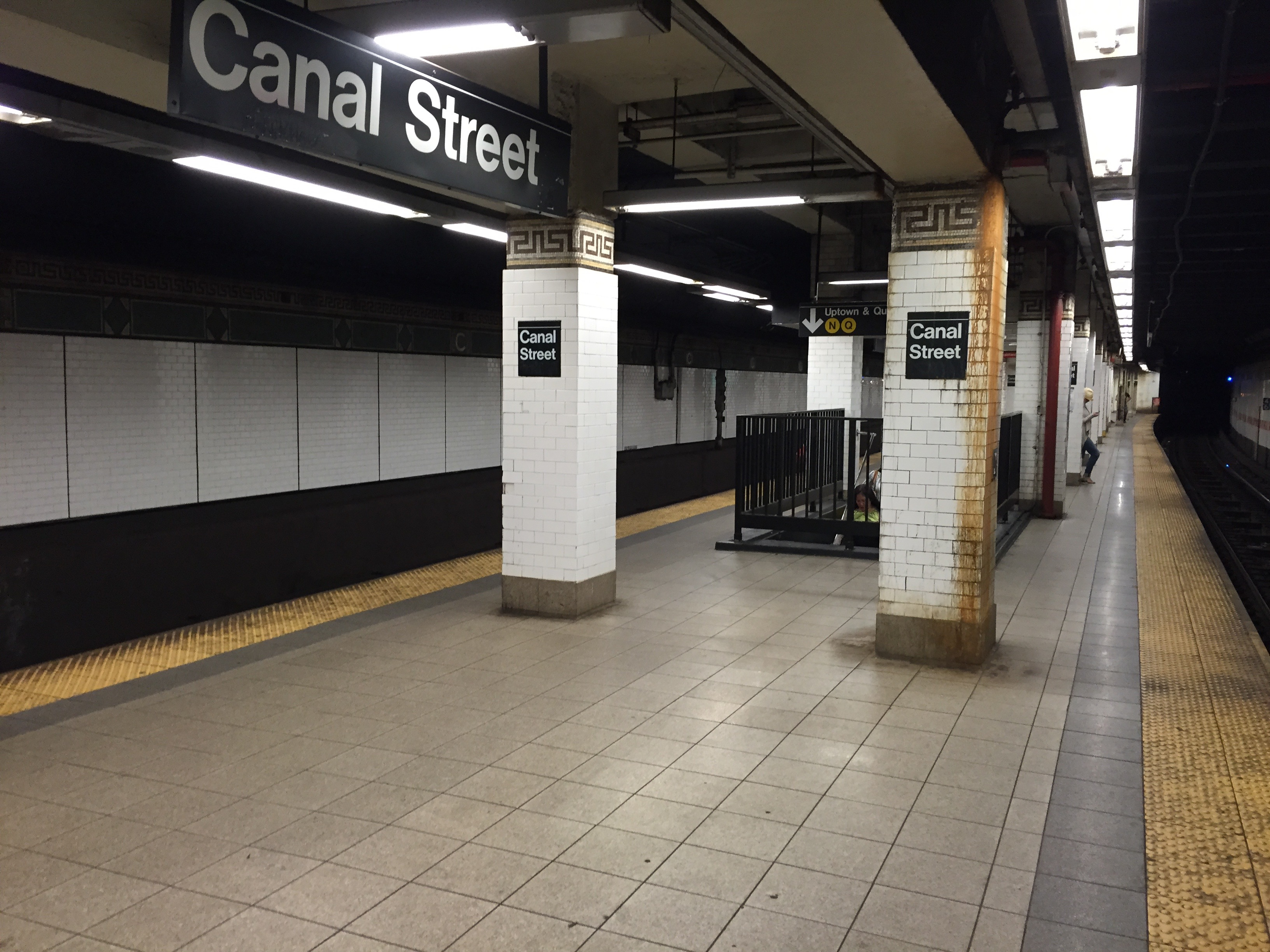
- Canal Street after renovation

Station statistics
- Division: B (BMT)
- Line: BMT Nassau Street Line
- Services: J (all times); Z (rush hours, peak direction)
- Structure: Underground
- Platforms: 2 island platforms (1 in regular service)
- Tracks: 3 (2 in regular service)

Other information
- Opened: August 4, 1913; 113 years ago
- Rebuilt: 2004
- Accessible: Partially; access to mezzanine only, access to platforms planned
Services
Preceding station	New York City Subway	Following station
Bowery J Z toward Jamaica Center–York College	J/Z (New York City Subway service)	Chambers Street J Z toward Broad Street
Track layout
Station service legend
Symbol	Description
Stops all times	Stops all times
Stops rush hours in the peak direction only	Stops rush hours in the peak direction only
Stops weekday evenings only	Stops weekday evenings only

The Canal Street station on the BMT Nassau Street Line has three tracks and two island platforms, but only the western island platform is accessible to passengers. The J stops here at all times and the Z stops here during rush hours in the peak direction. The station is between Bowery to the north and Chambers Street to the south. Fixed platform barriers, which are intended to prevent commuters falling to the tracks, are positioned near the platform edges.

During the late 1910s, contractors waterproofed the station, placing a layer of brick and a 6 in-thick (15 cm) layer of concrete under the trackbeds. Lead plates were installed under the trackbeds where they crossed over the Bridge Line platforms.

Formerly, Canal Street resembled a typical express station, except that the inner tracks dead-ended at bumper blocks at the south end with a platform-level connection joining the southern ends of the two platforms. After a reconfiguration of the Nassau Street Line in 2004, the eastern (former "northbound") platforms were abandoned and the platform-level connection was removed, allowing the former southbound express track to continue south. The westernmost (former "southbound") platform remains in operation and both tracks provide through service; southbound traffic using the former southbound "local" track and northbound traffic using the former southbound "express" track. The former northbound local track is now used only for non-revenue moves, train storage and emergencies while the northbound express stub track was removed. The former northbound "local" track merges with the former southbound "express" track (now the northbound track) south of the station. One stair descends from the western island platform to each of the Bridge Line's side platforms. Another stair ascends from the island platform to a mezzanine, which in turn leads to a station exit on Centre Street.

Within the tunnels north and south of the station, each of the BMT Nassau Street Line's four tracks is separated by a concrete wall, rather than by columns, as in older IRT tunnels. These walls were intended to improve ventilation, as air would be pushed forward by passing trains, rather than to the sides of the tunnel. The wall between the two inner tracks had a thick concrete wall, with openings at infrequent intervals, where train crews could step aside when a train approached. To the north and south of the stations, the wall between the two western tracks, as well as the wall between the two eastern tracks, have openings at frequent intervals. There was an opening in the center wall about 50 feet (15 m) from the end of the station that had a narrow platform, which was used by train crews to cross between trains on the center tracks. In 2004, this opening was sealed with new tiling as the eastern platform was in the process of being closed.

South of this station there are unused stub tracks that lead from Chambers Street and used to connect to the southern tracks of the Manhattan Bridge. These tracks were disconnected with the opening of the Chrystie Street Connection in 1967 and now end at bumper blocks.

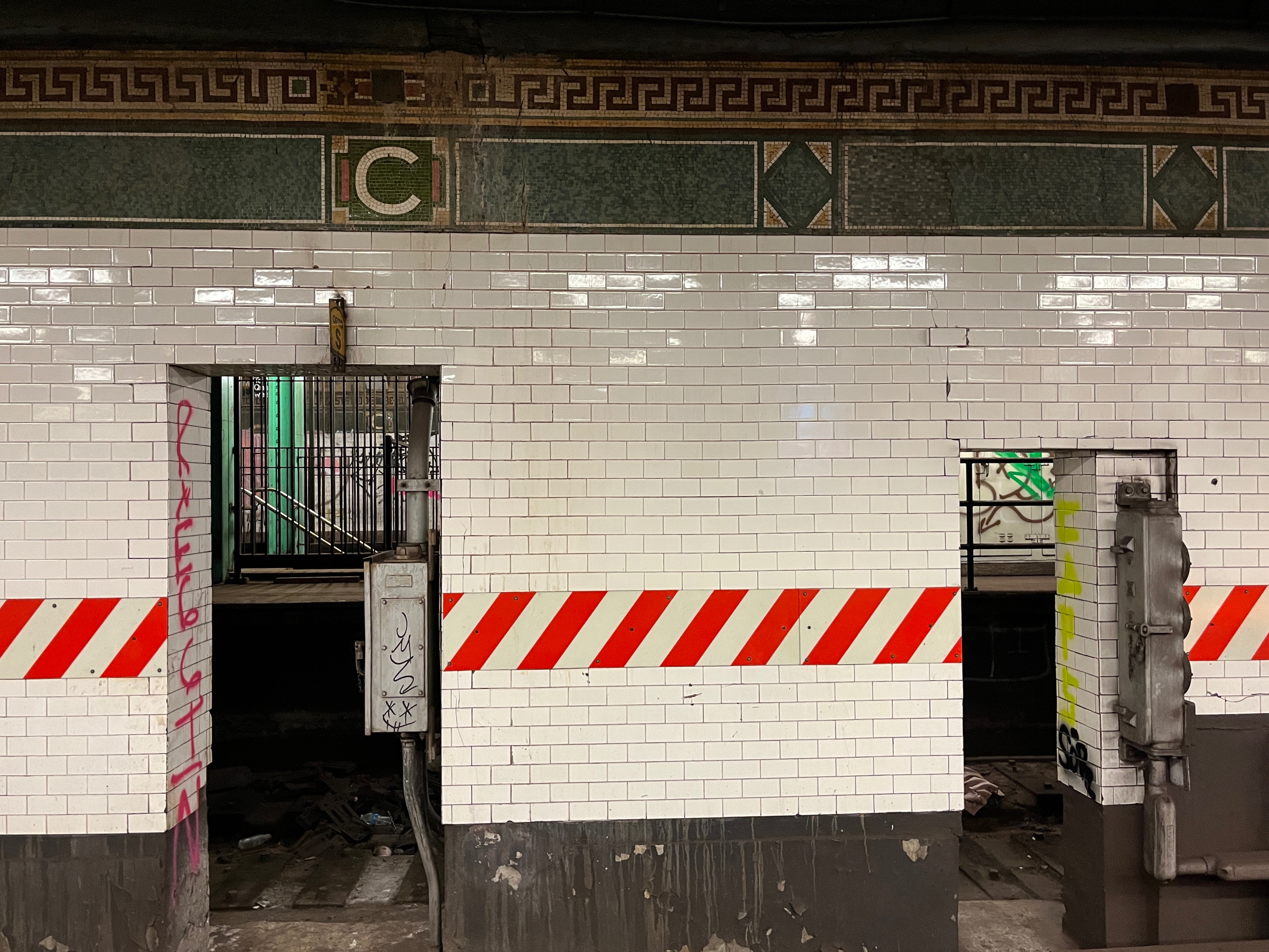
Abandoned platform, as seen through the dividing wall.

== BMT Broadway Line platforms ==
The four platforms of the Canal Street station are located on two levels and are depicted as the same station on the New York City Subway map, but have two distinct station codes and were built as separate stations. Both are part of the BMT Broadway Line. Local trains traveling to Lower Manhattan and to Brooklyn via the Montague Street Tunnel stop at the mainline platforms, while express trains traveling to and from Brooklyn via the Manhattan Bridge stop at the Bridge Line platforms.

The original mosaics at the Broadway Line stations depicted the canal that had run through the area, as seen in a 1796 sketch. The mosaics appeared to also depict the house of U.S. vice president Aaron Burr, who lived near the canal along what is now Broadway. The platforms feature mosaics containing Chinese characters, reflecting the station's location in Chinatown. The symbols on the red wall plaques mean "money" and "luck" and the "Canal Street" name tablet has characters that read "China" and "Town". The platform walls also feature the names "Canal Street" and "Chinatown" in Chinese (Chinese: 堅尼街華埠; pinyin: Jiān ní jiē huá bù).

The station has an art installation entitled Empress Voyage February 22, 1794 by Bing Lee, installed in 1998 as part of the MTA Arts & Design program. The art installation contains motifs inspired by Chinese characters. The platforms are decorated with teapots resembling the Chinese characters for "good life", while the mezzanine has symbols that variously resemble the characters for "Asia", "cycle", or "quality". Lee's art covers some of the station's original mosaics.

=== Mainline platforms (upper level) ===
Canal Street
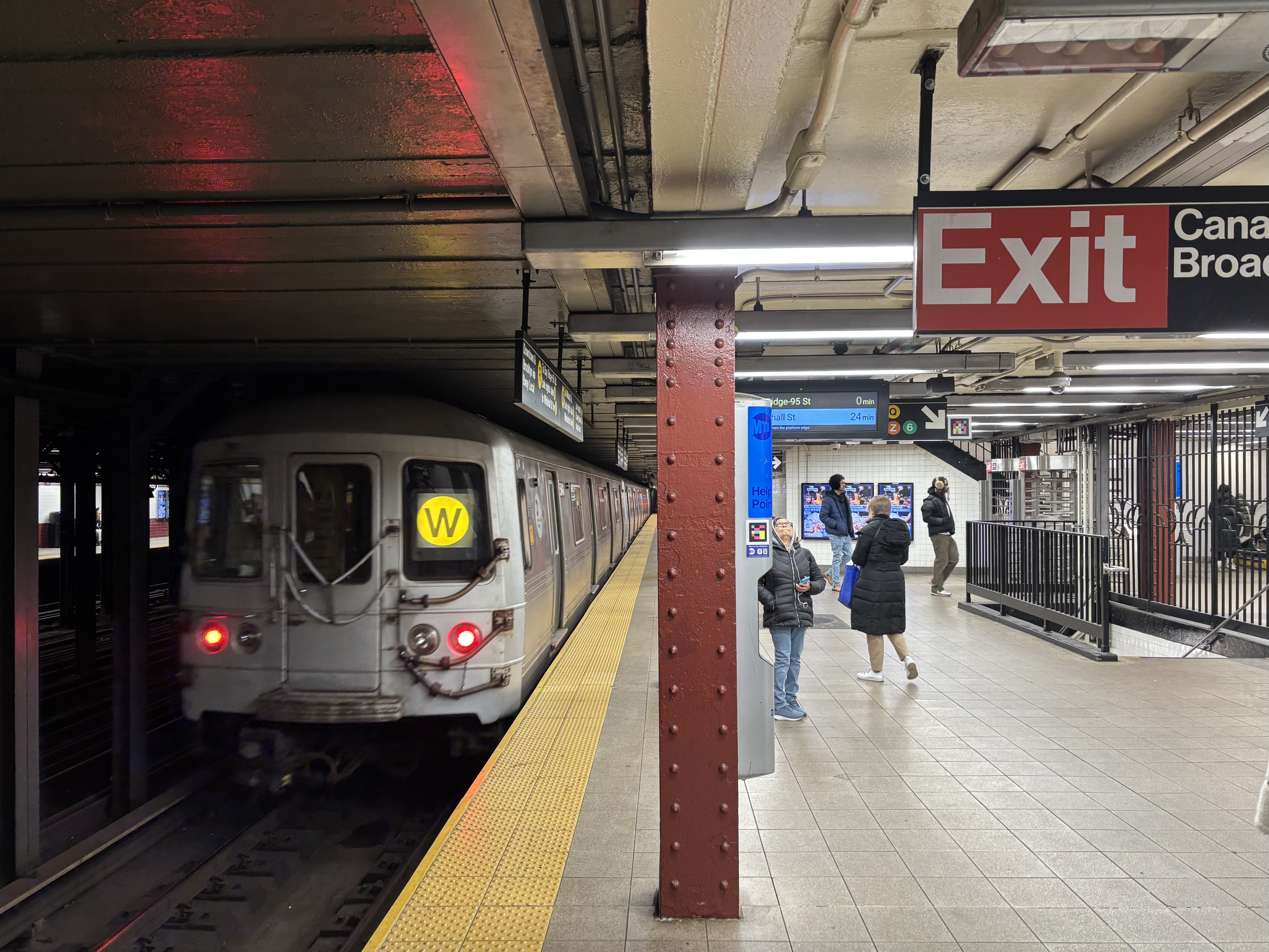
- R46 W train departing the southbound platform

Station statistics
- Division: B (BMT)
- Line: BMT Broadway Line
- Services: N (late nights); R (all except late nights); W (weekdays only)
- Structure: Underground
- Platforms: 2 side platforms
- Tracks: 4 (2 of them not for passenger service)

Other information
- Opened: January 5, 1918; 108 years ago (Broadway Line)
- Accessible: Partially; access to mezzanine only, access to platforms planned
- Former/other names: Broadway
Services
Preceding station	New York City Subway	Following station
Prince Street N R W via Lexington Avenue–59th Street	R (New York City Subway service) W (New York City Subway service)	City Hall N R W via Whitehall Street–South Ferry
Track layout
Upper level
Station service legend
Symbol	Description
Stops all times except late nights	Stops all times except late nights
Stops late nights only	Stops late nights only
Stops weekdays during the day	Stops weekdays during the day

The Canal Street station on the mainline has four tracks and two side platforms. The outer local tracks, the only ones to stop at this station, provide through service via the Montague Street Tunnel. The R stops here at all times except late nights, when it is replaced by the N. The W stops here during weekdays. The station is between Prince Street to the north and City Hall to the south.

The center tracks, which have never seen revenue service, begin at the unused lower level of City Hall and run north to here, dead-ending at bumper blocks about two-thirds of the way through. The center tracks can be used for layups, but this use has been completely made redundant with the nearby City Hall lower level being used as a layup yard instead. There is a fare control area adjacent to each of the platforms, which in turn contains exit stairways that ascend to the corners of Broadway and Canal Street. The southbound platform's exits are on the western corners of that intersection, while the northbound platform's exits are on the eastern corners. In addition, a stair from each platform descends to an underpass, which leads to a crossover at the western end of the Bridge Line platforms. The northbound fare-control area also has a ramp leading to this passageway.

=== Bridge Line platforms (lower level) ===
Canal Street
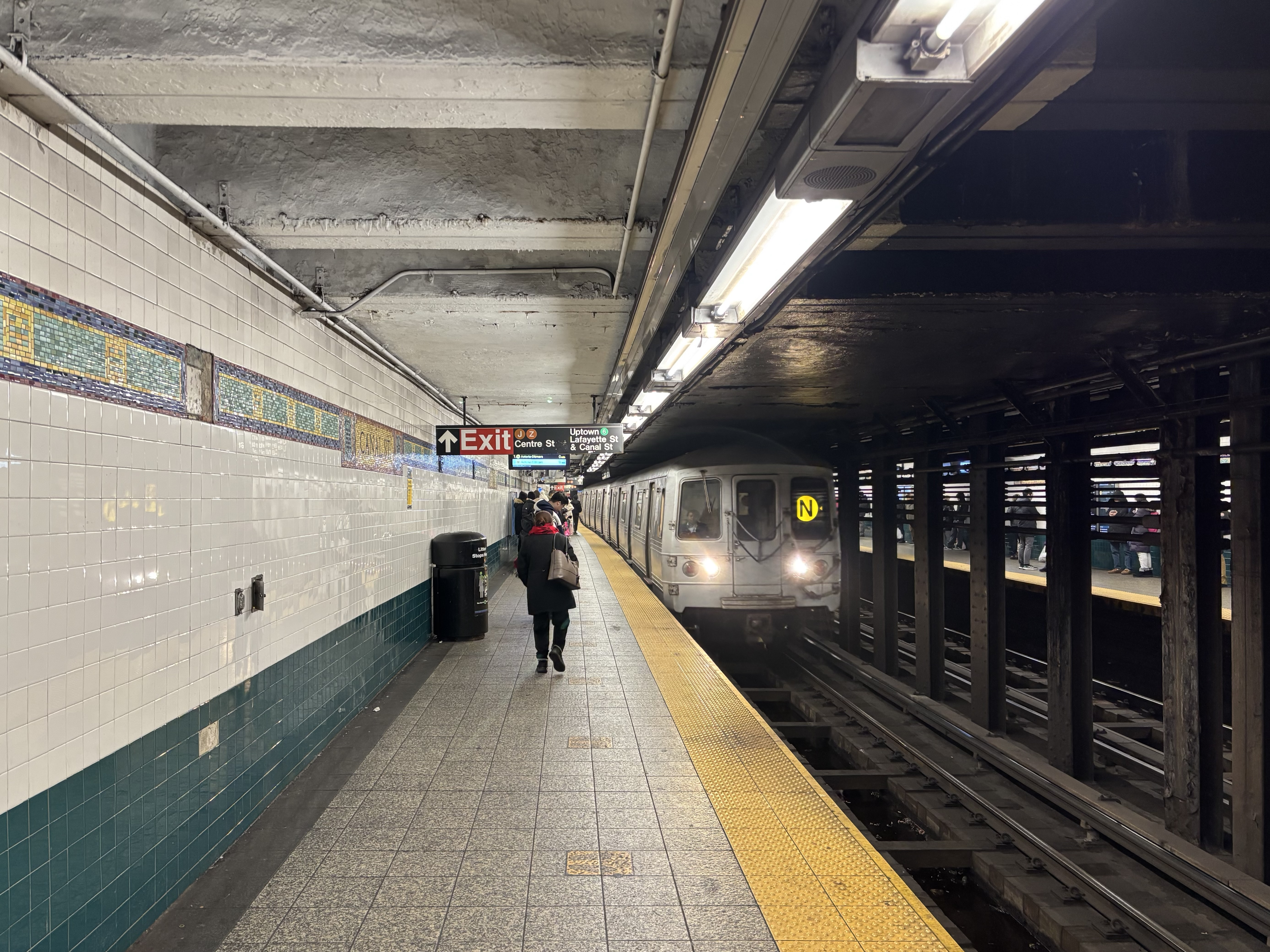
- R46 N train arriving at the northbound platform

Station statistics
- Division: B (BMT)
- Line: BMT Broadway Line
- Services: N (all except late nights); Q (all times)
- Structure: Underground
- Platforms: 2 side platforms
- Tracks: 2

Other information
- Opened: September 4, 1917; 109 years ago (Manhattan Bridge)
- Rebuilt: 2001
- Accessible: Partially; access to mezzanine only, access to platforms planned
Services
Preceding station	New York City Subway	Following station
Prince Street N Q local	Q (New York City Subway service)	DeKalb Avenue Q toward Coney Island–Stillwell Avenue
14th Street–Union Square N Q via Times Square–42nd Street	Q (New York City Subway service)	DeKalb Avenue Q toward Coney Island–Stillwell Avenue
14th Street–Union Square N Q via Times Square–42nd Street	N (New York City Subway service)	Atlantic Avenue–Barclays Center N Q toward Coney Island–Stillwell Avenue
Non-revenue services and lines
Preceding station	New York City Subway	Following station
	no service	Myrtle Avenue Fourth Ave local; demolished
Track layout
Lower level
Station service legend
Symbol	Description
Stops all times	Stops all times
Stops all times except late nights	Stops all times except late nights
Stops weekends during the day	Stops weekends during the day
Stops late nights only	Stops late nights only
Stops weekdays during the day	Stops weekdays during the day

The Canal Street station on the Manhattan Bridge route has two tracks and two side platforms. When it opened, this station was known as Broadway. The N stops here except at night when it stops at the mainline platforms, while the Q stops here at all times. West (railroad north) of this station, the N makes express stops on weekdays and local stops on weekends, while the Q makes express stops during the day and local stops during the night. The next stop to the west is Prince Street for local trains and 14th Street–Union Square for express trains. The next stop to the east (railroad south) is DeKalb Avenue for Q trains and Atlantic Avenue–Barclays Center for N trains.

Although technically located on the BMT Broadway Line, it was originally a distinct station from the mainline, connected only by a passageway. This passageway, accessed by a single stair at the end of either platform, leads to the underpass under the mainline platforms. Additional stairs on each platform lead up to the Nassau Street Line's western platform, the Lexington Avenue Line's southbound platform, and the Lexington Avenue Line's northbound platform.

West of the station, the bridge tracks curve to the north and ramp up between the tracks from the local upper-level platform to form the express tracks. The tunnel continues straight ahead, past the diverge to the mainline. The bellmouths going westward from the west end of the station are a provision from the original plans. East of the station, the tracks cross the south side of the Manhattan Bridge to enter Brooklyn. There are disused trackways leading to the north side tracks of the bridge, which trains from these platforms used to travel on. These tracks were disconnected with the opening of the Chrystie Street Connection in 1967 and no longer have rails or any other infrastructure.

=== Artwork detail ===
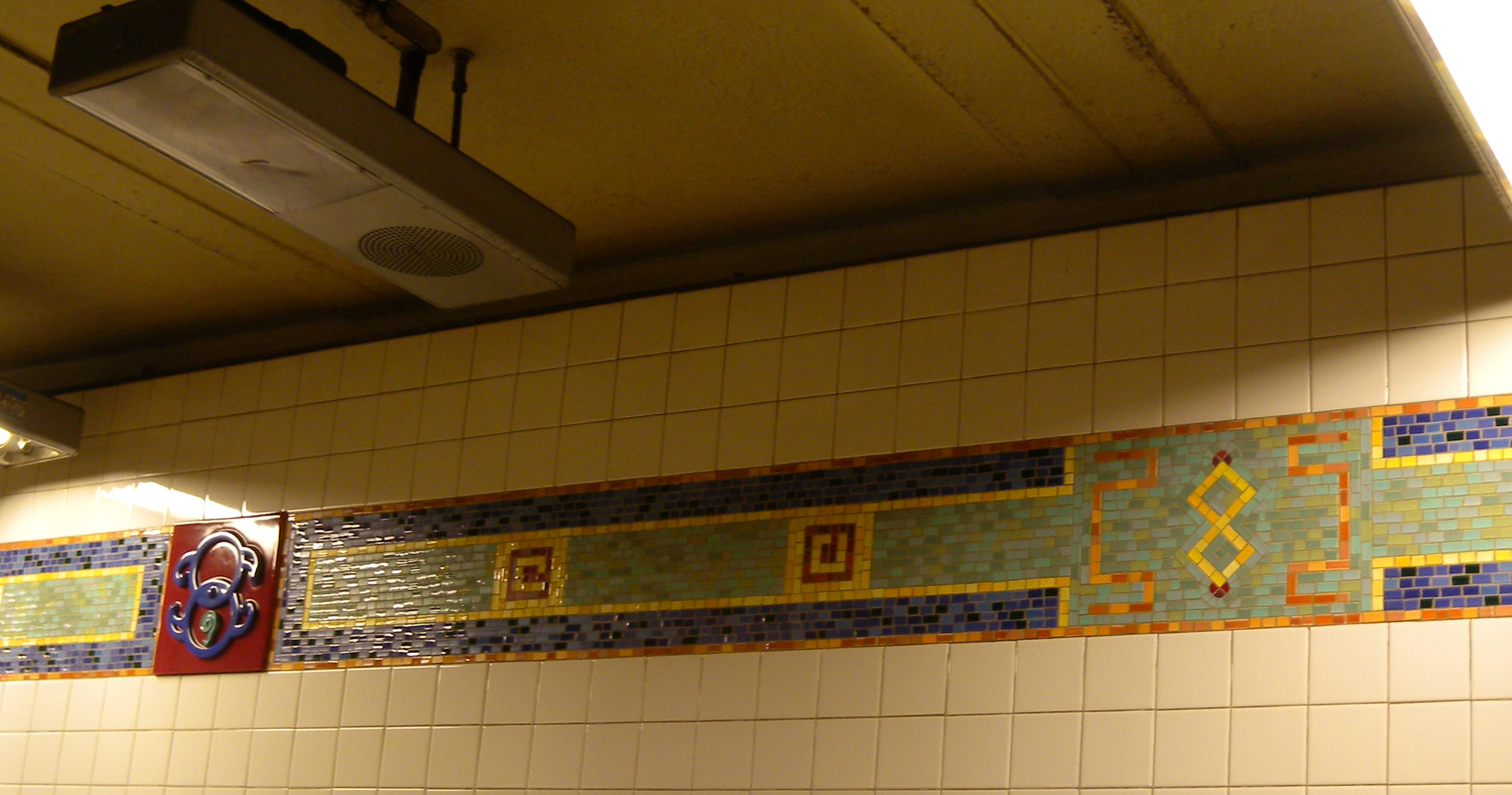
Mainline platform mosaic

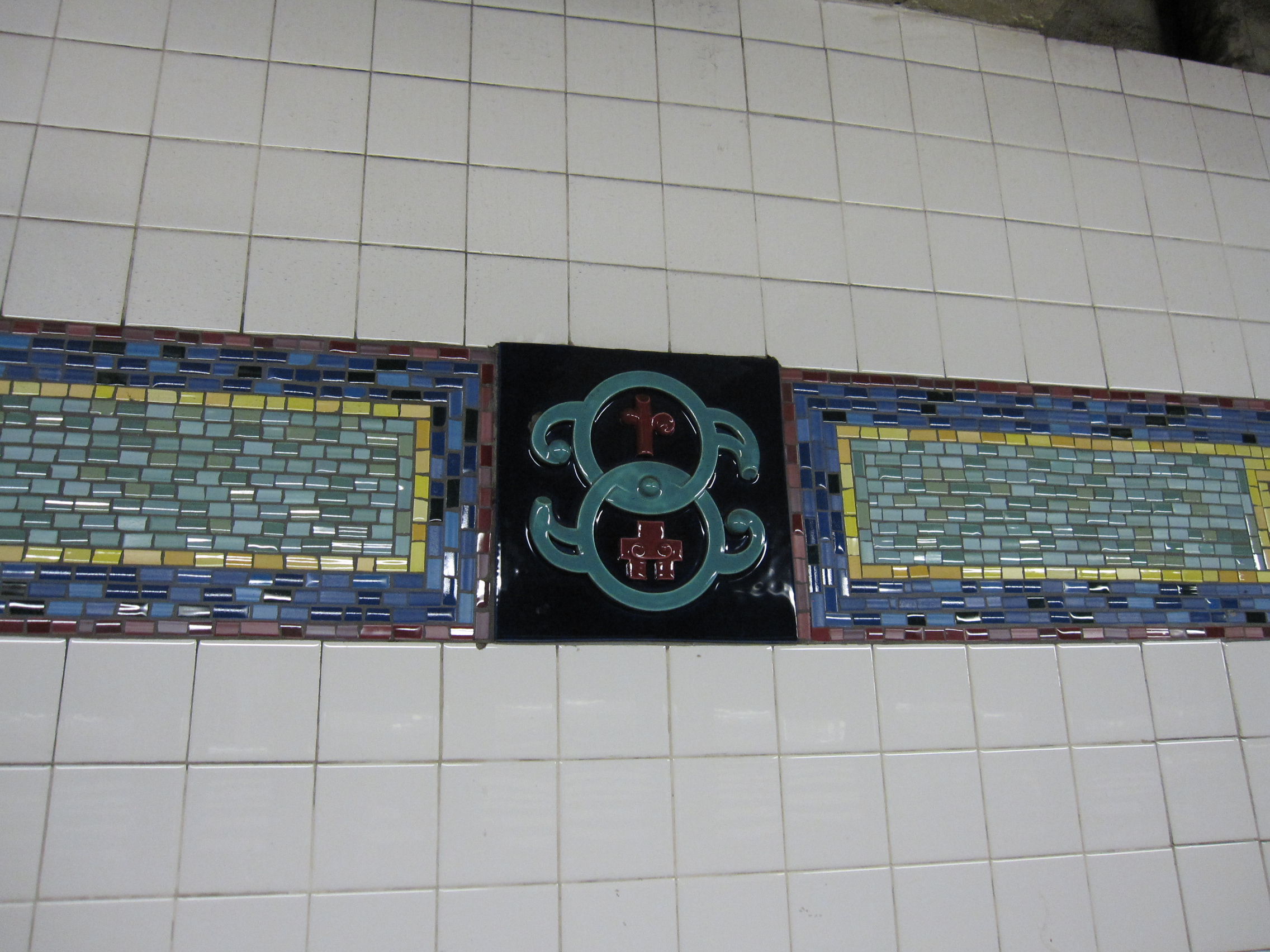
Bridge Line platform mosaic

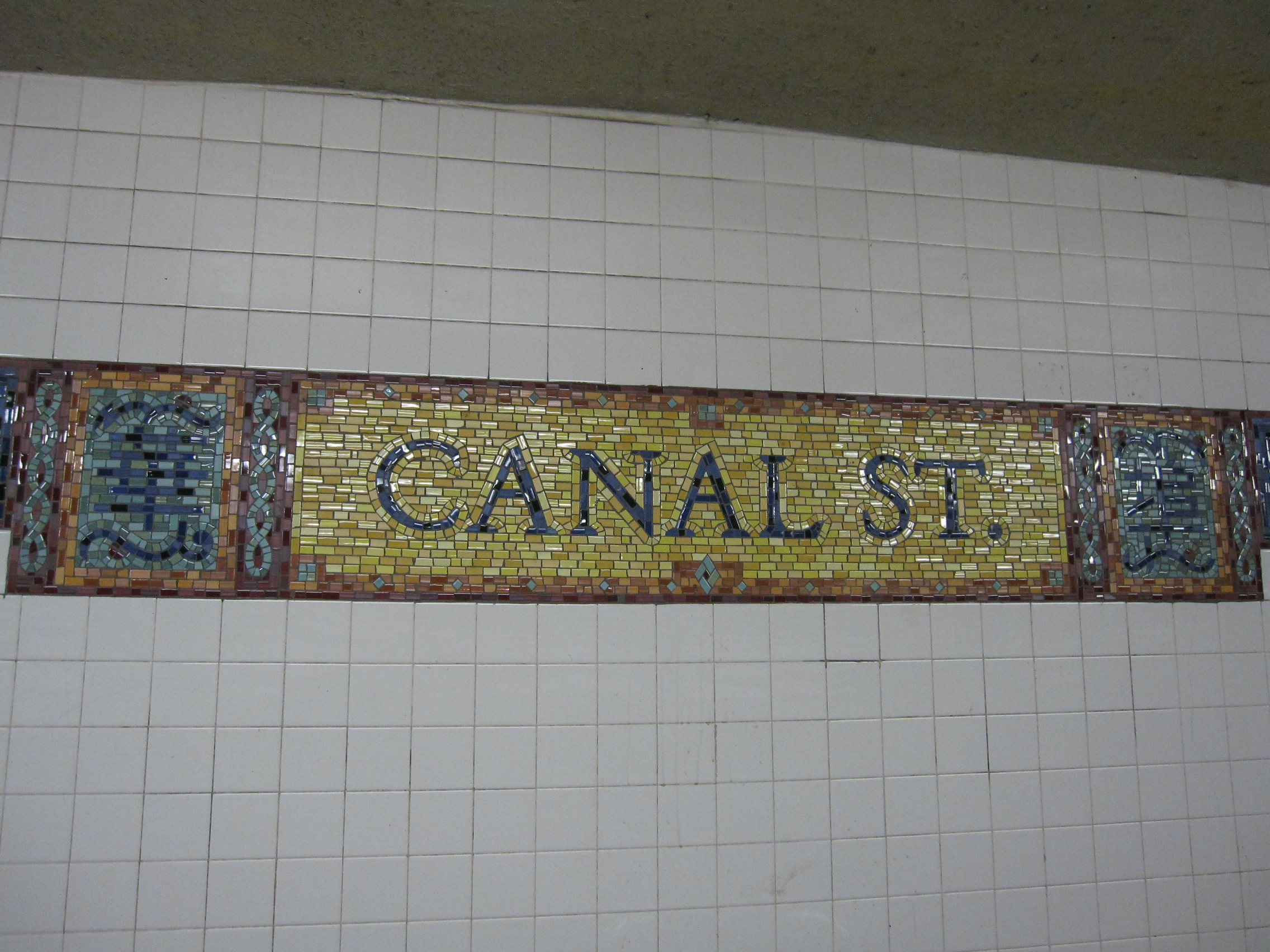
Name tablet mosaics

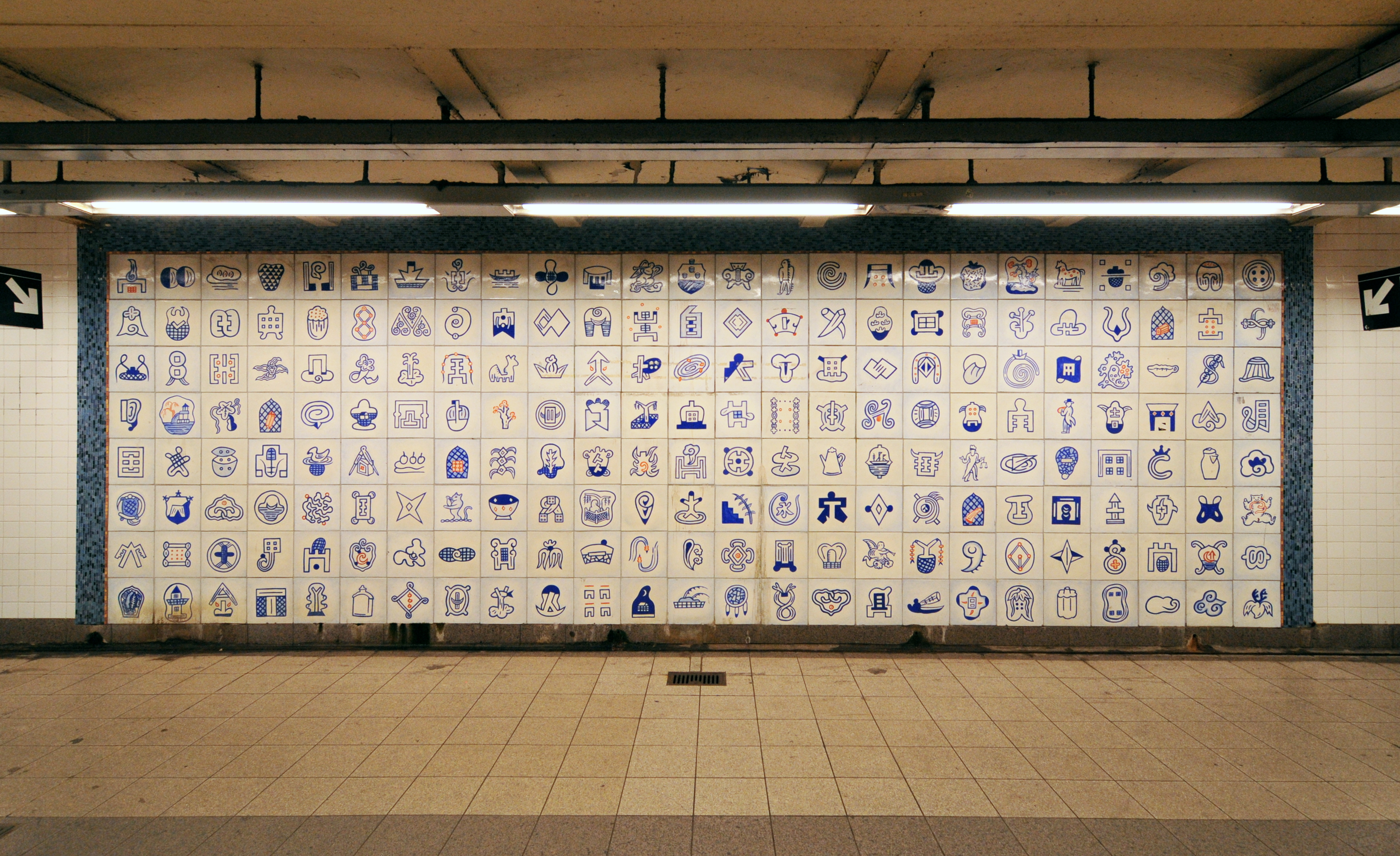
A permanent art installation titled Empress Voyage February 22, 1794 (1998) by Bing Lee in a passageway leading to the Bridge Line platforms
