= Channel =

Channel, channels, channeling, etc., may refer to:

== Geography ==
- Channel (geography), a landform consisting of the outline (banks) of the path of a narrow body of water.

=== Australia ===
- Channel Country, region of outback Australia in Queensland and partly in South Australia, Northern Territory and New South Wales.
- Channel Highway, a regional highway in Tasmania, Australia.

=== Europe ===
- Channel Islands, an archipelago in the English Channel, off the French coast of Normandy
- Channel Tunnel or Chunnel, a rail tunnel underneath the English Channel
- English Channel, called simply "The Channel", the part of the Atlantic Ocean that separates Great Britain from northern France

=== North America ===
- Channel Islands of California, a chain of eight islands located in the Pacific Ocean off the coast of Southern California, United States
- Channel Lake, Illinois, a census-designated place in Lake County, Illinois, United States
- Channels State Forest, a state forest in Virginia, United States
- Channel, Channel-Port aux Basques, Newfoundland, Newfoundland and Labrador, Canada; a town district

=== Other places ===
- Channel Glacier, a glacier in the Palmer Archipelago, Antarctica
- Channel Rock (disambiguation), various rocks

== Arts, entertainment, and media ==
=== Television ===
- Channel Television, a division of British ITV
- Channels TV, a Nigerian 24-hour news channel

=== Other uses in arts, entertainment, and media ===
- Channeler (The Wheel of Time), fictional characters in the Wheel of Time fantasy book series by Robert Jordan
- Channeling (Rolemaster), a magic element in the Rolemaster role-playing game
- Channels (band), fronted by former Jawbox singer/guitarist J. Robbins
- Channels (film), a 2008 film
- The Channel (film), a 2023 film
- Pre-chorus, or build or channel, part of a song structure of popular music

== Science and technology ==
=== Communications ===
- Communication channel, a transmission medium used to convey information
  - Audio channel, a communications channel in a storage device used in operations such as multitrack recording and playback
  - Channel (broadcasting), a range of frequencies assigned for the operation of a television, radio, or other broadcast station
    - Television channel, a television station or its cable/satellite counterpart
  - Channel (digital image), the grayscale representation of a primary color in a digital image
  - Channel (programming), in computer science, a tool used for interprocess communication
  - Channel I/O, in computing, a high-performance input/output (I/O) architecture
  - Video blog, hosted by a video-sharing website or channel

=== Other uses in science and technology ===
- Channel (semiconductor), a part of the structure of a field-effect transistor
- Ion channel, a protein that allows ion flow through a cell membrane
- Scattering channel, a concept in quantum mechanics
- Strut channel, a standardized formed structural system used in the construction and electrical industries
- Structural channel

== Brands and enterprises ==
- The Channel (nightclub), a music venue in Boston, Massachusetts, U.S.
- Channel Express, a defunct British airline
- Channel Home Centers, a defunct home improvement chain based in the northeastern United States

== Business and legal terms ==
- Channel (chart pattern), a pair of parallel trend lines that form a chart pattern for a stock or commodity
- Distribution channel, a chain of intermediaries, each passing the product down the chain to the next organization, before it finally reaches the consumer
- Legal channeling, the act of legally making one entity responsible for an event, and thereby dismissing other parties from liability
- Marketing channel, set of activities necessary to transfer the ownership of goods from the point of production to the point of consumption

== Sports ==
- Channel (association football), football (soccer) terminology for particular areas of the pitch
- Channel (horse), a racehorse
- Channel Football Club, an Australian football club in Tasmania

== Other uses ==
- Channel catfish, a catfish species in North America
- Meridian (Chinese medicine), or channels, a concept central to traditional Chinese medical techniques such as acupuncture, and to martial arts such as tai chi and qigong
- Mediumship or channelling, communication with spirits

== See also ==
- Canal (disambiguation)
- Chanel (disambiguation)
- Channeling (disambiguation)
