= Chanal =

Chanal may refer to:

- Chanal M.O (2012-present) singer/band.
- Chanal, Chiapas, a town in Mexico
- El Chanal, an archaeological site in Colima, Mexico
- Hatutu, an island in French Polynesia
- 5671 Chanal, a minor planet

== People with the surname ==
- Eugène Chanal (1868–1951), French politician
- Pierre Chanal (1946–2003), French soldier and suspected serial killer

== See also ==
- Channal, a village in India
- Chanel (disambiguation)
- Canal (disambiguation)
