= Channeling =

Channeling, or channelling, may refer to:

== Science ==
- Channelling (physics), the process that constrains the path of a charged particle in a crystalline solid
- Metabolite or substrate channeling in biochemistry and cell physiology

== Other ==
- Channeling (New Age), influences attributed to esoteric communications via a person described as a channel
- Chopping and channeling of an automobile's body
- Legal channeling, a contractual or legal redirection of responsibilities from an organization to another

== See also ==
- Channel (disambiguation)
