= Strut =

Structural component designed to resist longitudinal compression

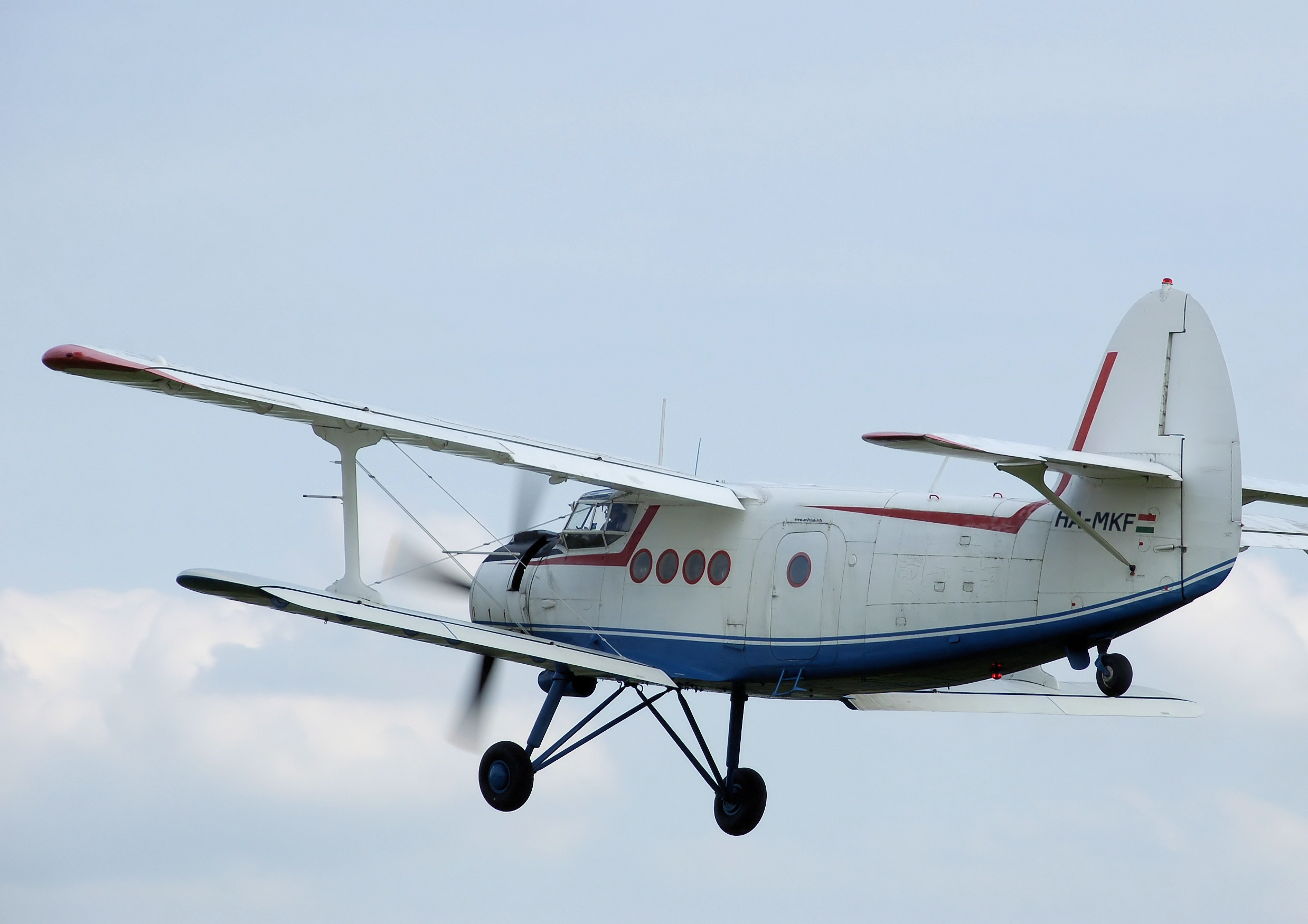
Struts on the undercarriage, wings and tailplane of an Antonov An-2 biplane

A strut is a structural component commonly found in engineering, aeronautics, architecture and anatomy. Struts generally work by resisting longitudinal compression, but they may also serve in tension.

A stay is sometimes used as a synonym for strut, but some sources distinguish that struts are braces for holding compressive forces apart, while stays are braces for keeping stretching forces together.

== Human anatomy ==
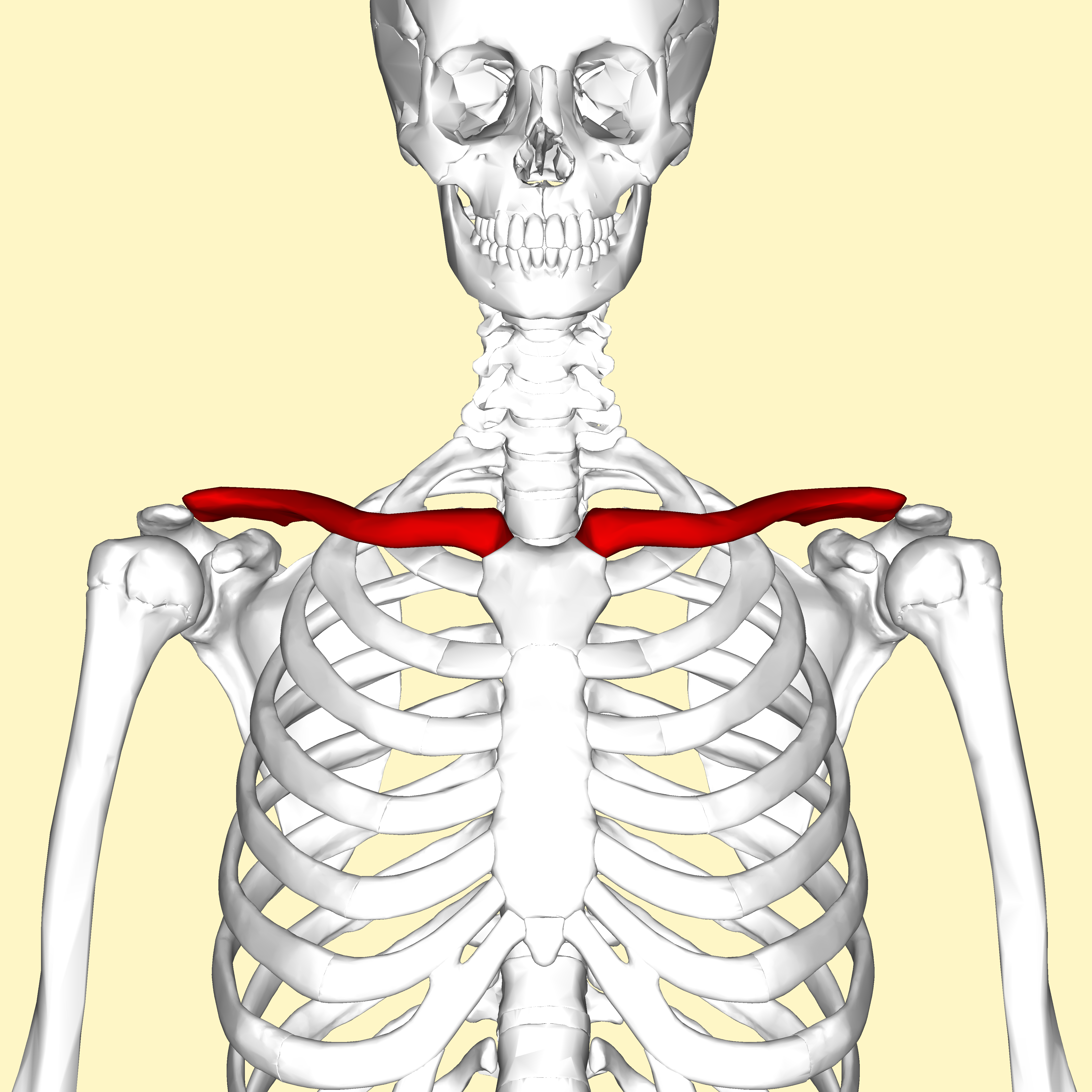
The clavicles (collarbones) serve as natural struts between the scapula and sternum, and play important roles in the motion of the arms.

Part of the functionality of the clavicle is to serve as a strut between the scapula and sternum, resisting forces that would otherwise bring the upper limb close to the thorax. Keeping the upper limb away from the thorax is vital for its range of motion. Complete lack of clavicles may be seen in cleidocranial dysostosis, and the abnormal proximity of the shoulders to the median plane in cases of this genetic condition exemplifies the clavicle's importance as a strut.

== Architecture and construction ==
Strut is a common name in timber framing for a support or brace of scantlings lighter than a post. Frequently struts are found in roof framing from either a tie beam or a king post to a principal rafter. Struts may be vertically plumb or leaning (then called canted, raking, or angled) and may be straight or curved. In the U.K., strut is generally used in a sense of a lighter duty piece: a king post carries a ridge beam but a king strut does not, a queen post carries a plate but a queen strut does not, a crown post carries a crown plate but a crown strut does not.

Strutting or blocking between floor joists adds strength to the floor system.

Struts provide outwards-facing support in their lengthwise direction, which can be used to keep two other components separate, performing the opposite function of a tie.

In piping, struts restrain movement of a component in one direction while allowing movement or contraction in another direction.

Strut channel made from steel, aluminium, or fibre-reinforced plastic is used heavily in the building industry and is often used in the support of cable trays and other forms of cable management, and pipes support systems.

== Aircraft ==
Bracing struts and wires of many kinds were extensively used in early aircraft to stiffen and strengthen, and sometimes even to form, the main functional airframe. Throughout the 1920s and 1930s they fell out of use in favour of the low drag cantilever construction. Most aircraft bracing struts are principally loaded in compression, with wires taking the tension loads. Lift struts came into increasing use during the changeover period and remain in use on smaller aircraft today where ultimate performance is not an issue. Typically, they are applied to a high wing monoplane and act in tension during flight.

Struts have also been widely used for purely structural reasons to attach engines, landing gear and other loads. The oil-sprung legs of retractable landing gear are still called Oleo struts.

== Bridges ==
In bridge design, stays are wire ropes that support the bridge deck. The stays run diagonally from a bridge tower to the bridge deck. The stays are in tension, and – unlike some solid struts used in other applications – cannot be used in compression. Stays are a critical component of cable-stayed bridges, and are also found in extradosed bridges. They are optionally used in suspension bridges.

== Automobiles ==
As components of an automobile chassis, struts can be passive braces to reinforce the chassis and/or body, or active components of the suspension. An example of an active unit would be a coilover design in an automotive suspension. The coilover combines a shock absorber and a spring in a single unit.

A common form of automotive suspension strut in an automobile is the MacPherson strut. MacPherson struts are often purchased by the automakers in sets of four completed sub-assemblies: These can be mounted on the car bodies as part of the manufacturers' own assembly operations. A MacPherson strut combines the primary function of a shock absorber (as a damper), with the ability to support sideways loads not along its axis of compression, somewhat similar to a sliding pillar suspension, thus eliminating the need for an upper suspension arm. This means that a strut must have a more rugged design, with mounting points near its middle for attachment of such loads.

Another common type of strut used in air suspension is an air strut which combines the shock absorber with an air spring and can be designed in the same fashion as a coilover device. These come available in most types of suspension setups including beam axle and MacPherson strut style design.

Transportation-related struts are used in "load bearing" applications ranging from both highway and off-road suspensions to automobile hood and hatch window supports to aircraft wing supports. The majority of struts feature a bearing, but only for the cases, when the strut mounts operate as steering pivots. For such struts, the bearing is the wear item, as it is subject to constant impact of vibration and its condition reflects both wheel alignment and steering response. In vehicle suspension systems, struts are most commonly an assembly of coil-over spring and shock absorber. Other variants to using a coil-over spring as the compressible load bearer include support via pressurized nitrogen gas acting as the spring, and rigid (hard tail) support which provides neither longitudinal compression/extension nor damping.

=== History ===
Struts were created in the 1970s in which automakers transitioned from large rear-wheeled drive vehicles to more fuel-efficient front-wheeled drive vehicles. The entire suspension system was changed in accordance to meet the new style of vehicles. The new styles of vehicles left less room for the traditional system, which was called the short-arm/ long-arm suspension systems. This caused the MacPherson strut system to become the new standard for all automobiles including front-wheeled and rear-wheeled vehicles. The MacPherson strut system does not require an upper control arm, bushings, or a pivot shaft like previous models.

=== Options on vehicles ===
Struts are not necessarily needed components on vehicles which separate the springs and shock absorbers, while the shocks support no weight. There are also some vehicles with the option of only having one pair of struts on one set of wheels while the other pair uses a separate selection of shocks and springs. This singular pair of struts are almost always a MacPherson strut. These choices are made for various reasons including the balance of initial cost, performance, and other elements. Some vehicles use a "double wishbone," suspension system which exclusively uses shock absorbers. Sports cars seem to favor this suspension style; however, the Porsche 911 favors traditional struts.

=== Maintenance ===
Struts keeps your suspension aligned, along with numerous other functions. To check if a set of struts is failing; simply walk to each side of the wheel and begin to bounce the car up and down. As the car is pushed down, let it bounce back into position. If it continues to bounce up and down, consider taking your vehicle to a mechanic for replacement. You can also check your strut car to see if it's leaking oil. Bad struts could possibly lead to many issues including the breaking of a wheel, flattening of a tire, damaged power steering, broken springs, broken joints, and many more issues in your suspension system. Keep all of these in mind as you drive your vehicle with bad struts.

== Gallery ==
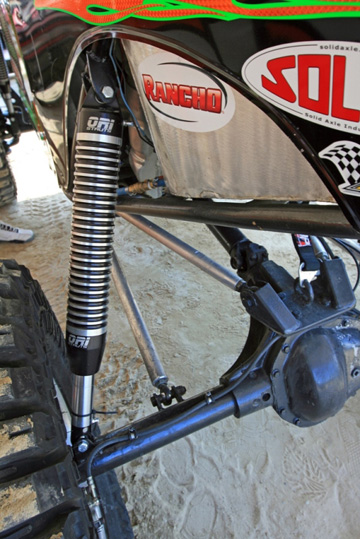
ORI strut, off-road application of strut

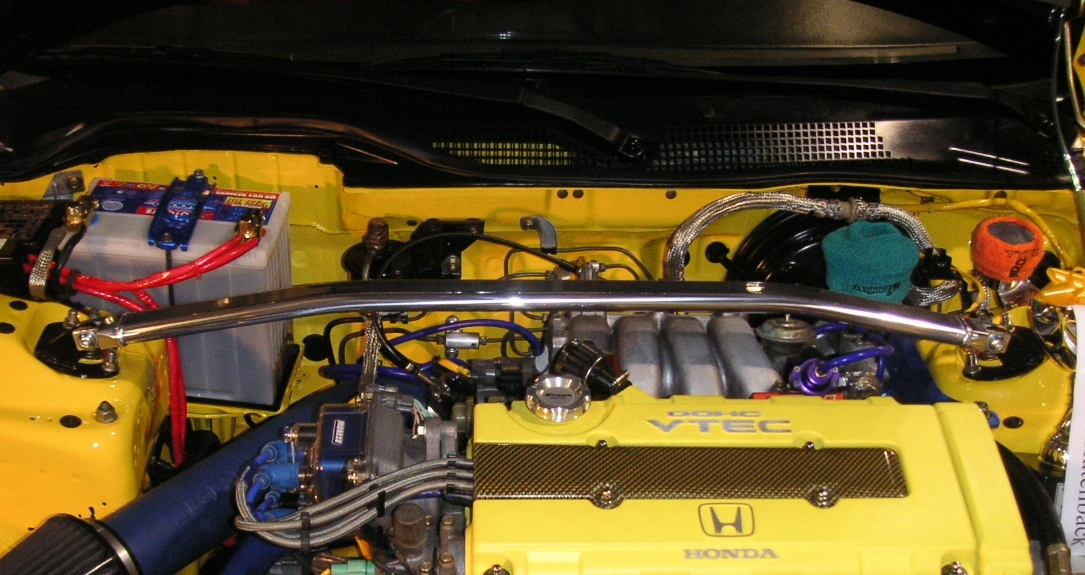
Strut bar

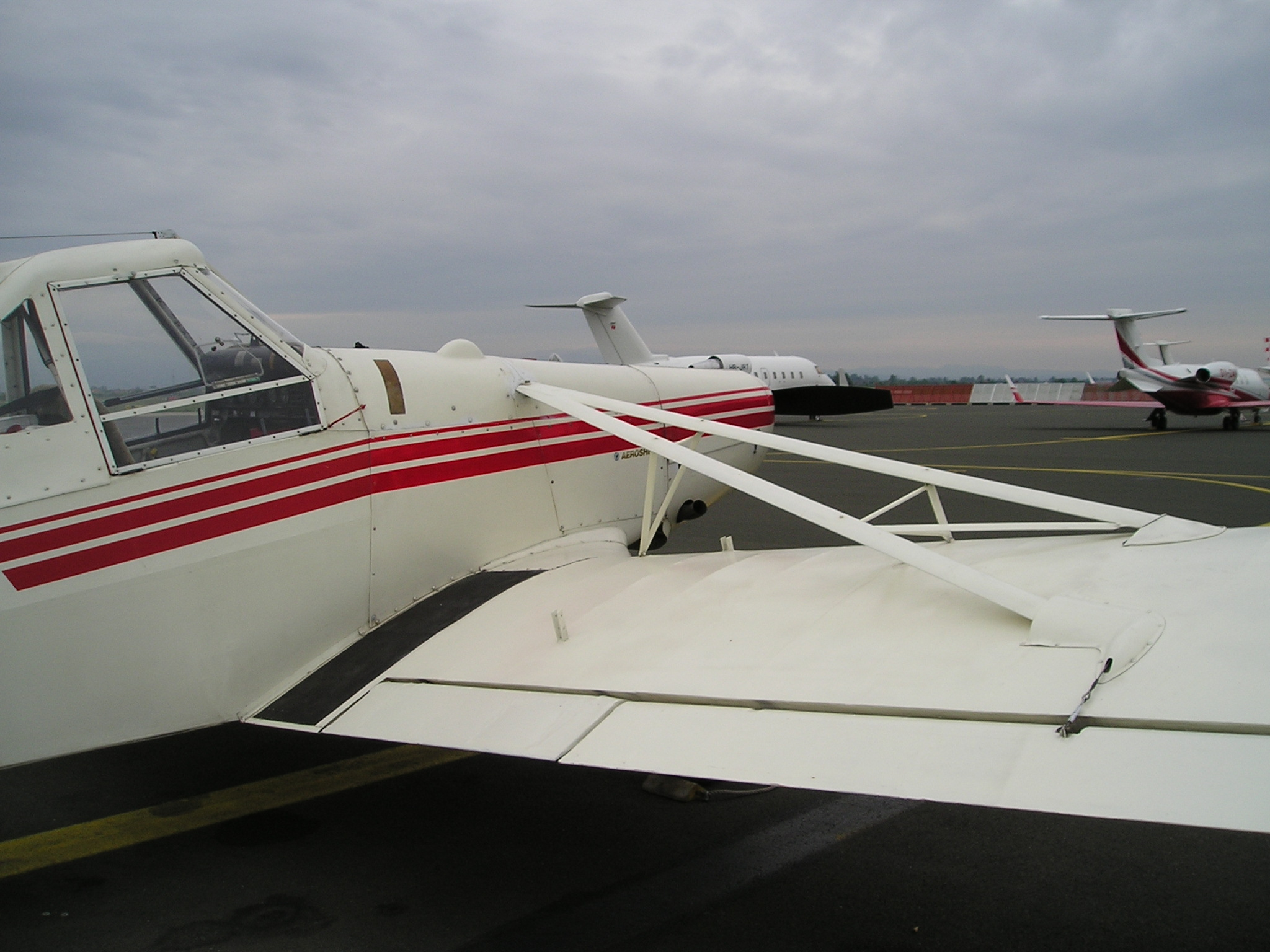
Compression strut on Piper Pawnee (low-wing aircraft)

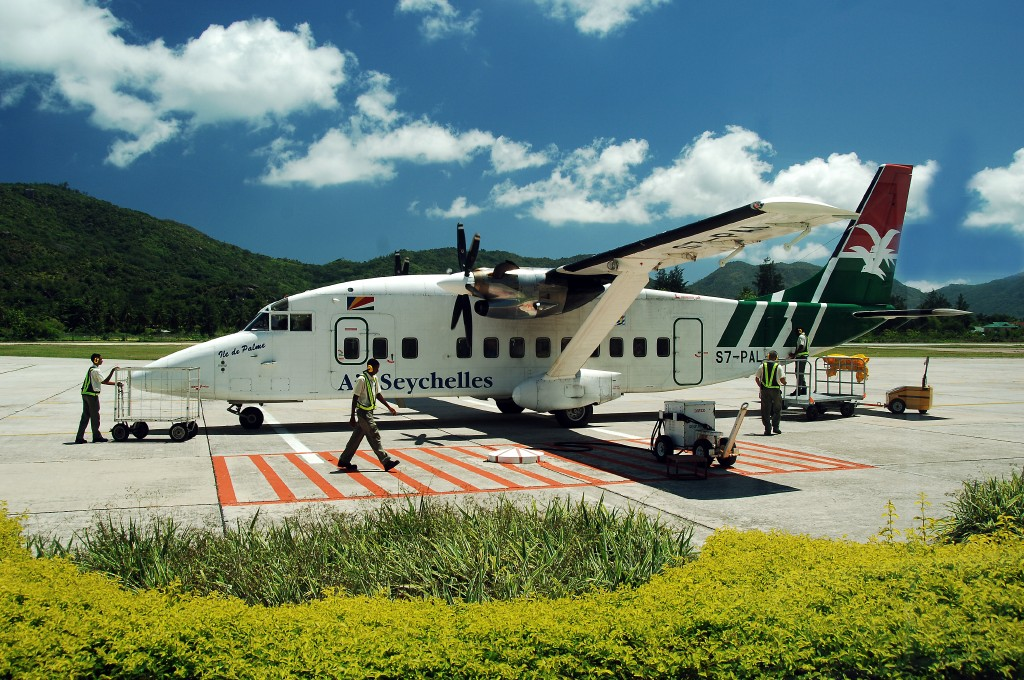
Tension strut on Shorts 360 (high-wing aircraft)

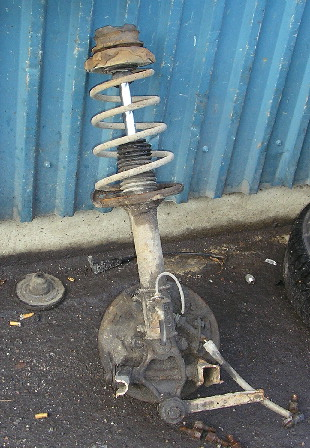
MacPherson strut suspension

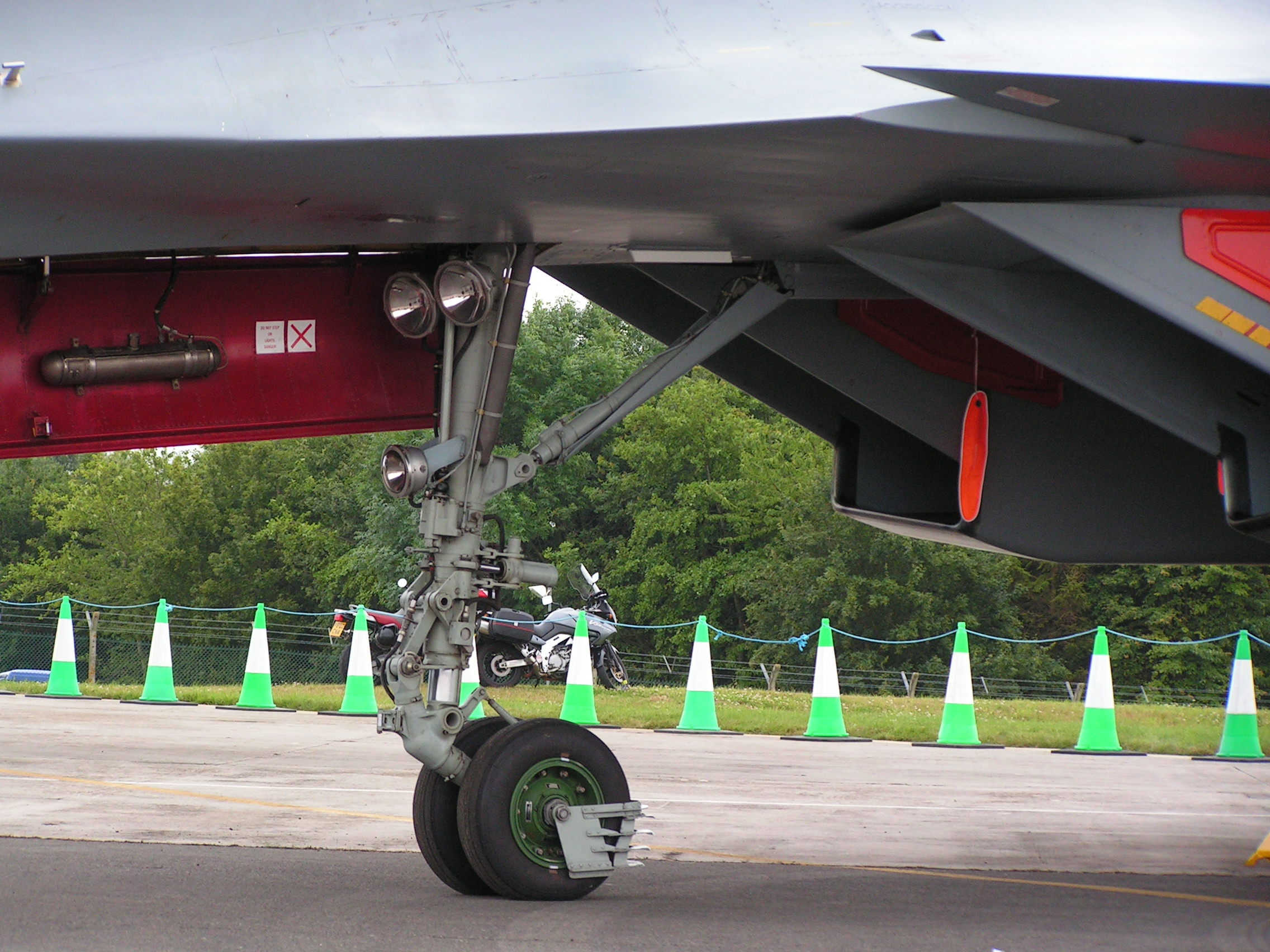
Nosewheel oleo strut on Su-30MKI aircraft

== See also ==
- Cabane strut
- Chapman strut
- Jury strut
- Lift strut
- Spacers and standoffs
- Strut bar
