= Chanel (disambiguation) =

Chanel is a French fashion house.

Chanel may also refer to:

== Places ==
- Chanol, also known as Chanel; a village in India

== People ==
- Coco Chanel (1883–1971), founder of the fashion house
- Peter Chanel (1803–1841), Catholic priest, missionary, and martyr
- Chanel Cole, singer (born 1977), finalist on Australian Idol
- Chanel Contos, Australian sexual consent activist
- Chanel Cresswell (born 1990), English actress, best known for playing Kelly in the film This is England
- Chanel Haynes (born 1978), singer and actress, formerly of gospel music group Trin-i-tee 5:7
- Chanel Iman (born 1990), American fashion model
- Chanel Kavanagh (born 1995), judoka from New Zealand
- Chanel Miller (born 1992), American writer
- Chanel Mokango (born 1988), Congolese professional basketball player
- Chanel Mosley, American politician
- Chanel Petro-Nixon (1989–2006), murder victim from Brooklyn, New York, United States
- Chanel Preston (born 1985), American pornographic actress
- Chanel Simmonds (born 1992), South African tennis player
- Chanel Rion (born 1990), American broadcaster
- Chanel Terrero (born 1991), Cuban-Spanish singer, dancer and actress, participant of the Eurovision Song Contest 2022
- Chanel West Coast (born 1988), American rapper, singer and television personality
- Chanel Wise (born 1985), beauty queen, 2007 Miss America contestant

== Arts and entertainment ==
- Rats & Star, Japanese pop music group known as Chanels until 1983
- "Chanel" (Frank Ocean song), 2017
- "Chanel" (Becky G and Peso Pluma song), 2023
- "Chanel" (Tyla song), 2025
- "Chanel (Go Get It)", a song by Young Thug from his 2018 mixtape Slime Language
- Chanel Oberlin, fictional character in the U.S. horror-comedy Scream Queens
  - The Chanels, Chanel Oberlin's minions, see List of Scream Queens characters
- Chanel Simmons, from the Disney Channel musical film trilogy The Cheetah Girls

== Other uses ==
- Chanel (dog), world's oldest dog, who died at the age of 21 on August 29, 2009
- Chanel College (disambiguation), various schools
- Chanel No. 5, perfume launched by Coco Chanel

== See also ==
- Channel (disambiguation)
- Chanal (disambiguation)
- Shannel
