= Channel Rock =

Channel Rock may refer to the following:

- Channel Rock (Hong Kong)
- Channel Rock (Argentine Islands) in Antarctica
- Channel Rock (McFarlane Strait) in Antarctica
- Channel Rock (Canada)

== See also ==
- Rock Channel, a connecting waterway between River Brede and River Tillingham
