= Gilean Douglas =

Canadian writer (1900–1993)

- Born: Gillian Joan Douglas; February 1, 1900; Toronto, Ontario
- Died: October 31, 1993 (aged 93); Cortes Island, British Columbia
- Spouse(s): Cecil Rhodes (m. 1922; div. 1925) Charles Norman Haldenby (m. 1927; abandoned 1927) Eric Altherr (m. 1939; div. 1942) Phillip Major (m. 1949; div. 1955)

Gillian (Gilean) Joan Douglas (February 1, 1900 – October 31, 1993) was a Canadian nature writer. While she was best known for her work as a poet, she was also an accomplished photo journalist, feminist, historian, and politician. Douglas' inspiration for her writing stemmed from her desire to be an independent woman in a patriarchal world. Her writings—her poems, articles, novels, and autobiographies—extend over a period of eighty years, including four marriages, ten years in the Cascade Mountains, and forty years on Cortes Island, British Columbia.

== Life ==
=== Early life ===
Douglas was born on February 1, 1900, in Toronto, Ontario, Canada into a wealthy family. She was the only child born to William Murray Douglas, a well-known lawyer in the Toronto area who was eventually appointed Queen's Counsel, and Eleanor (Nellie) Constance Coldham. Douglas attended private elementary school, took pride in her social background, and loved spending time in the outdoors. By age 5, she could already read, and by age 7, she was a regular contributor to a children's column in the Toronto News She spent much of her childhood vacationing in England, Europe, Canada, and America with her parents. Her mother died suddenly when she was 7 years old, and her father died from a heart attack when she was 16 years old. In her early teenage years, she changed her name from Gillian to Gilean; she decided to avert away from her inherited life of privilege and began doing farm service as a part of the war effort. This is when Gilean really started taking interest in the natural world. At age 19, she moved back to Toronto, although its natural environment contributed to her thyroid problems, and began working as a news reporter. Earning a salary of $25.00/week, she also became an official news reporter and editor of the children's page in the Toronto News. At this time, women did not have the right to vote and were overrepresented in fields of nursing and teaching. The First World War era instigated Douglas' interest in issues around gender inequality and women's economic independence.

=== Marriage and career ===
Despite her newfound interest in feminist thought, Douglas married Cecil "Slim" Rhodes (who adopted her last name) on February 17, 1922. Douglas, who at this time went under the nickname "Bobs," and "Slim" travelled around the Midwestern United States, staying in various tourist camps. It was on this trip that Douglas began taking an interest in photography. Douglas' journal entries reveal that Slim deserted her in 1925, so she returned to Toronto and began travelling around the Great Lakes researching the shipping conditions of the big freighters. For the two years that she was a journalist in this area, she also travelled around northern Ontario to camp, canoe, hunt, and ski with friends. Douglas continued her writing career and got involved with the YWCA when she moved to Reno, Nevada, in 1928. In July 1929, she remarried a man named Charles Norman Haldenby, who fled on their wedding night after "Slim" erratically showed up. Douglas' third marriage, to a chemical engineer, Eric Altherr, lasted 3 years, until both parties became involved with other people. She suffered her first and only miscarriage in 1934. Douglas' thirties were prolific years for writing poetry, especially about love, unreciprocated love, rejection, and the problems with marriage; however, the start of the Second World War marked a time of financial distress for Douglas. She decided to move into a cabin on the Coquihalla River on the west coast of British Columbia. She continued to write, under the pseudonym Grant Madison, with the inspiration for her writing stemming from being in the wilderness and working in her garden. Occasionally, she would travel to Vancouver to visit friends and conduct research and business; thus, she was not isolated in this small town. In 1939, Gilean purchased property in the Cascade Mountains. She began engaging in scientific observation studies of flowers, plants, animals, and geography in order to emphasize their aesthetic and spiritual value in her writing. Regrettably, in 1947, a fire destroyed her cabin, where she spent the seven happiest years of her life. Left with virtually nothing, Douglas was forced to move. She ended up on Keats Island, just northwest of Vancouver, met a man named Philip Major, whom she married on June 1, 1949, and bought property in Whaletown on Cortes Island. Her involvement with the Women's Auxiliary to the Anglican Church, the Whaletown Community Club, and the Women's Institute, which advocated for local improvement on women's education, led to her separation and divorce from her fourth and final husband in the early 1950s. Douglas never had any children. Her new role as a weather observer for Environment Canada, along with her interest in conducting research on remote settlements of coastal British Columbia, forced her to step down from her administrative position with the Women's Institute in 1960. From 1973 to 1978, she acted as the director of the Advistory Planning Commission and the Environmental Committee for the Comox-Strathcona Regional District; her role involved the regulation of land use (zoning, pollution and waste management, and transportation), the preservation of wetlands, and salmon habitat enhancement. For 31 years (1961–1992), Douglas had a column in the Victoria Daily Colonist called Nature Rambles.

=== Later life and death ===
Douglas struggled with a lifelong thyroid problem but refused surgery all through her life. In 1992, she became increasingly sick and was advised to sell her property on Cortes Island; however, she refused any offers on her cabin and at the same time, refused old age pension. In 1993, she was airlifted to the hospital in Campbell River but recovered and returned to her home on Cortes Island where she died, surrounded by friends and loved ones, on October 31, 1993.

== Douglas and the environment ==
Douglas lived to be ninety-three and accomplished a lot as a journalist, a historian, a feminist, and a nature writer. The themes embedded in her writings and her photographs were fundamentally linked to her experiences with nature and the wilderness; her love for nature and her love for writing are thus intertwined. Douglas’ sense of place, home, and spirituality was essentially embedded in her natural surroundings—from the Cascade Mountains to Cortes Island. Like many other nature writers, Douglas maintained the duality of losing herself in the natural world in order to uncover a stronger sense of being. Throughout her life, she wrote about her connection with all things natural, including plants, animals, and geographical entities. Her writing conveys the notion that humans do not have ownership over the land but rather a responsibility to respect and care for it. Her central philosophy was that humans would be able to discover a sense of being and belonging if they balanced their needs with the needs of the natural world. Douglas was writing at a time when environmental concerns, including issues of preservation, restoration, and sustainability, were not heavily recognized or supported in society. She wanted to raise awareness about destructive land use, which was destroying the very environment that attracted other people to her home—in particular, Cortes Island. Douglas never wrote about her hardship and affliction of living in the wilderness; she was more so concerned with the future destruction of her environment. Her academic, recreational, and occupational positions—from a weather observer to a photojournalist to a wilds adventurer—were deeply involved with nature in some way or another. Her work with Environment Canada, the Comox-Strathcona Regional District, and the YWCA were efforts to motivate an environmental movement and instigate concern for the natural world. For a large part of her life, Douglas lived alone. She understood her solitude as something that could inspire love and devotion to nature—not only for herself, but for society as a whole.

== Chronology ==
- 1898 December 17: Marriage of William Murray Douglas and Eleanor Constance Coldham, Toronto
- 1900 February 1: Birth of Gillian (Gilean) Joan Douglas, Toronto
- 1907 March 5: Death of Eleanor Douglas
- 1916 January 9: Death of William Douglas
- 1922 February 17: First marriage to Cecil "Slim" Rhodes, Hamilton
- 1924 December: Separation from Cecil "Slim" Rhodes Douglas
- 1929 July 27: Second marriage, to Charles Horman Haldenby, Toronto
- 1933 August 17: Divorce from Cecil "Slim" Rhodes, Reno
- 1933 August 29: Third marriage, to Eric Altherr, Chicago
- 1938 October: Move to West Coast
- 1942 June 24: Divorce from Eric Altherr
- 1947 May 5: Cabin in Cascade Mountains destroyed by fire
- 1948 Purchase of Cortes Island property
- 1949 June 1: Fourth marriage, to Philip Major
- 1953 November: Separation from Philip Major
- 1955 Divorce from Philip Major
- 1993 October 31: Death of Gilean Douglas on Cortes Island

== Works ==
=== Poetry collections ===
- Now the Green Word (1952)
- Poetic Plush (1953)
- The Pattern Set (1958)
- Seascape with Figures (1967)
- Now in This Night (1973)
- Prodigal (1982)
- Kodachromes at Midday (1985)
- Seascape with Figures: Poems Selected and New (1992)

=== Nature and non-fiction collections ===
- River For My Sidewalk (1953), published under the pseudonym Grant Madison, reprinted 1984
- Silence Is My Homeland: Life on Teal River (1978)
- The Protected Place (1979)

=== Autobiographical collections ===
- A February Face, unfinished and unpublished
- My Dear Husbands, unfinished and unpublished

=== Articles ===
- Modern Pioneers (1959), a history of British Columbia Women's Institutes (Editor)

=== Magazine and newspaper contributions ===
- Douglas' work has been published in innumerable magazines and newspapers in Canada and the United States of America, including:

American Nature, Canadian Home Journal, Canadian Mining Journal, Canadian Poetry, Chatelaine, Dalhousie Review, Family Herald, Forest & Outdoors, Nature Magazine, Ottawa Citizen, Outdoor Canada, Reader's Digest, Saturday Evening Post, Saturday Night, Seattle Times, Toronto Star, Vancouver Sun, and The Villager

== See also ==
- Channel Rock (Canada)

== Sources ==
- Milton, Gillian. (1999). "Gilean Douglas, 1900-1993" (PDF). The Library of the University of British Columbia Special Collections and University Archives Division. Retrieved on 2008-11-17.
- Twigg, Alan. (2003). "Douglas, Gilean". BCBW. Retrieved on 2008-11-17.
- Lebowitz, A., & Milton, G. (1999). Gilean Douglas: Writing Nature, Finding Home. Victoria, British Columbia, Canada: Sono Nis Press.
- Lebowitz, Andrea. (1998). "Narratives of Coming Home: Gilean Douglas and Nature Writing ". Canadian Poetry: Studies/Documents/Reviews. Retrieved 2008-11-17.
- "Gilean Douglas, 1900-1993, "The Douglas Archives" clan history website
