= Channel Rock (Canada) =

Natural reserve on Cortes Island

Coordinates: 50.0950°N 125.0351°W

Channel Rock is a nature reserve and eco-retreat centre on Cortes Island in the Northern Gulf Islands of British Columbia, Canada. It is located within the traditional territories of the Wei We Kai, Kwiakah, Homalco, Klahoose and Sliammon peoples.

== History ==
Channel Rock was originally the private home of writer and poet, Gilean Douglas, who owned and homesteaded the 140-acre for 40 years from 1953. In 1979 she published "The Protected Place" in which she wrote about the changing seasons at Channel Rock. After her death in 1993, the new owners were instrumental in the formation of the registered non-profit The Friends of Channel Rock Society which now runs Channel Rock as a nature reserve and retreat.
