= Channel (association football) =

Certain areas of the pitch in association football

In association football, channels is the name given to certain areas of the pitch, created by the space between players and groups of players.

There are two types of channels, vertical (between full backs and their closest centre back), and horizontal (between defence, midfield, and attack).

== Vertical channels ==
The channels are subjectively described (there is no specific marking of the pitch) as the areas in which wide-playing strikers look to receive the ball, being a vertical strip extending from the halfway line to the goal line, and close to, but not too near the edge of the pitch, just inside the touchline, an area more commonly occupied by a winger.

By receiving the ball in the channel, a striker hopes to confuse the opposing defence, as he is between the full-back and centre-back, and makes them unsure as to who should mark or close down the striker, this thinking time allows the striker more time on the ball, and also distracts the defence from other players who are making runs.

== Horizontal channels ==
These channels are the areas created between the defence and midfield (usually occupied by that team's defensive midfielder/anchor man, or the opposition's advanced playmaker/deep lying forward), and midfield and attack (usually occupied by that team's advanced playmaker/deep playing forward, or the opposition's defensive midfielder/anchor man). Formations that usually create these channels are the 4–4–2, 5–4–1, 5–3–2. In modern times, formations have been developed to cancel out these channels, examples of these formations include the 4–2–3–1, 4–3–2–1, 4–4–2 diamond.

An example of the use of this is the FC Barcelona team, who use a fluid (meaning the players are free to move around and exchange positions) 4–3–3 formation to use the channels created by the oppositions formation to gain an advantage, e.g. Xavi with the ball in midfield, passing to one of the front three players who start either in the oppositions defensive zone, and drops back towards his midfield, or starting in the oppositions midfield zone, and moves forward. Barcelona's formation, as well as taking advantage of opposition's channels, also looks to cancel out the chance of their own team creating them, with the use of Sergio Busquets as a defensive midfielder, who looks to occupy the space between his back four and midfield three.
