= Eugène Chanal =

French politician

Eugène Chanal (28 July 1868, Nantua - 8 March 1951) was a French politician belonging to the Radical Party. He was a member of the Chamber of Deputies from 1902 to 1919 and Senator from 1920 to 1940. On 10 July 1940 he voted in favour of granting the Cabinet presided by Marshal Philippe Pétain authority to draw up a new constitution, thereby effectively ending the French Third Republic and establishing Vichy France.
