= Strut channel =

Folded metal struts used in construction

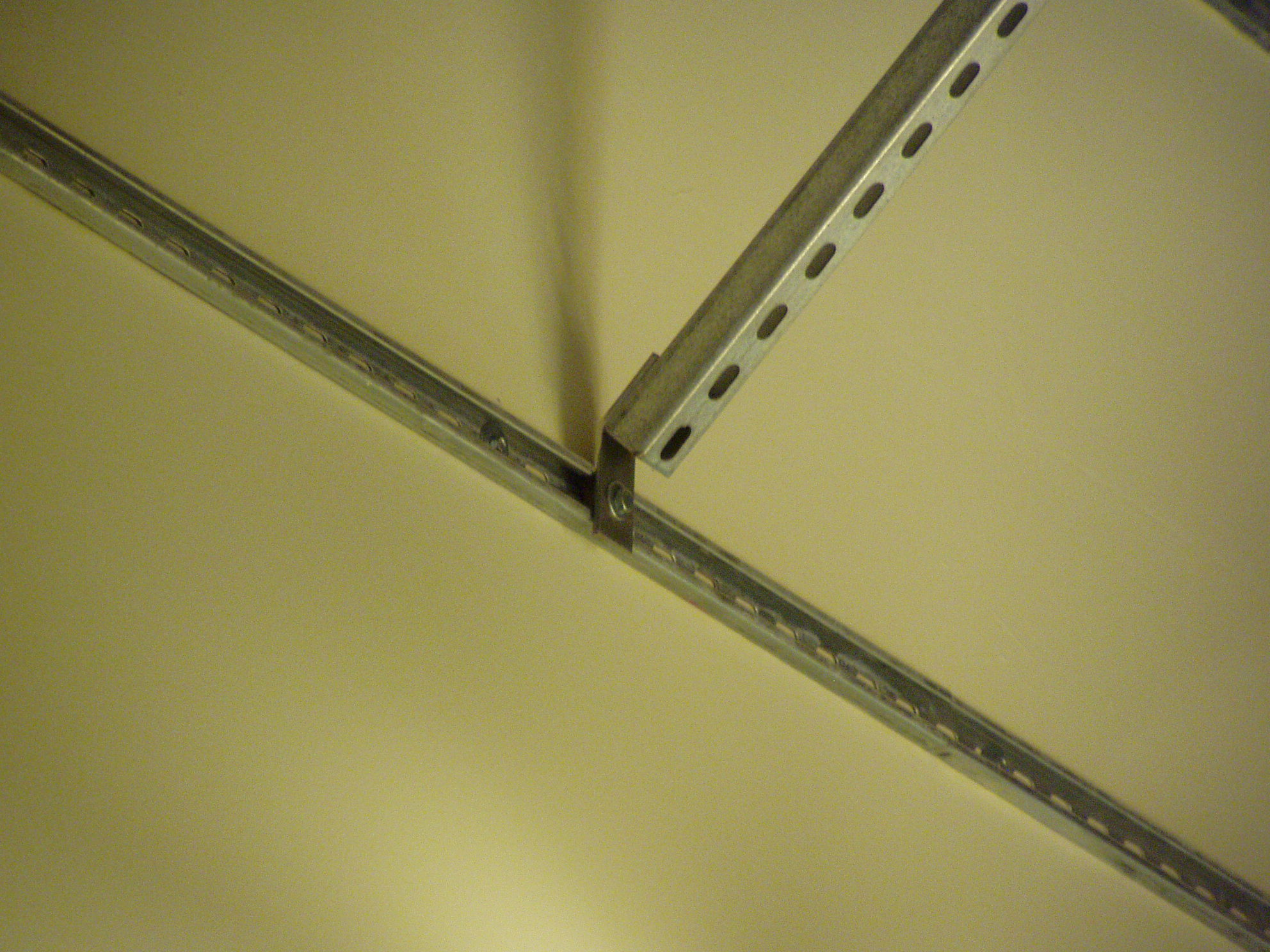

Strut channel, often referred to colloquially by one of several manufacturer trade names, is a standardized formed structural system used in the construction and electrical industries for light structural support, often for supporting wiring, plumbing, or mechanical components such as air conditioning or ventilation systems.

A strut is usually formed from a metal sheet, folded over into an open channel shape with inwards-curving lips to provide additional stiffness and as a location to mount interconnecting components. Increasingly, struts are being constructed from fiberglass, a highly corrosion-resistant material that's known for its lightweight strength and rigidity. Struts usually have holes of some sort in the base, to facilitate interconnection or fastening strut to underlying building structures.

The main advantage of strut channels in construction is that there are many options available for rapidly and easily connecting lengths together and other items to the strut channel, using various specialized strut-specific fasteners and bolts. They can be assembled very rapidly with minimal tools and only moderately trained labor, which reduces costs significantly in many applications. A strut channel installation also can often be modified or added-to relatively easily if needed. The only alternative to strut channels for most applications is custom fabrication using steel bar stock and other commodity components, requiring welding or extensive drilling and bolting, which has none of the above advantages.

The basic typical strut channel forms a box measuring about 1 5/8 inches (41 mm) square. There are several additional sizes and combined shapes manufactured.

== Shapes ==
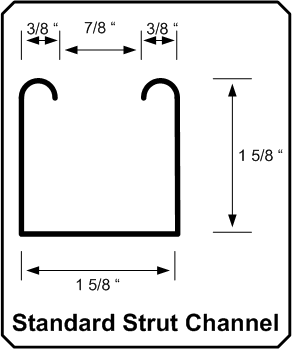
Cross section diagram of standard strut channel

Basic strut channel comes in the open box section 1 5/8 in (41 mm) square. A half height 1 5/8 in × 13/16 in (41 mm × 21 mm) version is also available, used mostly where mounted directly to a wall as it has significantly less stiffness and ability to carry loads across an open space or brace. A deep channel 1 5/8 in × 2 7/16 in (41 mm × 62 mm) version is also manufactured.

The material used to form the channel is typically sheet metal with a thickness of 1.5 mm or 2.5 mm (12 or 14 gauge; 0.1046 inch or 0.0747 inch, respectively).

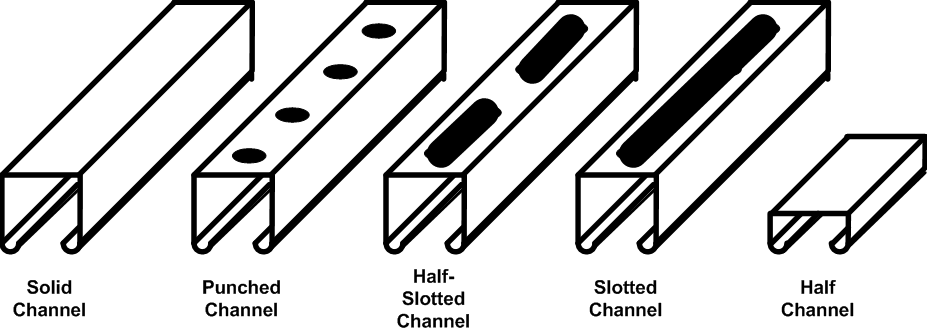
Types of channel

Several variations are available with different hole patterns for mounting to walls and supports. Solid channel has no holes predrilled, and must either be drilled on site or mounted in another fashion. Punched channel has round holes, large enough for an M16 or 5/8 inch threaded steel rod or bolts, punched in the top of the channel at regular 48 mm (1 7/8 inch) centers. Half-slot channel has short, rounded end rectangular slots punched out on 50 mm (2 inch) centers. Slot channel has longer slots on 100 mm (4 inch) centers. In metric system based products, the eyelets are about 11×13 mm.

In addition, shapes are manufactured with two lengths of channel welded together back to back, or three or four welded together in various patterns, to form stronger structural elements.

== Materials ==
Strut is normally made of sheet steel, with a zinc coating (galvanized), paint, epoxy, powder coat, or other finish.

For specialized applications (corrosive environments, food processing facilities, lightweight structures) strut channels may also be manufactured from stainless steel, aluminum, or fiberglass.

== Standards ==
The Metal Framing Manufacturers Association (MFMA) defines a standard for strut channel construction that allows multiple manufacturers' channels to be compatible. The current version of the standard, as of 2020, is MFMA-4. Well-known manufacturers of strut channel, including Unistrut U.S., Cooper Industries/Eaton Corporation, and Thomas & Betts Corp./ABB Group, are members of the MFMA and defined the standard.

== Interconnection ==
The inwards-facing lips on the open side of strut channel are routinely used to mount special nuts, braces, connecting angles, and other types of interconnection mechanism or device to join lengths of strut channel together or connect pipes, wire, other structures, threaded rod, bolts, or walls into the strut channel structural system.

== Usage ==
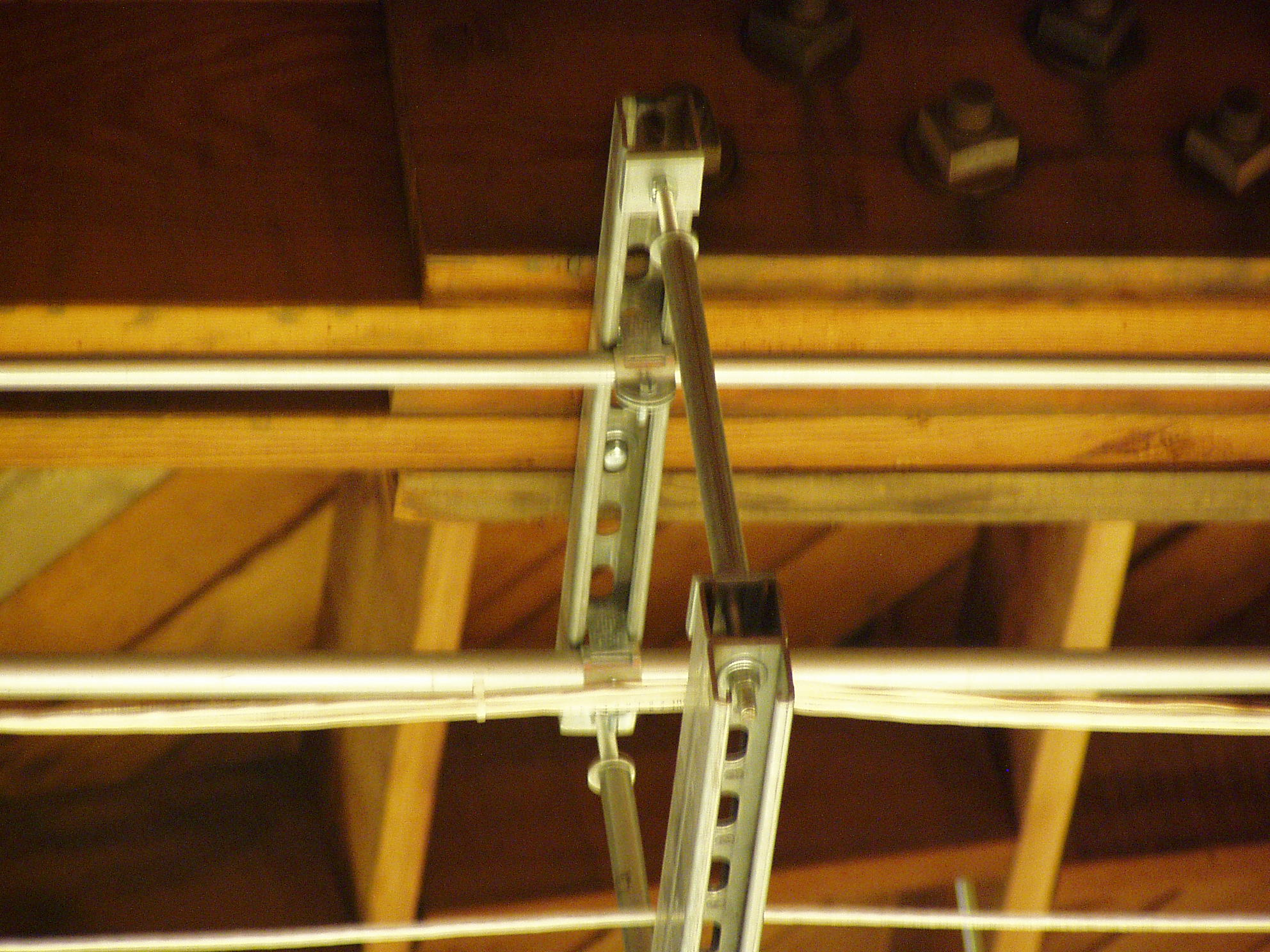
An overhead electrical wire hanger manufactured from two lengths of strut channel and two lengths of threaded rod

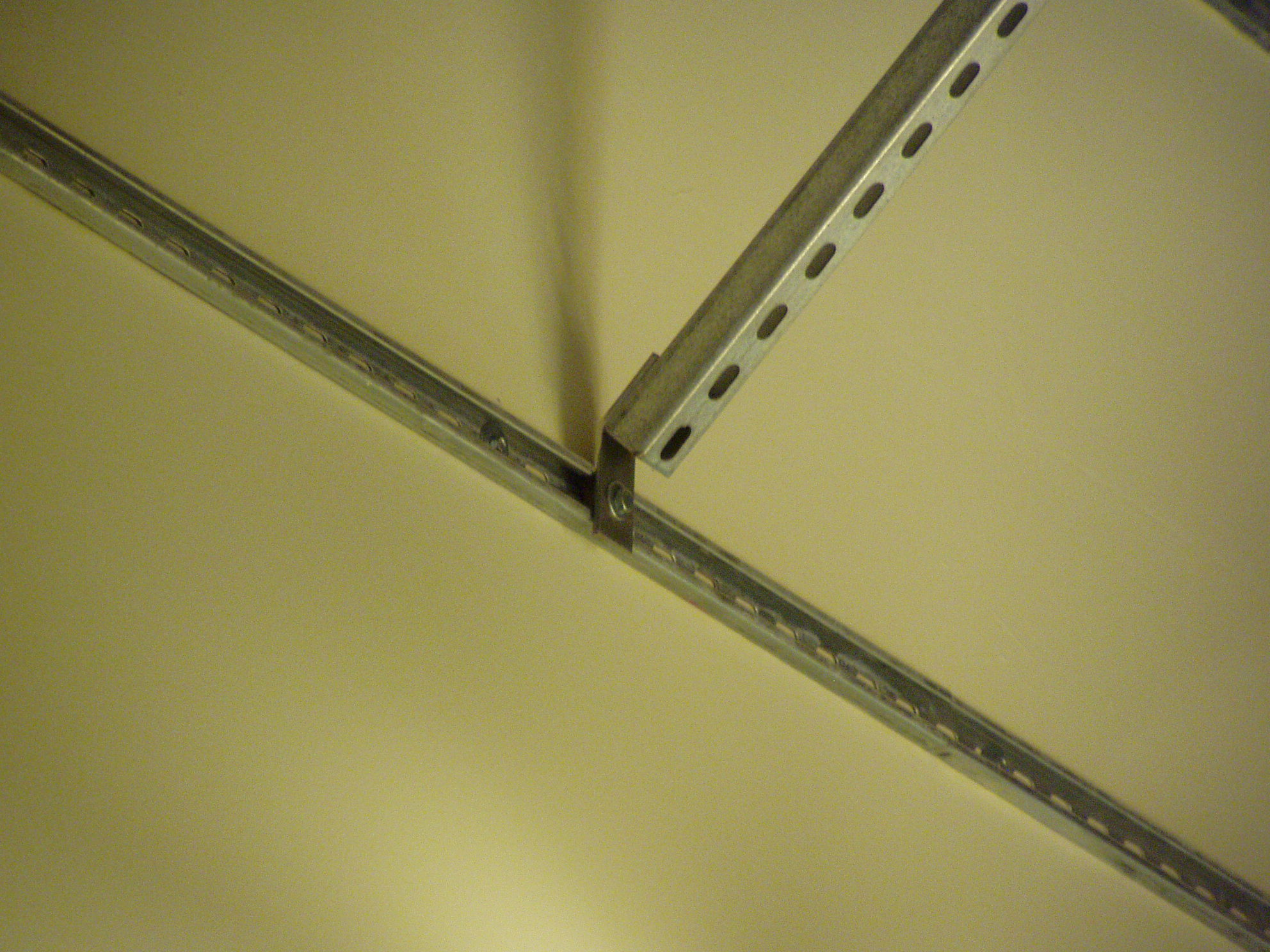
A length of standard half-slotted strut channel used as a brace, connected to a length of half-channel mounted directly to a wall, joined with a purpose-built channel connecting steel angle

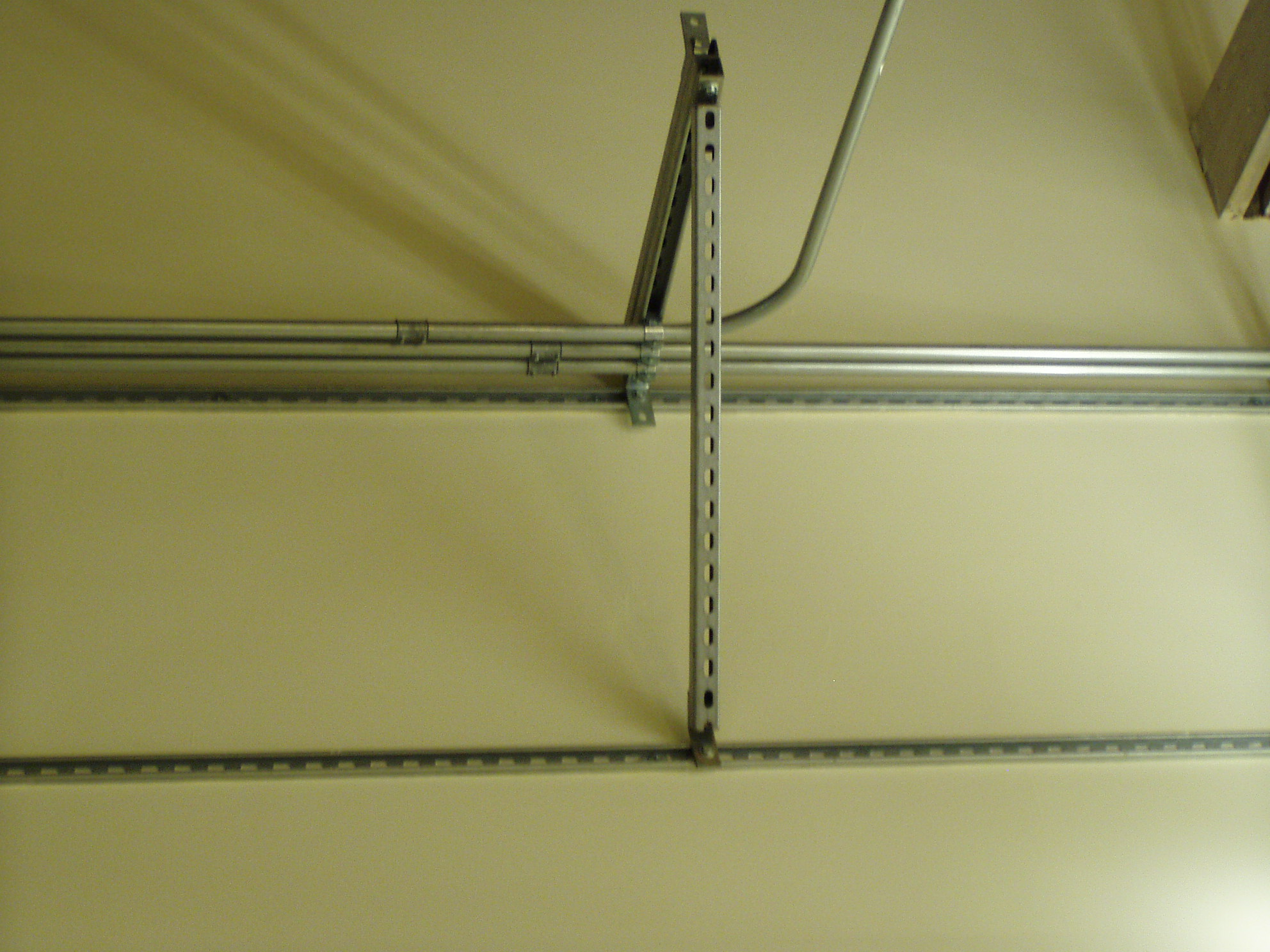
A shelf supporting electrical conduit and pipe, manufactured from strut channel

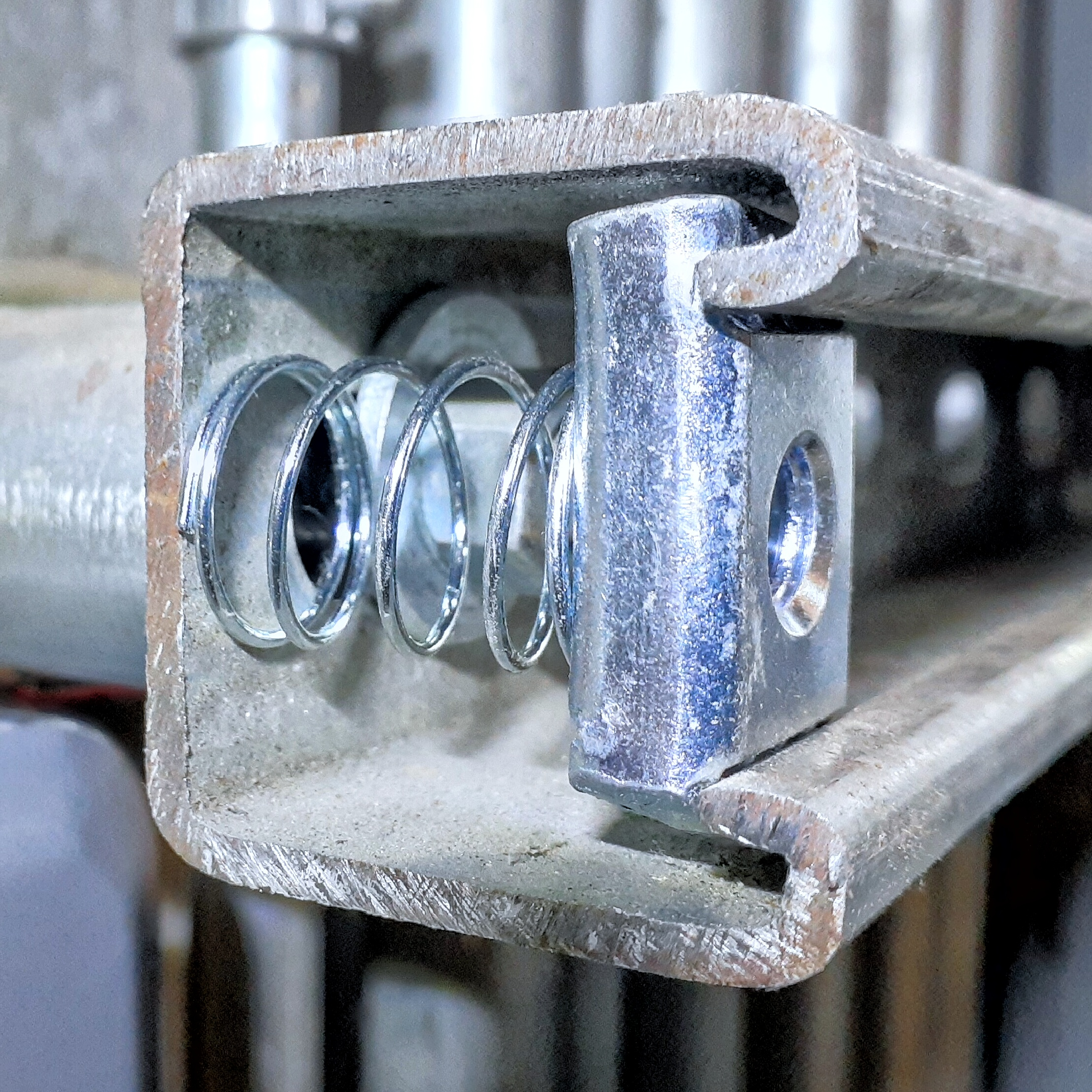
Spring-loaded nut placed inside the channel allows connections with bolts.

Strut channel is used to mount, brace, support, and connect lightweight structural loads in building construction. These include pipes, electrical and data wire, mechanical systems such as ventilation, air conditioning, and other mechanical systems. Objects can be attached to the strut channel with a bolt, threaded into a channel nut, that may have a spring to ease installation. Circular objects such as pipes or cables may be attached with straps that have a shaped end to be retained by the channel. Strut channel is also used for other applications that require a strong framework, such as workbenches, shelving systems, equipment racks, etc. Specially made sockets are available to tighten nuts, bolts, etc. inside the channel, as normal sockets are unable to fit through the opening.

Strut channel systems are used to create modular support frameworks in construction and industrial installations. Depending on load requirements and environmental conditions, different channel configurations and materials can be selected to support pipes, conduits, cable trays, equipment, and other components. These systems use channel nuts, bolts, brackets, and other fittings, allowing components to be repositioned or additional supports to be installed without extensive structural modifications.
