= Legal channeling =

Legal channeling is the act of legally making one entity responsible for an event, and thereby dismissing other parties from liability for an event.

For example; the third part liability for nuclear power plants is often channelled to the operator of the nuclear power plant. Therefore, contractors, who work at a nuclear power plant, do not have to have insurance in case one of their employees causes an accident with third party damages as a consequence.

== See also ==
- Strict liability
- Joint and several liability
- Vicarious liability
